= Let's Dance 2006 =

- Season 2006
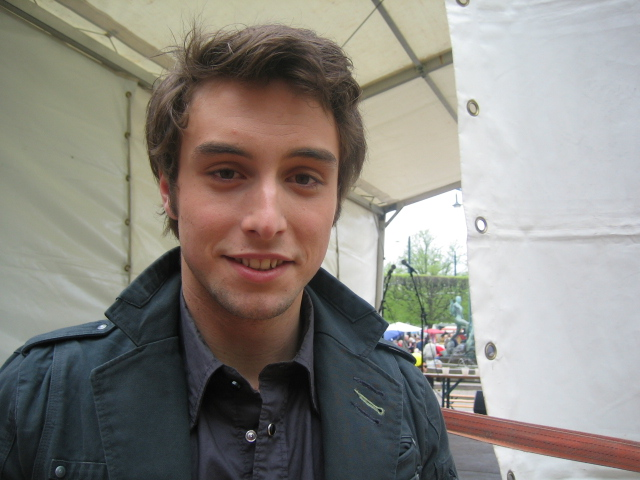
- Celebrity winner of the season, Måns Zelmerlöw
- Celebrity winner: Måns Zelmerlöw
- Professional winner: Maria Karlsson
- No. of episodes: 10

Release
- Original network: TV4
- Original release: 6 January – 10 March 2006

Season chronology
- Next → Let's Dance 2007

Let's Dance 2006 was the first season of the Swedish celebrity dancing show Let's Dance, broadcast on TV4. The show was presented by David Hellenius and Agneta Sjödin. Winner of this season was singer Måns Zelmerlöw and 1-runner up was singer Anna Book.

== Couples ==
Celebrity	Occupation	Professional partner	Status
Melker Andersson	Celebrity Chef	Ingrid Beate Thomsen	Eliminated 1st on 13 January 2006
Carolina Gynning	Big Brother 2004 Winner & TV Host	Daniel da Silva	Eliminated 2nd on 20 January 2006
Paolo Roberto	Boxer	Helena Fransson	Eliminated 3rd on 27 January 2006
Tone Bekkestad	TV4 Weather Presenter	Peter Broström	Eliminated 4th on 3 February 2006
Kishti Tomita	Idol Judge	Tobias Wallin	Eliminated 5th on 10 February 2006
Peppe Eng	Sports Journalist & TV Host	Malin Watson	Eliminated 6th on 17 February 2006
Arja Saijonmaa	Singer	Tobias Karlsson	Eliminated 7th on 24 February 2006
Viktor Åkerblom Nilsson	Actor & TV Host	Carin da Silva	Third Place on 3 March 2006
Anna Book	Singer	David Watson	Second Place on 10 March 2006
Måns Zelmerlöw	Singer & Idol 2005 Contestant	Maria Karlsson	Winners on 10 March 2006

== Scoring chart ==
Couple	Place	1	2	1+2	3	4	5	6	7	8	9	10
Måns & Maria	1	14				25	34	35	31	35	26+40=66	35+39+38=112
Anna & David	2	22	27	49		36	32	34	33	28	33+33=66	32+40+32=104
Viktor & Carin	3	16				25	26	31	35	29	31+34=65	
Arja & Tobias K.	4	19				29	30	32	38	32		
Peppe & Malin	5	15				18	15	14	18			
Kishti & Tobias W.	6	18				25	29	28				
Tone & Peter	7	24				23	23					
Paolo & Helena	8	19				22						
Carolina & Daniel	9	12	20	32								
Melker & Ingrid Beate	10	23										

Red numbers couple thats got the lowest score from the jury of the week.
Green numbers couple that got the highest score from the jury of the week.
the couple that was eliminated from the competition.
the couple that received the lowest score of the week and was eliminated.
the couple that got the lowest jury scory and televoting score.
winning couple.
second placing couple.

== Highest and lowest scoring performances ==
The best and worst performances in each dance according to the judges' marks are as follows:

Dance	Best dancer(s)	Best score	Worst dancer(s)	Worst score
Cha Cha Cha	Måns Zelmerlöw	35	Carolina Gynning	12
Waltz	Arja Saijonmaa	32	Måns Zelmerlöw; Peppe Eng	14
Rumba				
Quickstep				
Jive				
Tango				
Paso Doble	Anna Book	40	Paolo Roberto	22
Slowfox	Måns Zelmerlöw	40	Peppe Eng	18
Samba	Måns Zelmerlöw	34	Peppe Eng	15
Show Dance	Måns Zelmerlöw	38	Anna Book	32

=== Dance schedule ===
The celebrities and professional partners danced one of these routines for each corresponding week.

- Week 1: Cha-cha-cha or Waltz
- Week 2: Rumba or Quickstep
- Week 3: Jive or Tango
- Week 4: Paso Doble or Foxtrot
- Week 5: Samba
- Week 6: Cha-cha-cha or Waltz
- Week 7: Rumba or Quickstep
- Week 8: Jive or Tango
- Week 9: Paso Doble, Rumba, Cha-cha-cha, Quickstep or Foxtrot
- Week 10: Finals – Tango, Paso Doble or Samba and Show Dance

== Songs ==
=== Week 1 ===
Individual judges scores in the chart below (given in parentheses) are listed in this order from left to right: Maria, Dermot, Ann, Tony.

Running order

Couple	Score	Dance	Music
Arja & Tobias	19 (, , , , )	Cha-cha-cha	"What You Waiting For?"-Gwen Stefani
Måns & Maria	14 (, , , , )	Waltz	
Carolina & Daniel	12 (, , , , )	Cha-cha-cha	"Hung Up"-Madonna"
Kishti & Tobias	18 (, , , , )	Waltz	
Melker & Ingrid Beate	23 (, , , , )	Cha-cha-cha	"Tripping"—Robbie Williams
Tone & Peter	24 (, , , , )	Waltz	"Come Away with Me"—Norah Jones
Viktor & Carin	16 (, , , , )	Cha-cha-cha	
Anna & David	22 (, , , , )	Waltz	
Peppe & Malin	15 (, , , , )	Cha-cha-cha	"Push the Button"-Sugababes
Paolo & Helena	19 (, , , , )	Waltz	

=== Week 2 ===
Individual judges scores in the chart below (given in parentheses) are listed in this order from left to right: Maria, Dermot, Ann, Tony.

Running order

Couple	Score	Dance	Music	Result
Carolina & Daniel		Quickstep	"Pon de Replay"—Rihanna	
Tone & Peter		Rumba	"Live Tomorrow"—Laleh	
Viktor & Carin		Quickstep	"Let's Go Crazy"—Prince	
Paolo & Helena		Rumba	"Fan fan fan"—Thåström	
Melker & Ingrid Beate		Quickstep	"Sing, Sing, Sing"—Stand	Eliminated
Anna & David		Rumba	"(Where Do I Begin?) Love Story"—Shirley Bassey	
Peppe & Malin		Quickstep	"Jo-Anna Says"—Per Gessle	
Måns & Maria		Rumba	"Gone"—BWO	
Arja & Tobias		Quickstep	"Sparkling Diamonds"—Nicole Kidman	
Kishti & Tobias		Rumba	"Who's That Girl"—Darin	

=== Week 3 ===
Individual judges scores in the chart below (given in parentheses) are listed in this order from left to right: Maria, Dermot, Ann, Tony.

Running order

Couple	Score	Dance	Music	Result
Kishti & Tobias		Tango	"Hernando's Hideaway"—Alma Cogan	
Peppe & Malin		Jive	"Waterloo"-ABBA	
Tone & Peter		Tango	"I've Seen That Face Before (Libertango)"—Grace Jones	
Arja & Tobias		Jive	"Fever"—Madonna	
Måns & Maria		Tango	"Toxic"-Britney Spears	
Carolina & Daniel		Jive	"Such a Night"-Elvis Presley	Eliminated
Paolo & Helena		Tango		
Viktor & Carin		Jive		
Anna & David		Tango	"Whatever Lola Wants"-Sarah Vaughan	

=== Week 4 ===
Individual judges scores in the chart below (given in parentheses) are listed in this order from left to right: Maria, Dermot, Ann, Tony.

Running order

Couple	Score	Dance	Music	Result
Måns & Maria	25 (, , , , )	Paso Doble	"Don't Let Me Be Misunderstood"—The Animals	
Arja & Tobias	29 (, , , , )	Foxtrot	"Big Spender"—Shirley Bassey	
Paolo & Helena	22 (, , , , )	Paso Doble	"Y Viva España"—Sylvia Vrethammar	Eliminated
Viktor & Carin	25 (, , , , )	Foxtrot	"Bad Day"—Daniel Powter	
Anna & David	36 (, , , , )	Paso Doble	"Gypsy Dance"—Traditional	
Kishti & Tobias	25 (, , , , )	Paso Doble	"You Keep Me Hangin' On"—The Supremes	
Peppe & Malin	18 (, , , , )	Foxtrot	"Sunshine in the Rain"—BWO	
Tone & Peter	23 (, , , , )	Paso Doble	"Don't Cry for Me Argentina (Miami Mix)"-Madonna	

=== Week 5 ===
Individual judges scores in the chart below (given in parentheses) are listed in this order from left to right: Maria, Dermot, Ann, Tony.

Running order

Couple	Score	Dance	Music	Result
Viktor & Carin		Samba	"Crazy in Love"—Beyoncé	
Kishti & Tobias		Samba	"Step Up"—Darin	
Peppe & Malin		Samba	"Wanna Be Startin' Somethin'"—Michael Jackson	
Tone & Peter		Samba	"La Isla Bonita"—Madonna	Eliminated
Måns & Maria		Samba	"Alla vill till himmelen men ingen vill dö"—Timbuktu	
Anna & David		Samba	"La Tortura"—Shakira	
Arja & Tobias		Samba	"Dancing Queen"—ABBA	

=== Week 6 ===
Individual judges scores in the chart below (given in parentheses) are listed in this order from left to right: Maria, Dermot, Ann, Tony.

Running order

Couple	Score	Dance	Music	Result
Kishti & Tobias	28 (, , , , )	Cha-cha-cha	"Can't Get You Out of My Head"—Kylie Minogue	Eliminated
Arja & Tobias	32 (, , , , )	Waltz	"Three Times a Lady"—The Commodores	
Anna & David	34 (, , , , )	Cha-cha-cha	"Like I Love You"—Justin Timberlake	
Viktor & Carin	31 (, , , , )	Waltz	"Fix You"—Coldplay	
Måns & Maria	35 (, , , , )	Cha-cha-cha	"Sway"—Michael Bublé	
Peppe & Malin	14 (, , , , )	Waltz	"When I Need You"—Leo Sayer	

=== Week 7 ===
Individual judges scores in the chart below (given in parentheses) are listed in this order from left to right: Maria, Dermot, Ann, Tony.

Running order

Couple	Score	Dance	Music	Result
Peppe & Malin		Rumba	"Tycker om när du tar på mig"—Per Gessle	Eliminated
Anna & David		Quickstep	"I'm So Excited"—The Pointer Sisters	
Viktor & Carin		Rumba	"Never Be Afraid Again"—Christian Walz	
Måns & Maria		Quickstep	"You're the One That I Want"—John Travolta & Olivia Newton-John	
Arja & Tobias		Rumba	"Angels"—Robbie Williams	

=== Week 8 ===
Individual judges scores in the chart below (given in parentheses) are listed in this order from left to right: Maria, Dermot, Ann, Tony.

Running order

Couple	Score	Dance	Music	Result
Måns & Maria		Jive	"Wake Me Up Before You Go-Go"—Wham!	
Viktor & Carin		Tango	"Jealousy"—	
Anna & David		Jive	"Song with a Mission"—The Sounds	
Arja & Tobias		Tango	"Objection (Tango)"—Shakira	Eliminated

=== Week 9 ===
Running order

Couple	Score	Dance	Music	Result
Viktor & Carin	31 (7, 8, 7, 9)	Paso Doble	"Let Your Body Decide"—The Ark	Eliminated
Viktor & Carin	34 (8, 9, 9, 8)	Quickstep	"Be Mine!"—Robyn	Eliminated
Anna & David	33 (8, 9, 9, 7)	Rumba	"Forever Young"—Alphaville	
Anna & David	33 (7, 9, 10, 7)	Foxtrot	"The Lady Is a Tramp"—Frank Sinatra	
Måns & Maria	26 (9, 7, 7, 3)	Cha-Cha-Cha	"Sorry"—Madonna	
Måns & Maria	40 (10, 10, 10, 10)	Foxtrot	"Sixteen Tons"—Tom Jones	

=== Week 10 ===
Running order

Couple	Score	Dance	Music	Result
Anna & David		Tango	"Whatever Lola Wants"—Sarah Vaughan	Runners-up
Anna & David	40 (10, 10, 10, 10)	Paso Doble	"Gypsy Dance"—Traditional	Runners-up
Anna & David		Showdance	"Diamonds Are Forever"—Shirley Bassey	Runners-up
Måns & Maria		Tango	"Toxic"—Britney Spears	Winners
Måns & Maria		Samba	"Alla vill till himmelen men ingen vill dö"—Timbuktu	Winners
Måns & Maria		Showdance	"Live and Let Die"—Paul McCartney and Wings	Winners
