= Let's Dance (Swedish TV series) =

Swedish dance competition

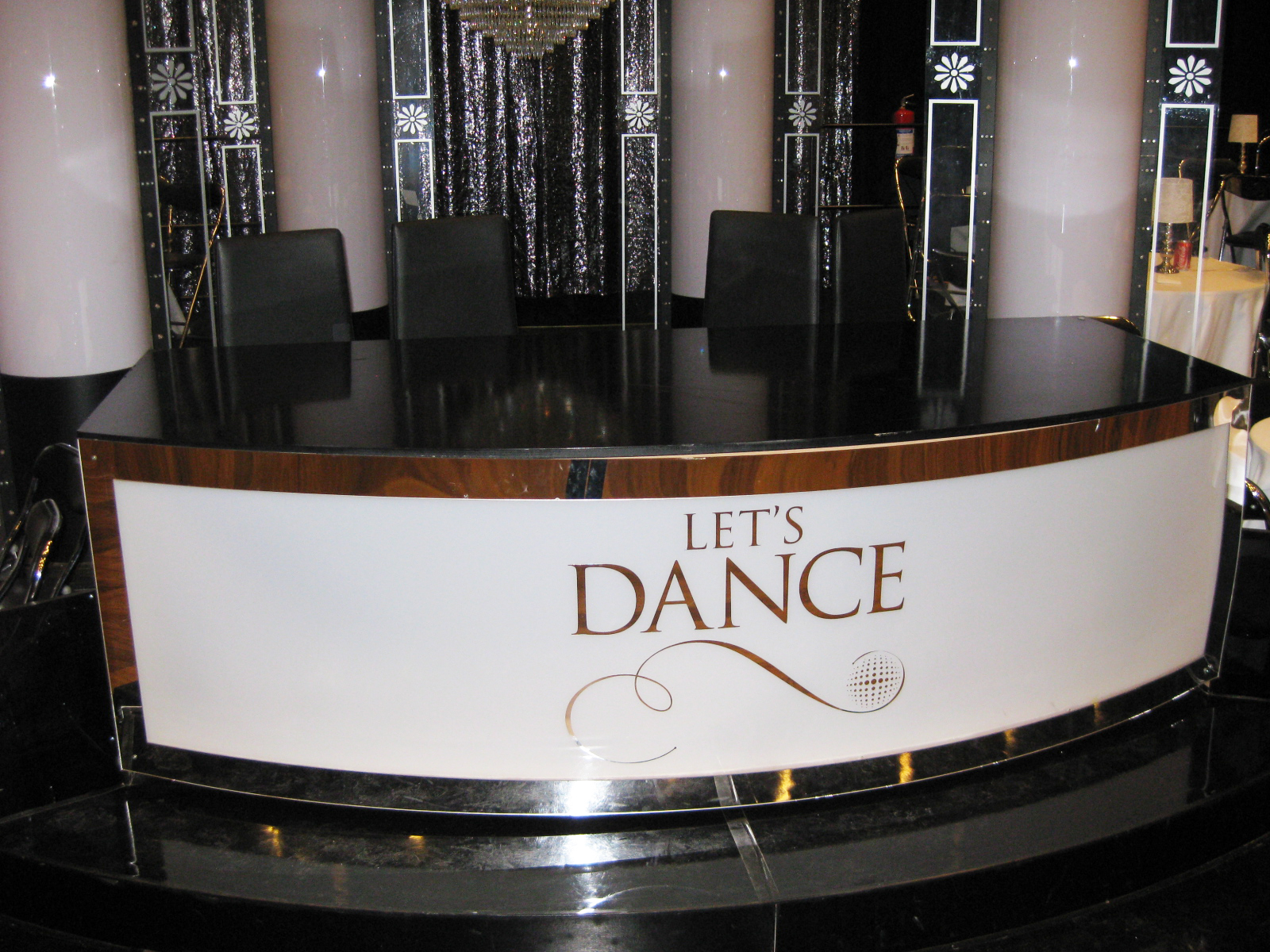
- Genre: dance contest
- Presented by: Johanna Nordström; Pär Lernström; Kristin Kaspersen; Petra Mede; David Lindgren; David Hellenius; Tilde de Paula Eby; Jessica Almenäs; Agneta Sjödin
- Judges: Tony Irving; Taya Shawki; Eric Saade
- Opening theme: "Let's Dance" by David Bowie; Let's Dance by Linda Sundblad
- Country of origin: Sweden
- Original language: Swedish
- No. of seasons: 19 (2025)

Original release
- Network: TV4
- Release: 6 January 2006 – 10 May 2025

Let's Dance is a Swedish dance competition featuring Swedish celebrities. It is the Swedish version of the British reality TV competition Strictly Come Dancing and is part of the Dancing with the Stars franchise. The series has been broadcast for eighteen seasons on TV4. A jury of three to four people, combined with viewer voting, decides which dance couples will remain in the competition and which will be eliminated each week. The program was initially broadcast in January–March each year but changed in season seven (2012) to broadcast between February/March and May/June on fridays but since season sixteen (2021) to broadcast on Saturdays.

On 30 August 2023, TV4 announced that the show will be paused during 2024, the first pause in the show's history. The new season premiered on 15 March 2025

== Presenters ==
The show has had a number of different presenters across its seasons.

Key
Presenter of Let's Dance

Presenter	Series																	
Presenter	1	2	3	4	5	6	7	8	9	10	11	12	13	14	15	16	17	18
David Hellenius	Main	Main	Main	Main	Main	Main	Main	Main	Main	Main	Main	Main	Main	Main	Main			
Agneta Sjödin	Main	Main																
Jessica Almenäs			Main	Main	Main	Main	Main	Main	Main	Main	Main							
Tilde de Paula												Main	Main	Main	Main			
Petra Mede																Main	Main	
David Lindgren																Main	Main	Main
Kristin Kaspersen																		Main

== Judging panel ==
Key
Judge of Let's Dance

Judge	Series																		
Judge	1	2	3	4	5	6	7	8	9	10	11	12	13	14	15	16	17	18	19
Tony Irving	Main	Main	Main	Main	Main	Main	Main	Main	Main	Main	Main	Main	Main	Main	Main	Main	Main	Main	Main
Ann Wilson	Main	Main	Main	Main	Main	Main	Main	Main	Main	Main	Main	Main	Main	Main	Main	Main	Main	Main	
Dermot Clemenger	Main	Main	Main	Main	Main	Main	Main	Main	Main	Main					Main	Main	Main	Main	
Maria Öhrman	Main	Main	Main	Main	Main														
Isabel Edvardsson						Main													
Cecilia Lazar											Main	Main	Main	Main					
Taya Shawki																		Main	Main
Eric Saade																		Main	Main

== Main series results ==
Series	Premiere date	Finale date	Number of couples	Number of weeks			
Series	Premiere date	Finale date	Number of couples	Number of weeks	Winners	Second place	Third place
1	6 January 2006	10 March 2006	10	10	Måns Zelmerlöw & Maria Karlsson	Anna Book & David Watson	Viktor Åkerblom Nilsson & Carin da Silva
2	12 January 2007	30 March 2007	12	12	Martin Lidberg & Cecilia Ehrling	Tobias Blom & Annika Sjöö	Erica Johansson & Daniel da Silva
3	11 January 2008	28 March 2008	12	12	Tina Nordström & Tobias Karlsson	Tony Rickardsson & Annika Sjöö	Karl Petter Bergvall & Jeanette Carlsson
4	9 January 2009	27 March 2009	12	12	Magnus Samuelsson & Annika Sjöö	Laila Bagge & Tobias Wallin	Morgan Alling & Helena Fransson
5	8 January 2010	26 March 2010	12	12	Mattias Andréasson & Cecilia Ehrling	Claudia Galli & Tobias Wallin	Willy Björkman & Charlotte Sinclair
6	7 January 2011	25 March 2011	12	12	Jessica Andersson & Kristjan Lootus	Frank Andersson & Charlotte Sinclair	Tina Thörner & Tobias Karlsson
7	30 March 2012	1 June 2012	10	10	Anton Hysén & Sigrid Bernson	Molly Nutley & Calle Sterner	Marcus Schenkenberg & Maria Bild
8	29 March 2013	31 May 2013	10	10	Markoolio & Cecilia Ehrling	Oscar Zia & Maria Bild	Maria Montazami & Kristjan Lootus
9	28 February 2014	9 May 2014	11	11	Benjamin Wahlgren Ingrosso & Sigrid Bernson	Steffo Törnquist & Cecilia Ehrling	Gunhild Carling & Kristjan Lootus
10	27 February 2015	24 April 2015	9	9	Ingemar Stenmark & Cecilia Ehrling	Marie Serneholt & Kristjan Lootus	Jonas Björkman & Veera Kinnunen
11	11 March 2016	20 May 2016	11	11	Elisa Lindström & Yvo Eussen	Bianca Wahlgren Ingrosso & Alexander Svanberg	Thomas Wassberg & Malin Watson
12	10 March 2017	12 May 2017	10	9	Jesper Blomqvist & Malin Watson	Anja Pärson & Calle Sterner	Ellen Bergström & Jonathan Näslund
13	23 March 2018	1 June 2018	11	11	Jon Henrik Fjällgren & Katja Luján Engelholm	Daniel Norberg & Maria Zimmerman	Gunde Svan & Jeanette Carlsson
14	22 March 2019	31 May 2019	11	11	Kristin Kaspersen & Calle Sterner	Magdalena Forsberg & Fredric Brunberg	Lance Hedman Graaf & Linn Hegdal
15	20 March 2020	29 May 2020	10	8	John Lundvik & Linn Hegdal	Sussie Eriksson & Calle Sterner	Anders Svensson & Maria Zimmerman
16	20 March 2021	15 May 2021	9	9	Filip Lamprecht & Linn Hegdal	Anis Don Demina & Katja Luján Engelholm	Keyyo & Hugo Gustafsson
17	19 March 2022	21 May 2022	10	10	Eric Saade & Katja Lujan Engelholm	Filip Dikmen & Linn Hegdal	Marie Mandelmann & Jonathan Näslund
18	18 March 2023	27 May 2023	10	11	Hampus Hedström & Ines Maria Ștefănescu	Charlotte Kalla & Tobias Karlsson	Renaida Braun & Tobias Bader
19	15 March 2025	10 May 2025	15	9	Theoz & Paulina Rosenkvist	Perla Malmberg & Nik Alexander	Ferry Svan & Filippa Strand
20	21 August 2026	9 October 2026	10	11	Martinus Gunnarsen & Paulina Rosenkvist	Lovisa Karlsson & Axel Jehrlander	Lisa Borg & Nik Alexander / Ludwig Blomqvist & Ida Sund
