= Let's Dance 2013 =

- Season 2013
- Celebrity winner: Markoolio
- Professional winner: Cecilia Ehrling

Release
- Original network: TV4
- Original release: 29 March – 31 May 2013

Season chronology
- ← Previous; Let's Dance 2012 Next → Let's Dance 2014

Let's Dance 2013 was the eighth season of the Swedish celebrity dance series Let's Dance on TV4. It premiered on 29 March 2013.

== Couples ==
Celebrity	Occupation	Professional partner	Status
Jennifer Åkerman	Model, singer & blogger	Calle Sterner	Eliminated 1st on 5 April 2013
Robban Andersson	Reality television star	Oksana Spichak	Eliminated 2nd on 12 April 2013
Anette Norberg	Former Olympic curler	Tobias Karlsson	Eliminated 3rd on 19 April 2013
Håkan Dahlby	Olympic double trap shooter	Jeanette Carlsson	Eliminated 4th on 26 April 2013
Sofia Wistam	Television & radio host	Tobias Bader	Eliminated 5th on 3 May 2013
Anna Brolin	Sports presenter	Tobias Wallin	Eliminated 6th on 10 May 2013
Erik Segerstedt	Singer & Idol 2006 contestant	Sigrid Bernson	Eliminated 7th on 17 May 2013
Maria Montazami	Reality television star	Kristjan Lootus	Third Place on 24 May 2013
Oscar Zia	Singer & X Factor contestant	Maria Bild	Second Place on 31 May 2013
Markoolio	Singer	Cecilia Ehrling	Winners on 31 May 2013

== Scoring chart ==
Couple	Place	1	2	1+2	3	4	5	6	7	8	9	10
Markoolio & Cecilia	1	16	20	36	27	19	25+4=29	28+12=40	27+2=29	22+18=40	21+30=51	26+30+30=86
Oscar & Maria	2	17	21	38	23	24	30+0=30	17+6=23	30+8=38	26+27=53	30+28=58	25+30+30=85
Maria & Kristjan	3	15	10	25	21	14	18+6=24	21+4=25	15+6=21	27+18=45	19+21=40	
Erik & Sigrid	4	18	18	36	17	21	20+0=20	26+8=34	16+4=20	21+27=48		
Anna & Tobias W.	5	15	22	37	24	20	20+2=22	22+10=32	21+10=31			
Sofia & Tobias B.	6	9	15	24	15	19	16+0=16	18+2=20				
Håkan & Jeanette	7	14	24	38	23	15	20+0=20					
Anette & Tobias K.	8	12	17	29	21	17						
Robban & Oksana	9	6	18	24	17							
Jennifer & Calle	10	16	12	28								

== Average chart ==
Rank by average	Place	Couple	Total	Number of dances	Average
1	2	Oscar & Maria	358	14	25.6
2	1	Markoolio & Cecilia	339	14	24.2
3	5	Anna & Tobias W.	144	7	20.6
4	4	Erik & Sigrid	184	9	20.4
5	7	Håkan & Jeanette	96	5	19.2
6	3	Maria & Kristjan	199	11	18.1
7	8	Anette & Tobias K.	67	4	16.8
8	6	Sofia & Tobias B.	94	6	15.7
9	10	Jennifer & Calle	28	2	14.0
10	9	Robban & Oksana	41	3	13.7

=== Average dance chart ===
Couples	Averages	Best Dance(s)	Worst Dance(s)
Markoolio & Cecilia	24.2	Samba, Waltz & Showdance (30)	Slowfox (16)
Oscar & Maria	25.6	Quickstep (x2), Slowfox, Waltz & Showdance (30)	Paso Doble, Jive (17)
Maria & Kristjan	18.1	Tango (27)	Jive (10)
Erik & Sigrid	20.4	Team Dance (27)	Slowfox (16)
Anna & Tobias W.	20.6	Slowfox (24)	Waltz (15)
Sofia & Tobias B.	15.3	Samba (19)	Cha-Cha-Cha (9)
Håkan & Jeanette	19.2	Rumba (24)	Slowfox (14)
Anette & Tobias K.	16.8	Rumba (21)	Paso Doble (17)
Robban & Oksana	13.7	Slowfox (18)	Cha-Cha-Cha (6)
Jennifer & Calle	12.0	Cha-Cha-Cha (16)	Slowfox (12)
