= Let's Dance 2015 =

- Season 2015
- Celebrity winner: Ingemar Stenmark
- Professional winner: Cecilia Ehrling
- No. of episodes: 9

Release
- Original network: TV4
- Original release: 27 February – 24 April 2015

Season chronology
- ← Previous; Let's Dance 2014 Next → Let's Dance 2016

Let's Dance 2015 is the tenth season of the Swedish celebrity dancing show Let's Dance, which was broadcast on TV4 and presented by David Hellenius and Jessica Almenäs.

== Couples ==
Celebrity	Occupation	Professional partner	Status
Rebecca Simonsson	Blogger	Alexander Svanberg	Eliminated 1st on 6 March 2015
Simon Sköld	MMA Champion	Maria Zimmerman	Eliminated 2nd on 13 March 2015
Nanne Grönvall	Singer-Songwriter	Tobias Wallin	Eliminated 3rd on 20 March 2015
Jonas Hallberg	Fashion stylist	Malin Watson	Eliminated 4th on 27 March 2015
Jenny Strömstedt	Television Host & Journalist	Stefano Oradei	Eliminated 5th on 3 April 2015
Alexander Hermansson	Entertainer	Jeanette Carlsson	Eliminated 6th on 10 April 2015
Jonas Björkman	Former Professional Tennis Player	Veera Kinnunen	Third Place on 17 April 2015
Marie Serneholt	Singer & Model	Kristjan Lootus	Second Place on 24 April 2015
Ingemar Stenmark	Former World Cup Alpine Ski Racer	Cecilia Ehrling	Winners on 24 April 2015

== Scoring chart ==
Couple	Place	1	2	1+2	3	4	5	6	7	8	9
Ingemar & Cecilia	1	17	17	34	15	20	19	21+4=25	17+21=38	24+22=46	27+28+28=83
Marie & Kristjan	2	18	20	38	24	27	30	26+12=38	27+27=54	30+28=58	30+30+30=90
Jonas B. & Veera	3	17	14	31	17	20	21	27+10=37	28+30=58	30+25=55	
Alexander & Jeanette	4	11	25	36	23	21	24	19+8=27	26+27=53		
Jenny & Stefano	5	15	12	27	18	15	14	20+6=26			
Jonas H. & Malin	6	8	14	22	8	8	12				
Nanne & Tobias	7	13	19	32	20	18					
Simon & Maria	8	11	18	29	14						
Rebecca & Alexander	9	8	16	24							

== Average chart ==
Rank by average	Place	Couple	Total	Number of dances	Average
1	2	Marie & Kristjan	347	13	26.7
2	3	Jonas B. & Veera	229	10	22.9
3	4	Alexander & Jeanette	176	8	22.0
4	1	Ingemar & Cecilia	276	13	21.2
5	7	Nanne & Tobias	70	4	17.5
6	5	Jenny & Stefano	93	6	15.5
7	8	Simon & Maria	43	3	14.3
8	9	Rebecca & Alexander	24	2	12.0
9	6	Jonas H. & Malin	50	5	10.0

=== Average dance chart ===
Couples	Averages	Best Dance(s)	Worst Dance(s)
Ingemar & Cecilia	21.2	Quickstep & Showdance (28)	Tango (15)
Marie & Kristjan	26.7	Tango (twice), Disco, Jive & Showdance (30)	Cha-Cha-Cha (18)
Jonas B. & Veera	22.9	Paso Doble & Hip-Hop (30)	Quickstep (14)
Alexander & Jeanette	22.0	Waltz (27)	Samba (11)
Jenny & Stefano	15.5	Quickstep (20)	Jive (12)
Jonas H. & Malin	10.0	Slowfox (12)	Cha-Cha-Cha, Rumba & Jive (8)
Nanne & Tobias	17.5	Rumba (20)	Cha-Cha-Cha (13)
Simon & Maria	14.3	Jive (18)	Slowfox (11)
Rebecca & Alexander	12.0	Quickstep (16)	Samba (8)

== Songs ==
=== Week 1 ===
Individual judges scores in charts below (given in parentheses) are listed in this order from left to right: Dermot Clemenger, Ann Wilson and Tony Irving.

Running order

Couple	Score	Style	Music
Marie & Kristjan	18 (6,6,6)	Cha-Cha-Cha	"Ugly Heart" – G.R.L.
Alexander & Jeanette	11 (4,4,3)	Samba	"Animals" – Maroon 5
Jenny & Stefano	15 (5,5,5)	Slowfox	"Unconditionally" – Katy Perry
Jonas B. & Veera	17 (6,6,5)	Samba	"Wherever I Go" – The Foundations
Nanne & Tobias	13 (4,5,4)	Cha-Cha-Cha	"You Shook Me All Night Long" – AC/DC
Simon & Maria	11 (4,4,3)	Slowfox	"A Sky Full of Stars" – Coldplay
Jonas H. & Malin	8 (3,3,2)	Cha-Cha-Cha	"All About That Bass" – Meghan Trainor
Rebecca & Alexander	8 (3,3,2)	Samba	"Boom Clap" – Charli XCX
Ingemar & Cecilia	17 (5,6,6)	Slowfox	"Alien" – Orup

=== Week 2 ===
Individual judges scores in charts below (given in parentheses) are listed in this order from left to right: Dermot Clemenger, Ann Wilson and Tony Irving.

Running order

Couple	Score	Style	Music
Jonas B. & Veera	14 (4,5,5)	Quickstep	"Ballroom Blitz" – Sweet
Jenny & Stefano	12 (5,4,3)	Jive	"Dry My Soul" – Amanda Jenssen
Jonas H. & Malin	14 (4,5,5)	Slowfox	"All of Me" – John Legend
Alexander & Jeanette	25 (8,8,9)	Quickstep	"Wrapped Up" – Olly Murs feat. Travie McCoy
Ingemar & Cecilia	17 (6,6,5)	Jive	"Waterloo" – ABBA
Marie & Kristjan	20 (7,7,6)	Slowfox	"Survivor" – Helena Paparizou
Simon & Maria	18 (7,6,5)	Jive	"Shake It Off" – Taylor Swift
Nanne & Tobias	19 (6,6,7)	Slowfox	"I've Got the World on a String" – Michael Bublé
Rebecca & Alexander	16 (6,5,5)	Quickstep	"Suddenly I See" – KT Tunstall

=== Week 3 ===
Individual judges scores in charts below (given in parentheses) are listed in this order from left to right: Dermot Clemenger, Ann Wilson and Tony Irving.

Running order

Couple	Score	Style	Music
Simon & Maria	14 (4,5,5)	Tango	"The Nights" – Avicii
Jonas B. & Veera	17 (6,6,5)	Jive	"Tell Her About It" – Billy Joel
Marie & Kristjan	24 (8,8,8)	Rumba	"Girl on Fire" – Alicia Keys
Alexander & Jeanette	23 (8,8,7)	Jive	"Girlfriend" – Avril Lavigne
Nanne & Tobias	20 (7,7,6)	Rumba	"Tusen bitar" – Björn Afzelius
Ingemar & Cecilia	15 (4,6,5)	Tango	"Geronimo" – Sheppard
Jonas H. & Malin	8 (3,3,2)	Rumba	"Thinking Out Loud" – Ed Sheeran
Jenny & Stefano	18 (6,6,6)	Tango	"Hela huset" – Veronica Maggio feat. Håkan Hellström

=== Week 4 ===
Individual judges scores in charts below (given in parentheses) are listed in this order from left to right: Dermot Clemenger, Ann Wilson and Tony Irving.

Running order

Couple	Score	Style	Music
Nanne & Tobias	18 (7,6,5)	Jive	"Crazy Little Thing Called Love" – Queen
Alexander & Jeanette	21 (7,7,7)	Cha-Cha-Cha	"To the End" – Yohio
Marie & Kristjan	27 (9,9,9)	Jive	"Can't Buy Me Love" – The Beatles
Ingemar & Cecilia	20 (7,7,6)	Samba	"Diamonds Are a Girl's Best Friend" – Marilyn Monroe
Jonas H. & Malin	8 (3,3,2)	Jive	"Heartbeat Song" – Kelly Clarkson
Jenny & Stefano	15 (6,5,4)	Samba	"When We Dig for Gold in the USA" – GES
Jonas B. & Veera	20 (7,7,6)	Cha-Cha-Cha	"Waka Waka (This Time for Africa)" – Shakira

=== Week 5 ===
Individual judges scores in charts below (given in parentheses) are listed in this order from left to right: Dermot Clemenger, Ann Wilson and Tony Irving.

Running order

Couple	Score	Style	Music
Ingemar & Cecilia	19 (6,6,7)	Cha-Cha-Cha	"Ain't No Mountain High Enough" – Marvin Gaye & Tammi Terrell
Jonas B. & Veera	21 (7,7,7)	Slowfox	"Heroes" – Måns Zelmerlöw
Jonas H. & Malin	12 (4,5,3)	Tango	"Yes Sir, I Can Boogie" – Baccara
Jenny & Stefano	14 (5,5,4)	Cha-Cha-Cha	"Kärleken är evig" – Lena Philipsson
Marie & Kristjan	30 (10,10,10)	Tango	"I Promised Myself" – A*Teens
Alexander & Jeanette	24 (8,8,8)	Slowfox	"Forever Starts Today" – Linus Svenning

=== Week 6 ===
Individual judges scores in charts below (given in parentheses) are listed in this order from left to right: Dermot Clemenger, Ann Wilson and Tony Irving.

Running order

Couple	Score	Style	Music
Alexander & Jeanette	19 (6,7,6)	Rumba	"En värld full av liv" – from Lejonkungen
Jenny & Stefano	20 (7,6,7)	Quickstep	"Show Me How You Burlesque" – from Burlesque
Marie & Kristjan	26 (9,9,8)	Samba	"Place for Us" – from The Hunger Games: Catching Fire
Ingemar & Cecilia	21 (7,7,7)	Quickstep	"You're The One That I Want" – from Grease
Jonas & Veera	27 (9,9,9)	Rumba	"Love Me like You Do" – from Fifty Shades of Grey
Ingemar & Cecilia; Jenny & Stefano; Alexander & Jeanette; Jonas & Veera; Marie & Kristjan	4; 6; 8; 10; 12	Swing	"Danger Zone" – from Top Gun
Ingemar & Cecilia; Jenny & Stefano; Alexander & Jeanette; Jonas & Veera; Marie & Kristjan	4; 6; 8; 10; 12	Swing	"Great Balls of Fire" – from Top Gun
Ingemar & Cecilia; Jenny & Stefano; Alexander & Jeanette; Jonas & Veera; Marie & Kristjan	4; 6; 8; 10; 12	Swing	"Footloose" – from Footloose
Ingemar & Cecilia; Jenny & Stefano; Alexander & Jeanette; Jonas & Veera; Marie & Kristjan	4; 6; 8; 10; 12	Swing	"Miserlou" – from Pulp Fiction
Ingemar & Cecilia; Jenny & Stefano; Alexander & Jeanette; Jonas & Veera; Marie & Kristjan	4; 6; 8; 10; 12	Swing	"Yes" – from Dirty Dancing

=== Week 7 ===
Individual judges scores in charts below (given in parentheses) are listed in this order from left to right: Dermot Clemenger, Ann Wilson and Tony Irving.

Running order

Couple	Score	Style	Music
Ingemar & Cecilia	17 (6,6,5)	Rumba	"Sting" – Eric Saade
Ingemar & Cecilia	21 (7,7,7)	Waltz	"Come Away with Me" – Norah Jones
Alexander & Jeanette	26 (9,9,8)	Tango	"Frank" – Albin feat. DMA
Alexander & Jeanette	27 (9,9,9)	Waltz	"You Make Me Feel Like a Natural Woman" – Aretha Franklin
Marie & Kristjan	27 (9,8,10)	Quickstep	"Weathering" – Magnus Uggla
Marie & Kristjan	27 (9,9,9)	Paso Doble	"Paper Light (Higher)" – Loreen
Jonas & Veera	28 (10,9,9)	Tango	"Hos dig är jag underbar" – Patrik Isaksson
Jonas & Veera	30 (10,10,10)	Paso Doble	"I Love It" – Icona Pop feat. Charli XCX

=== Week 8 ===
Individual judges scores in charts below (given in parentheses) are listed in this order from left to right: Dermot Clemenger, Ann Wilson and Tony Irving.

Running order

Couple	Score	Style	Music
Marie & Kristjan	30 (10,10,10)	Disco	"YMCA" – The Village People
Marie & Kristjan	28 (10,8,10)	Slowfox	"Survivor" – Helena Paparizou
Ingemar & Cecilia	24 (8,8,8)	Broadway	"Cabaret" – from Cabaret
Ingemar & Cecilia	22 (8,7,7)	Tango	"Geronimo" – Sheppard
Jonas & Veera	30 (10,10,10)	Hip-Hop	"Survivor" – Destiny's Child
Jonas & Veera	25 (8,8,9)	Quickstep	"Ballroom Blitz" – Sweet

=== Week 9 ===
Individual judges scores in charts below (given in parentheses) are listed in this order from left to right: Dermot Clemenger, Ann Wilson and Tony Irving.

Running order

Couple	Score	Style	Music
Marie & Kristjan	30 (10,10,10)	Jive	"Can't Buy Me Love" – The Beatles
Marie & Kristjan	30 (10,10,10)	Tango	"I Promised Myself" – A*Teens
Marie & Kristjan	30 (10,10,10)	Showdance	"Livin' la Vida Loca" – Ricky Martin
Ingemar & Cecilia	27 (9,9,9)	Samba	"Diamonds Are a Girl's Best Friend" – Marilyn Monroe
Ingemar & Cecilia	28 (9,10,9)	Quickstep	"You're The One That I Want" – from Grease
Ingemar & Cecilia	28 (9,9,10)	Showdance	"James Bond Medley"

== Dance chart ==
Couple	1	2	3	4	5	6		7		8		9		
Ingemar & Cecilia	Foxtrot	Jive	Tango	Samba	Cha-Cha-Cha	Quickstep	Swing	Rumba	Waltz	Broadway	Tango	Samba	Quickstep	Showdance
Marie & Kristjan	Cha-Cha-Cha	Foxtrot	Rumba	Jive	Tango	Samba	Swing	Quickstep	Paso Doble	Disco	Foxtrot	Jive	Tango	Showdance
Jonas B. & Veera	Samba	Quickstep	Jive	Cha-Cha-Cha	Foxtrot	Rumba	Swing	Tango	Paso Doble	Hip-Hop	Quickstep			
Alexander & Jeanette	Samba	Quickstep	Jive	Cha-Cha-Cha	Foxtrot	Rumba	Swing	Tango	Waltz					
Jenny & Stefano	Foxtrot	Jive	Tango	Samba	Cha-Cha-Cha	Quickstep	Swing							
Jonas H. & Malin	Cha-Cha-Cha	Foxtrot	Rumba	Jive	Tango									
Nanne & Tobias	Cha-Cha-Cha	Foxtrot	Rumba	Jive										
Simon & Maria	Foxtrot	Jive	Tango											
Rebecca & Alexander	Samba	Quickstep												

Highest Scoring Dance
Lowest Scoring Dance
