= Let's Dance 2017 =

Season of television series

- Season 2017
- Celebrity winner: Jesper Blomqvist
- Professional winner: Malin Watson
- No. of episodes: 9

Release
- Original network: TV4
- Original release: March 10 – May 12, 2017

Season chronology
- ← Previous; Let's Dance 2016 Next → Let's Dance 2018

Let's Dance 2017 is the twelfth season of the celebrity dance show Let's Dance in Sweden. The presenters were David Hellenius and new for this season was presenter Tilde de Paula Eby who replaced Jessica Almenäs. It premiered on 10 March 2017 on TV4.

== Cancelled episode ==
On 7 April the fifth episode of the series was cancelled after the attack in Stockholm that happened earlier in the day. The dances planned for the episode were performed on the 13 April episode, and the season continued as planned, but with two couples being eliminated in the upcoming episodes on 13 and 14 April. The double episodes in week 5 were pre-planned, but originally, only one couple would have been eliminated in the Friday episode, with the combined score from Thursdays episode being counted to the final result.

== Couples ==
Celebrity	Occupation	Professional partner	Status
Mikaela Laurén	Professional boxer	Kristjan Lootus	Eliminated 1st on 17 March 2017
Messiah Hallberg	Stand-up comedian	Nathalie Davidsson	Eliminated 2nd on 24 March 2017
Dominika Peczynski	Singer & model	Martin Drakenberg	Eliminated 3rd on 31 March 2017
Johannes Brost	Actor	Jasmine Takacs	Eliminated 4th on 13 April 2017
Samir Badran	Singer & television personality	Sigrid Bernson	Eliminated 5th on 14 April 2017
Anders Öfvergård	Carpenter & entrepreneur	Cecilia Ehrling	Eliminated 6th on 21 April 2017
Stina Wollter	Artist & radio host	Tobias Bader	Eliminated 7th on 28 April 2017
Ellen Bergström	Actress	Jonathan Näslund	Third place on 5 May 2017
Anja Pärson	Former Olympic alpine skier	Calle Sterner	Second place on 12 May 2017
Jesper Blomqvist	Former football player	Malin Watson	Winners on 12 May 2017

== Scoring chart ==
Couple	Place	1	2	1+2	3	4	5	6	7	8	9
Jesper & Malin	1	14	17	31	15	19	24	21+12=33	23+4=27	26+30=56	29+28=57
Anja & Calle	2	16	16	32	18	23	20	25+6=31	29+10=39	27+26=53	29+26=55
Ellen & Jonathan	3	14	13	27	14	21	28	25+8=33	27+6=33	30+27=57	29+27=56
Stina & Tobias	4	21	19	40	17	15	16	20+2=22	24+2=26	22+26=48	
Anders & Cecilia	5	11	16	27	20	20	24	24+10=34	21+8=29		
Samir & Sigrid	6	17	10	27	18	15	24	26+4=30			
Johannes & Jasmine	7	7	9	16	12	11	18				
Dominika & Martin	8	13	17	30	14	14					
Messiah & Nathalie	9	7	8	15	11						
Mikaela & Kristjan	10	9	14	23							

Red numbers indicate the lowest score for each week.
Green numbers indicate the highest score for each week.
indicates the couple (or couples) eliminated that week.
indicates the returning couple that finished in the bottom two (or bottom three).
indicates the winning couple.
indicates the third place couple.
indicates the runner-up couple.

Rank by average	Place	Couple	Total points	Number of dances	Total average
1	2	Anja & Calle	255	11	23.2
1	3	Ellen & Jonathan	255	11	23.2
3	1	Jesper & Malin	246	11	22.4
4	4	Stina & Tobias	180	9	20.0
5	5	Anders & Cecilia	136	7	19.4
6	6	Samir & Sigrid	110	6	18.3
7	8	Dominika & Martin	58	4	14.5
8	10	Mikaela & Kristjan	23	2	11.5
9	7	Johannes & Jasmine	57	5	11.4
10	9	Messiah & Nathalie	26	3	8.7
