= Let's Dance 2023 =

- Season 2023
- Celebrity winner: Hampus Hedström
- Professional winner: Ines Maria Ștefănescu

Release
- Original network: TV4
- Original release: 18 March – 27 May 2023

Season chronology
- ← Previous; Let's Dance 2022 Next → Let's Dance 2025

Let's Dance 2023 was the eighteenth season of the Swedish television celebrity dance competition series Let's Dance. It premiered on 18 March 2023 on TV4. David Lindgren returned as presenter.

On 11 March 2023, Petra Mede announced that she had quit as a presenter for the show, citing problems with her back as the main issue. She was replaced by Kristin Kaspersen, the 2019 champion of the competition.

== Contestants ==
This year saw the first female dance pair of Nilla Fischer and Cecilia Ehrling.

Celebrity	Occupation	Professional partner	Status
Nilla Fischer	Former Sweden footballer	Cecilia Ehrling	Eliminated 1st on 25 March 2023
Johan Jureskog	Chef	Hedvig Löfwall	Eliminated 2nd on 1 April 2023
Kodjo Akolor	Comedian, television & radio presenter	Jasmin Takács	Eliminated 3rd on 8 April 2023
Andreas Wijk	Singer	Ida Sund	Eliminated 4th on 15 April 2023
Tone Sekelius	Influencer & singer	Hugo Gustafsson; Tobias Bader (Week 6)	Eliminated 5th on 29 April 2023
Johanna Lind	Model & Miss Sweden 1993	Tobias Wallin; Tobias Karlsson (Week 6)	Eliminated 6th on 6 May 2023
Rickard Sjöberg	Journalist & television presenter	Tove Villför; Ines Maria Ștefănescu (Week 6)	Eliminated 7th on 13 May 2023
Renaida Braun	Singer & actress	Tobias Bader; Hugo Gustafsson (Week 6)	Third Place on 20 May 2023
Charlotte Kalla	Former olympic cross-country skier	Tobias Karlsson; Tobias Wallin (Week 6)	Runner-up on 27 May 2023
Hampus Hedström	YouTube personality & comedian	Ines Maria Ștefănescu; Tove Villför (Week 6)	Winner on 27 May 2023

== Scoring chart ==
Couple	Place	1	2	1+2	3	4	5	6	7	6+7	8	9	10	11
Hampus & Ines	1	10	16	26	16	24	27	30+0=30	27+8=35	65	24+10=34	30+10=40	30+30=60	30+30+30=90
Charlotte & Tobias K.	2	9	10	19	15	14	21	24+0=24	28+10=38	62	22+12=34	21+0=21	25+29=54	30+27+27=84
Renaida & Tobias B.	3	13	17	30	17	16	24	18+0=18	28+12=40	58	26+4=30	27+0=27	28+30=58	
Rickard & Tove	4	14	12	26	19	21	14	30+4=34	26+6=32	66	25+6=31	26+0=26		
Johanna & Tobias W.	5	14	19	33	22	18	23	23+4=27	29+2=31	58	19+8=27			
Tone & Hugo	6	8	10	18	19	23	28	27+4=31	28+4=32	63				
Andreas & Ida	7	8	14	22	14	20	21							
Kodjo & Jasmin	8	7	11	18	11	18								
Johan & Hedvig	9	5	13	18	13									
Nilla & Cecilia	10	11	13	24										

Red numbers indicate the lowest score of each week.
Green numbers indicate the highest score of each week.
indicates the couple that was eliminated that week.
indicates the couple received the lowest score of the week and was eliminated.
indicates the couple withdrew from the competition.
indicates the couple returned to the competition after previously being eliminated.
indicates the couple finished in the bottom two.
indicates the couple earned immunity from elimination.
indicates the winning couple.
indicates the runner-up couple.
indicates the third place couple.

=== Average chart ===
Rank by average	Place	Couple	Total points	Number of dances	Total average
1	1	Hampus & Ines	354	14	25.3
2	3	Renaida & Tobias B.	244	11	22.2
3	2	Charlotte & Tobias K.	302	14	21.6
4	5	Johanna & Tobias W.	167	8	20.9
5	4	Rickard & Tove	187	9	20.8
6	6	Tone & Hugo	143	7	20.4
7	7	Andreas & Ida	77	5	15.4
8	10	Nilla & Cecilia	24	2	12.0
9	8	Kodjo & Jasmin	47	4	11.8
10	9	Johan & Hedvig	31	3	10.3
