= Let's Dance 2019 =

- Season 2019
- Celebrity winner: Kristin Kaspersen
- Professional winner: Calle Sterner
- No. of episodes: 11

Release
- Original network: TV4
- Original release: 22 March – 31 May 2019

Season chronology
- ← Previous; Let's Dance 2018 Next → Let's Dance 2020

Kristin Kaspersen, celebrity winner

Let's Dance 2019 was the fourteenth season of the Swedish celebrity dancing show Let's Dance. The season premiered on 22 March 2019, and was broadcast on TV4. Presenters were Tilde de Paula Eby and David Hellenius.

== Contestants ==
Celebrity	Occupation	Professional partner	Status
Méndez	Singer & DJ	Malin Watson	Eliminated 1st on 29 March 2019
Fredrik Svensson	Television host	Maria Zimmerman	Eliminated 2nd on 5 April 2019
Sanna Lundell	Television host & journalist	Aaron Brown	Eliminated 3rd on 12 April 2019
Dan Ekborg	Actor	Cecilia Ehrling	Eliminated 4th on 19 April 2019
LaGaylia Frazier	Singer	Tobias Bader	Eliminated 5th on 26 April 2019
Thomas Ravelli	Former footballer	Jasmine Takács	Eliminated 6th on 3 May 2019
Robin Bengtsson	Singer	Sigrid Bernson	Eliminated 7th on 10 May 2019
Linnéa Claeson	Handball player	Jacob Persson	Eliminated 8th on 17 May 2019
Lance Hedman Graaf	Singer	Linn Hegdal	Third Place on 24 May 2019
Magdalena Forsberg	Biathlete	Fredric Brunberg	Runners-up on 31 May 2019
Kristin Kaspersen	Television host	Calle Sterner	Winners on 31 May 2019

== Scoring chart ==
Couple	Place	1	2	1+2	3	4	5	6	7	8	9		10	11
Kristin & Calle	1	18	21	39	17	25	27	26+12=38	30+10=40	40+6=46	26	–	30+30=60	30+29+30=89
Magdalena & Fredric	2	10	9	19	15	21	19	24+14=38	15+6=21	32+2=34	23	30	29+28=57	25+29+27=81
Lance & Linn	3	14	12	26	9	16	24	23+6=29	25+8=33	38+10=48	30	–	29+29=58	
Linnéa & Jacob	4	14	14	28	20	19	23	26+10=36	29+12=41	35+8=43	28	27		
Robin & Sigrid	5	8	14	22	16	15	18	20+4=24	23+4=27	34+4=38				
Thomas & Jasmine	6	3	7	10	8	8	16	16+2=18	15+2=17					
LaGaylia & Tobias	7	11	15	26	14	22	22	22+8=30						
Dan & Cecilia	8	5	13	18	12	12	12							
Sanna & Aaron	9	6	12	18	15	15								
Fredrik & Maria	10	7	13	20	12									
DJ Méndez & Malin	11	8	10	18										

Red numbers indicate the lowest score of each week.
Green numbers indicate the highest score of each week.
indicates the couple that was eliminated that week.
indicates the couple received the lowest score of the week and was eliminated.
indicates the couple finished in the bottom two.
indicates the couple earned immunity from elimination.
indicates the winning couple.
indicates the runner-up couple.
indicates the third place couple.

=== Average chart ===
Rank by average	Place	Couple	Total points	Number of dances	Total average
1	1	Kristin & Calle	369	14	26.4
2	4	Linnéa & Jacob	226	10	22.6
3	2	Magdalena & Fredric	328	15	21.9
4	3	Lance & Linn	239	11	21.7
5	7	LaGaylia & Tobias	106	6	17.7
6	5	Robin & Sigrid	138	8	17.3
7	9	Sanna & Aaron	48	4	12.0
8	8	Dan & Cecilia	54	5	10.8
9	10	Fredrik & Maria	32	3	10.7
10	6	Thomas & Jasmine	73	7	10.4
11	11	DJ Méndez & Malin	18	2	9.0
