= Let's Dance 2016 =

- Season 2016
- Celebrity winner: Elisa Lindström
- Professional winner: Yvo Eussen
- No. of episodes: 11

Release
- Original network: TV4
- Original release: 11 March – 20 May 2016

Season chronology
- ← Previous; Let's Dance 2015 Next → Let's Dance 2017

Let's Dance 2016 was the eleventh season of the Swedish celebrity dancing show Let's Dance. The season was hosted by David Hellenius and Jessica Almenäs. The show was broadcast on TV4.

== Couples ==
Celebrity	Occupation	Professional partner	Status
Ewa Fröling	Actress and director	Tobias Wallin	Eliminated 1st on 18 March 2016
Johan Rabaeus	Actor	Cecilia Ehrling	Eliminated 2nd on 25 March 2016
Isabel Adrian Angello	Reality television star	Fredric Brunberg	Eliminated 3rd on 1 April 2016
Toni Prince	Influencer	Elisabeth Novotny	Eliminated 4th on 8 April 2016
Pia Johansson	Actress	Marc Christensen	Eliminated 5th on 15 April 2016
Rickard Söderberg	Singer	Maria Zimmerman	Eliminated 6th on 22 April 2016
Nassim Al Fakir	Musician & television host	Jeanette Carlsson	Eliminated 7th on 29 April 2016
Linda Lindorff	Television host	Kristjan Lootus	Eliminated 8th on 6 May 2016
Thomas Wassberg	Cross-country skier	Malin Watson	Third place on 13 May 2016
Bianca Wahlgren Ingrosso	Singer & influencer	Alexander Svanberg	Second place on 20 May 2016
Elisa Lindström	Singer	Yvo Eussen	Winners on 20 May 2016

== Scoring chart ==
Couple	Place	1	2	1+2	3	4	5	6	7	8 (Note: A guest judge was on the panel)	9	10	11	Average
Elisa & Yvo	1	17	19	36	22	26	26	28+12=40	25	40+10=50	26+28=54	30+27=57	29+30+30=89	26.2
Bianca & Alexander	2	16	21	37	17	24	30	27+14=41	24	38+8=46	30+29=59	30+29=59	30+30+30=90	26.3
Thomas & Malin	3	7	7	14	9	14	15	12+2=14	13	26+2=28	19+18=37	16+18=34		13.9
Linda & Kristjan	4	10	9	19	14	14	16	26+8=34	17	30+4=34	20+23=43			17.1
Nassim & Jeanette	5	15	15	30	19	19	24	22+10=32	28	32+6=38				20.8
Rickard & Maria	6	12	13	25	21	23	25	18+4=22	21					19.0
Pia & Marc	7	9	16	25	13	19	21	14+6=20						15.3
Toni & Elisabeth	8	14	16	30	15	20	18							16.6
Isabel & Fredric	9	8	9	17	12	11								10.0
Johan & Cecilia	10	5	9	14	11									8.3
Ewa & Tobias	11	7	12	19										9.5

== Dance chart ==
Couple	1	2	3	4	5	6		7	8		9		10		11		
Elisa & Yvo	Samba	American Smooth	Quickstep	Flamenco	Tango	Cha-Cha-Cha	Broadway	Rumba	Foxtrot	Film Dance	Jive	Fusion Dance	Hip-Hop	Tango	Rumba	Foxtrot	Showdance
Bianca & Alexander	Tango	Jive	Foxtrot	Paso Doble	American Smooth	Quickstep	Broadway	Samba	Rumba	Film Dance	Cha-Cha-Cha	Fusion Dance	Modern Dance	Samba	Rumba	American Smooth	Showdance
Thomas & Malin	American Smooth	Samba	Rumba	Viennese Waltz	Cha-Cha-Cha	Foxtrot	Broadway	Quickstep	Jive	Film Dance	Tango	Fusion Dance	Disco	Quickstep			
Linda & Kristjan	American Smooth	Samba	Rumba	Bugg	Cha-Cha-Cha	Foxtrot	Broadway	Quickstep	Jive	Film Dance	Tango	Fusion Dance					
Nassim & Jeanette	Samba	American Smooth	Quickstep	Salsa	Tango	Cha-Cha-Cha	Broadway	Rumba	Foxtrot	Film Dance							
Rickard & Maria	Tango	Jive	Foxtrot	Charleston	American Smooth	Quickstep	Broadway	Samba									
Pia & Marc	Samba	American Smooth	Quickstep	Bugg	Tango	Cha-Cha-Cha	Broadway										
Toni & Elisabeth	Cha-Cha-Cha	Tango	Jive	Lambada	Samba												
Isabel & Adrian	Cha-Cha-Cha	Tango	Jive	Lindy Hop													
Johan & Cecilia	Tango	Jive	Foxtrot														
Ewa & Tobias	Cha-Cha-Cha	Tango															
