= Let's Dance 2025 =

- Season 2025
- Celebrity winner: Theo Haraldsson
- Professional winner: Paulina Rosenkvist

Release
- Original network: TV4
- Original release: 15 March 2025

Season chronology
- ← Previous; Let's Dance 2023

Let's Dance 2025 is the nineteenth season of the Swedish television celebrity dance competition series Let's Dance. The season premieres on 15 March 2025 on TV4, after a one year hiatus. New presenters for this season will be Pär Lernström and Johanna Nordström. Tony Irving will be joined by new judges Eric Saade and Taya Shawki.

== Celebrity dancers ==
- Arantxa Alvarez
- Carolina Klüft
- Cecilia Frode
- Christopher Wollter
- Ciara Zelmerlöw
- David Lindgren
- Ferry Svan
- Isa Östling
- Malin Stenbäck
- Manoel "Junior" Marques Lerin
- Mini Andén
- Perla Malmberg
- Rickard Olsson
- Theo Haraldsson
- Tommy Myllymäki
