= Let's Dance 2010 =

- Season 2010
- Celebrity winner: Mattias Andréasson
- Professional winner: Cecilia Ehrling
- No. of episodes: 12

Release
- Original network: TV4
- Original release: 8 January – 26 March 2010

Season chronology
- ← Previous; Let's Dance 2009 Next → Let's Dance 2011

Let's Dance 2010 was the fifth season of the Swedish version of the celebrity dance show Strictly Come Dancing. It was broadcast on the Swedish free-to-air television channel TV4, starting on 8 January 2010 and ending on 26 March 2010.

== Couples ==
| Celebrity | Occupation | Professional partner | Status |
|---|---|---|---|
| Victoria Sandell Svensson | Soccer Player | Anders Jacobson | Eliminated 1st on 15 January 2010 |
| Peter Wahlbeck | Stand-up Comedian | Maria Bild | Eliminated 2nd on 22 January 2010 |
| Agneta Sjödin | Author & TV-Host | Tobias Karlsson | Eliminated 3rd on 29 January 2010 |
| Rabih Jaber | Idol 2009 Contestant | Maria Lindberg; Oksana Spichak (Week 3–4) | Eliminated 4th on 5 February 2010 |
| Marcus Birro | Author & Poet | Helena Fransson | Eliminated 5th on 12 February 2010 |
| Elin Kling | Fashion Journalist | Daniel da Silva | Eliminated 6th on 19 February 2010 |
| Gudrun Schyman | Politician | Björn Törnblom | Eliminated 7th on 26 February 2010 |
| Stefan Sauk | Actor | Malin Johansson | Eliminated 8th on 5 March 2010 |
| Molly Sandén | Singer | Jonathan Näslund | Eliminated 9th on 12 March 2010 |
| Willy Björkman | TV-Carpenter | Charlotte Sinclair | Third Place on 19 March 2010 |
| Claudia Galli | Actress & Comedian | Tobias Wallin | Second Place on 26 March 2010 |
| Mattias Andréasson | Artist & Idol 2007 Contestant | Cecilia Ehrling | Winners on 26 March 2010 |

== Scoring chart ==
| Couple | Place | 1 | 2 | 1+2 | 3 | 4 | 5 | 6 | 7 | 8 | 9 | 10 | 11 | 12 |
|---|---|---|---|---|---|---|---|---|---|---|---|---|---|---|
| Mattias & Cecilia | 1 | 22 | 27 | 49 | 33 | 26 | 32 | 26 | 33 | 28 | 35 | 37+40=77 | 36+39=75 | 36+40+40=116 |
| Claudia & Tobias W. | 2 | 26 | 20 | 46 | 32 | 25 | 31 | 27 | 36 | 31 | 28 | 40+37=77 | 38+40=78 | 37+39+39=115 |
| Willy & Charlotte | 3 | 6 | 15 | 21 | 9 | 10 | 11 | 13 | 15 | 17 | 9 | 26+21=47 | 11+23=34 | |
| Molly & Jonathan | 4 | 25 | 10 | 35 | 23 | 13 | 20 | 24 | 26 | 24 | 37 | 32+30=62 | | |
| Stefan & Malin | 5 | 17 | 23 | 40 | 23 | 38 | 35 | 30 | 33 | 36 | 24 | | | |
| Gudrun & Björn | 6 | 17 | 23 | 40 | 20 | 19 | 24 | 15 | 19 | 18 | | | | |
| Elin & Daniel | 7 | 11 | 12 | 23 | 22 | 23 | 23 | 22 | 26 | | | | | |
| Marcus & Helena | 8 | 12 | 14 | 26 | 10 | 14 | 9 | 10 | | | | | | |
| Rabih & Maria L. | 9 | 12 | 7 | 19 | 11 | 16 | 12 | | | | | | | |
| Agneta & Tobias K. | 10 | 25 | 16 | 41 | 24 | 24 | | | | | | | | |
| Peter & Maria B. | 11 | 15 | 21 | 36 | 14 | | | | | | | | | |
| Victoria & Anders | 12 | 10 | 15 | 25 | | | | | | | | | | |

Red numbers indicate the lowest score for each week.
Green numbers indicate the highest score for each week.
indicates the couple (or couples) eliminated that week.
indicates the returning couple that finished in the bottom two (or bottom three).
indicates the returning couple that was the last to be called safe.
indicates the winning couple.
indicates the runner-up couple.
indicates the third place couple.

- ^1 The first week didn't eliminate any couple, instead it was announced which three couples who was in the bottom three going into Week 2.
- ^2 Since Week 1 was a non-elimination week, Week 2 featured a combined score of both Week 1 and 2, which was used in the final standings.

== Average chart ==
| Rank by average | Place | Couple | Total | Number of dances | Average |
|---|---|---|---|---|---|
| 1 | 1 | Mattias & Cecilia | 530 | 16 | 33.1 |
| 2 | 2 | Claudia & Tobias W. | 526 | 16 | 32.9 |
| 3 | 5 | Stefan & Malin | 259 | 9 | 28.8 |
| 4 | 4 | Molly & Jonathan | 264 | 11 | 24.0 |
| 5 | 10 | Agneta & Tobias K. | 89 | 4 | 22.3 |
| 6 | 7 | Elin & Daniel | 139 | 7 | 19.9 |
| 7 | 6 | Gudrun & Björn | 155 | 8 | 19.4 |
| 8 | 11 | Peter & Maria B. | 50 | 3 | 16.7 |
| 9 | 3 | Willy & Charlotte | 186 | 13 | 14.3 |
| 10 | 12 | Victoria & Anders | 25 | 2 | 12.5 |
| 11 | 9 | Rabih & Maria L. | 58 | 5 | 11.6 |
| 12 | 8 | Marcus & Helena | 69 | 6 | 11.5 |

=== Average dance chart ===
| Couples | Averages | Best Dance(s) | Worst Dance(s) |
|---|---|---|---|
| Mattias & Cecilia | 33.1 | Bugg & Show Dance (40) | Cha Cha Cha (22) |
| Claudia & Tobias W. | 32.9 | Salsa & Jive (40) | Tango (20) |
| Willy & Charlotte | 14.3 | Salsa (26) | Cha Cha Cha (6) |
| Molly & Jonathan | 24.0 | Slowfox (37) | Rumba (10) |
| Stefan & Malin | 28.8 | Slowfox (38) | Cha Cha Cha (17) |
| Gudrun & Björn | 19.4 | Waltz (24) | Samba (15) |
| Elin & Daniel | 19.9 | Rumba (26) | Cha Cha Cha (11) |
| Marcus & Helena | 11.5 | Rumba & Paso Doble (14) | Cha Cha Cha (9) |
| Rabih & Maria L. | 11.6 | Paso Doble (16) | Rumba (7) |
| Agneta & Tobias K. | 22.3 | Waltz (25) | Rumba (16) |
| Peter & Maria B. | 16.7 | Rumba (21) | Quickstep (14) |
| Victoria & Anders | 12.5 | Rumba (15) | Waltz (10) |

== Highest and lowest scoring performances ==
The best and worst performances in each dance according to the judges' marks are as follows:

| Dance | Best dancer(s) | Best score | Worst dancer(s) | Worst score |
|---|---|---|---|---|
| Cha Cha Cha | Claudia Galli | 37 | Willy Björkman | 6 |
| Waltz | Stefan Sauk | 35 | Victoria Sandell Svensson | 10 |
| Rumba | Claudia Galli | 36 | Rabih Jaber | 7 |
| Tango | Claudia Galli | 38 | Elin Kling | 12 |
| Jive | Claudia Galli | 40 | Willy Björkman | 9 |
| Quickstep | Mattias Andréasson | 36 | Willy Björkman | 9 |
| Paso Doble | Stefan Sauk | 36 | Molly Sandén | 13 |
| Slowfox | Stefan Sauk | 38 | Willy Björkman | 10 |
| Samba | Stefan Sauk | 30 | Marcus Birro | 10 |
| Salsa | Claudia Galli | 40 | Willy Björkman | 26 |
| Bugg | Mattias Andréasson | 40 | Willy Björkman | 21 |
| Show Dance | Mattias Andréasson | 40 | Claudia Galli | 39 |

=== Dance schedule ===
The celebrities and professional partners danced one of these routines for each corresponding week.

- Week 1: Cha-cha-cha or Waltz
- Week 2: Rumba or Tango
- Week 3: Jive or Quickstep
- Week 4: Paso Doble or Slowfox
- Week 5: (Disco Theme) – Cha-cha-cha or Waltz
- Week 6: Samba
- Week 7: Rumba or Tango
- Week 8: (Musical Theme) – Paso Doble or Jive
- Week 9: Quickstep or Slowfox + Bonus Dances
- Week 10: Salsa and Bugg
- Week 11: Jive, Tango or Cha-cha-cha
- Week 12: Finals – Quickstep, Bugg, Cha-cha-cha or Salsa and Show Dance

== Songs ==
=== Week 1 ===
Individual judges scores in charts below (given in parentheses) are listed in this order from left to right: Maria Öhrman, Dermot Clemenger, Ann Wilson and Tony Irving.

Running order

| Couple | Score | Style | Music |
|---|---|---|---|
| Stefan & Malin | 17 (4,5,4,4) | Cha Cha Cha | "Ayo Technology" – Milow |
| Victoria & Anders | 10 (2,3,3,2) | Waltz | "Three Times A Lady" – The Commodores |
| Mattias & Cecilia | 22 (5,6,5,6) | Cha Cha Cha | "Please Don't Leave Me" – Pink |
| Molly & Jonathan | 25 (7,7,6,5) | Waltz | "Somewhere" – from West Side Story |
| Willy & Charlotte | 6 (1,2,2,1) | Cha Cha Cha | "Take On Me" – a-ha |
| Elin & Daniel | 11 (3,3,3,2) | Cha Cha Cha | "Do You Love Me" – Amanda Jenssen |
| Peter & Maria B. | 15 (4,4,4,3) | Waltz | "Unchained Melody" – The Righteous Brothers |
| Gudrun & Björn | 17 (4,5,4,4) | Cha Cha Cha | "Don't Go Breaking My Heart" – Elton John & Kiki Dee |
| Marcus & Helena | 12 (3,3,3,3) | Waltz | "Perfect Day" – Lou Reed |
| Claudia & Tobias W. | 26 (6,7,6,7) | Cha Cha Cha | "Poker Face" – Lady Gaga |
| Rabih & Maria L. | 12 (3,4,3,2) | Waltz | "The Last Waltz" – Engelbert Humperdinck |
| Agneta & Tobias K. | 25 (6,6,6,7) | Waltz | "Somewhere Over The Rainbow" – from The Wizard of Oz |

=== Week 2 ===
Individual judges scores in charts below (given in parentheses) are listed in this order from left to right: Maria Öhrman, Dermot Clemenger, Ann Wilson and Tony Irving.

Running order

| Couple | Score | Style | Music |
|---|---|---|---|
| Agneta & Tobias K. | 16 (4,4,4,4) | Rumba | "True Colours" – Cyndi Lauper |
| Peter & Maria B. | 21 (5,6,5,5) | Rumba | "One" – U2 |
| Elin & Daniel | 12 (3,4,3,2) | Tango | "Boom Boom Pow" – The Black Eyed Peas |
| Rabih & Maria L. | 7 (2,2,2,1) | Rumba | "Sealed with a Kiss" – Bobby Vinton |
| Claudia & Tobias W. | 20 (5,5,5,5) | Tango | "I've Seen That Face Before (Libertango)" – Grace Jones |
| Willy & Charlotte | 15 (4,4,4,3) | Tango | "Min älskling (Du är som en ros)" – Evert Taube |
| Victoria & Anders | 15 (3,4,4,4) | Rumba | "Halo" – Beyoncé |
| Mattias & Cecilia | 27 (7,7,7,6) | Tango | "Release Me" – Agnes |
| Stefan & Malin | 23 (6,6,5,6) | Tango | "Eleanor Rigby" – The Beatles |
| Molly & Jonathan | 10 (2,3,3,2) | Rumba | "Is It True?" – Yohanna |
| Marcus & Helena | 14 (3,4,4,3) | Rumba | "This Is Not America" – David Bowie |
| Gudrun & Björn | 23 (6,6,6,5) | Tango | "Doktorn" – Agnetha Fältskog |

=== Week 3 ===
Individual judges scores in charts below (given in parentheses) are listed in this order from left to right: Maria Öhrman, Dermot Clemenger, Ann Wilson and Tony Irving.

Running order

| Couple | Score | Style | Music |
|---|---|---|---|
| Claudia & Tobias W. | 32 (8,8,8,8) | Jive | "Womanizer" – Britney Spears |
| Marcus & Helena | 10 (3,2,3,2) | Quickstep | "Not Fair" – Lily Allen |
| Molly & Jonathan | 23 (5,7,7,4) | Quickstep | "Fairytale" – Alexander Rybak |
| Peter & Maria B. | 14 (3,4,4,3) | Quickstep | "I Gotta Feeling" – The Black Eyed Peas |
| Rabih & Oksana^{4} | 11 (3,3,3,2) | Quickstep | "The Boy Does Nothing" – Alesha Dixon |
| Gudrun & Björn | 20 (5,5,5,5) | Jive | "My Baby Just Cares for Me" – Nina Simone |
| Stefan & Malin | 23 (5,6,6,6) | Jive | "Stay the Night" – Alcazar |
| Elin & Daniel | 22 (6,6,6,4) | Jive | "All That She Wants" – Ace of Base |
| Willy & Charlotte | 9 (1,3,3,2) | Jive | "These Boots Are Made for Walkin'" – Nancy Sinatra |
| Agneta & Tobias K. | 24 (7,6,6,5) | Quickstep | "Puttin' On The Ritz" – Fred Astaire |
| Mattias & Cecilia | 33 (7,8,9,9) | Jive | "Right Round" – Flo Rida |

- ^4 Rabih Jaber's partner Maria Lindberg was sidelined with pneumonia and was replaced with dancer Oksana Spichak.

=== Week 4 ===
Individual judges scores in charts below (given in parentheses) are listed in this order from left to right: Maria Öhrman, Dermot Clemenger, Ann Wilson and Tony Irving.

Running order

| Couple | Score | Style | Music |
|---|---|---|---|
| Molly & Jonathan | 13 (3,3,4,3) | Paso Doble | "The Only Ones" – Melody Club |
| Gudrun & Björn | 19 (5,5,5,4) | Slowfox | "Morning Train" – Sheena Easton |
| Marcus & Helena | 14 (3,4,4,3) | Paso Doble | "I Was Made for Lovin' You" – Kiss |
| Elin & Daniel | 23 (6,6,6,5) | Slowfox | "Mama Do (Uh Oh, Uh Oh)" – Pixie Lott |
| Mattias & Cecilia | 26 (6,6,7,7) | Slowfox | "21 Guns" – Green Day |
| Rabih & Oksana^{4} | 16 (3,5,5,3) | Paso Doble | "Hurtful" – Erik Hassle |
| Agneta & Tobias | 24 (7,6,6,5) | Paso Doble | "Don't You (Forget About Me)" – Simple Minds |
| Willy & Charlotte | 10 (3,3,3,1) | Slowfox | "Gotta Be Somebody" – Nickelback |
| Claudia & Tobias | 25 (6,7,6,6) | Slowfox | "Give Me a Call" – Pauline |
| Stefan & Malin | 38 (10,9,9,10) | Slowfox | "(They Long to Be) Close to You" – The Carpenters |

=== Week 5 ===
Individual judges scores in charts below (given in parentheses) are listed in this order from left to right: Maria Öhrman, Dermot Clemenger, Ann Wilson and Tony Irving.

Running order

| Couple | Score | Style | Music |
|---|---|---|---|
| Rabih & Maria L. | 12 (3,3,3,3) | Cha Cha Cha | "Funkytown" – Lipps Inc |
| Willy & Charlotte | 11 (3,3,3,2) | Waltz | "Sunny" – Boney M. |
| Molly & Jonathan | 20 (5,5,5,5) | Cha Cha Cha | "This Is It" – Melba Moore |
| Claudia & Tobias W. | 31 (7,9,8,7) | Waltz | "When I Need You" – Leo Sayer |
| Gudrun & Björn | 24 (6,6,6,6) | Waltz | "Don't Leave Me This Way" – Thelma Houston |
| Marcus & Helena | 9 (2,3,3,1) | Cha Cha Cha | "Hot Stuff" – Donna Summer |
| Mattias & Cecilia | 32 (8,8,8,8) | Waltz | "Could It Be Magic" – Donna Summer |
| Stefan & Malin | 35 (9,9,8,9) | Waltz | "I Will Survive" – Gloria Gaynor |
| Elin & Daniel | 23 (5,7,6,5) | Waltz | "Never Can Say Goodbye" – Gloria Gaynor |

=== Week 6 ===
Individual judges scores in charts below (given in parentheses) are listed in this order from left to right: Maria Öhrman, Dermot Clemenger, Ann Wilson and Tony Irving.

Running order

| Couple | Score | Style | Music |
|---|---|---|---|
| Willy & Charlotte | 13 (2,3,4,4) | Samba | "You're the First, the Last, My Everything" – Barry White |
| Elin & Daniel | 22 (6,6,6,4) | Samba | "Rap das Armas" – Cidinho and Doca |
| Stefan & Malin | 30 (7,8,8,7) | Samba | "Tom's Diner" – Suzanne Vega |
| Marcus & Helena | 10 (2,3,3,2) | Samba | "When Love Takes Over" – David Guetta feat. Kelly Rowland |
| Molly & Jonathan | 24 (6,6,6,6) | Samba | "Fantasi" – Freestyle |
| Mattias & Cecilia | 26 (5,7,7,7) | Samba | "When It Was Good" – Flipsyde |
| Gudrun & Björn | 15 (3,4,5,3) | Samba | "Heart of Glass" – Blondie |
| Claudia & Tobias W. | 27 (7,7,7,6) | Samba | "There Must Be an Angel (Playing with My Heart)" – Eurythmics |

=== Week 7 ===
Individual judges scores in charts below (given in parentheses) are listed in this order from left to right: Maria Öhrman, Dermot Clemenger, Ann Wilson and Tony Irving.

Running order

| Couple | Score | Style | Music |
|---|---|---|---|
| Elin & Daniel | 26 (7,7,7,5) | Rumba | "It Must Have Been Love" – Roxette |
| Mattias & Cecilia | 33 (8,8,8,9) | Rumba | "Nothing Compares 2 U" – Sinéad O'Connor |
| Molly & Jonathan | 26 (6,7,6,7) | Tango | "Bad Romance" – Lady Gaga |
| Gudrun & Björn | 19 (5,5,5,4) | Rumba | "Vi blundar" – Caroline af Ugglas |
| Claudia & Tobias W. | 36 (9,9,9,9) | Rumba | "I Don't Believe You" – Pink |
| Stefan & Malin | 33 (9,8,8,8) | Rumba | "Let's Get It On" – Marvin Gaye |
| Willy & Charlotte | 15 (3,4,4,4) | Rumba | "New Love in Town" – Europe |

=== Week 8 ===
Individual judges scores in charts below (given in parentheses) are listed in this order from left to right: Maria Öhrman, Dermot Clemenger, Ann Wilson and Tony Irving.

Running order

| Couple | Score | Style | Music |
|---|---|---|---|
| Mattias & Cecilia | 28 (6,6,8,8) | Paso Doble | "Voulez-Vous" – from Mamma Mia! |
| Gudrun & Björn | 18 (4,5,5,4) | Paso Doble | "Don't Cry for Me Argentina" – from Evita |
| Claudia & Tobias W. | 31 (8,8,7,8) | Paso Doble | "Flashdance... What a Feeling" – from Flashdance |
| Willy & Charlotte | 17 (4,5,5,3) | Paso Doble | "The Phantom of the Opera" – from The Phantom of the Opera |
| Molly & Jonathan | 24 (7,6,6,5) | Jive | "I Got Life" – from Hair |
| Stefan & Malin | 36 (9,9,9,9) | Paso Doble | "(I've Had) The Time of My Life" – from Dirty Dancing |

=== Week 9 ===
Individual judges scores in charts below (given in parentheses) are listed in this order from left to right: Maria Öhrman, Dermot Clemenger, Ann Wilson and Tony Irving.

Running order

| Couple | Score | Style | Music |
|---|---|---|---|
| Stefan & Malin | 24 (6,6,6,6) | Quickstep | "Walking on Sunshine" – Katrina and the Waves |
| Stefan & Malin | (Bonus Dance) | Soft Shoe | "King Porter Stomp" – Benny Goodman |
| Claudia & Tobias W. | 28 (7,7,7,7) | Quickstep | "Part-Time Lover" – Stevie Wonder |
| Claudia & Tobias W. | (Bonus Dance) | Bollywood | "Dhoom Taana" – from Om Shanti Om |
| Mattias & Cecilia | 35 (9,8,9,9) | Quickstep | "Don't Get Me Wrong" – Pretenders |
| Mattias & Cecilia | (Bonus Dance) | Bachata | "Obsesión" – Aventura |
| Willy & Charlotte | 9 (3,2,3,1) | Quickstep | "You Can't Hurry Love" – The Supremes |
| Willy & Charlotte | (Bonus Dance) | Flamenco | "Entre dos aguas" – Paco de Lucía |
| Molly & Jonathan | 37 (9,9,9,10) | Slowfox | "Words" – F. R. David |
| Molly & Jonathan | (Bonus Dance) | Lindy Hop | "In the Mood" – Glenn Miller |

=== Week 10 ===
Individual judges scores in charts below (given in parentheses) are listed in this order from left to right: Maria Öhrman, Dermot Clemenger, Ann Wilson and Tony Irving.

Running order

| Couple | Score | Style | Music |
|---|---|---|---|
| Willy & Charlotte | 26 (6,7,7,6) | Salsa | "Så klart!" – Petter |
| Willy & Charlotte | 21 (4,7,6,4) | Bugg | "Solglasögon" – Docenterna |
| Molly & Jonathan | 32 (8,8,8,8) | Salsa | "Varje gång jag ser dig" – Lisa Nilsson |
| Molly & Jonathan | 30 (7,8,7,8) | Bugg | "Eloise" – Arvingarna |
| Mattias & Cecilia | 37 (9,9,9,10) | Salsa | "Känn ingen sorg för mig Göteborg" – Håkan Hellström |
| Mattias & Cecilia | 40 (10,10,10,10) | Bugg | "I natt är jag din" – Tomas Ledin |
| Claudia & Tobias W. | 40 (10,10,10,10) | Salsa | "En kväll i juni" – Lasse Berghagen |
| Claudia & Tobias W. | 37 (10,9,9,9) | Bugg | "Inget stoppar oss nu" – Black Ingvars |

=== Week 11 ===
Individual judges scores in charts below (given in parentheses) are listed in this order from left to right: Maria Öhrman, Dermot Clemenger, Ann Wilson and Tony Irving.

Running order

| Couple | Score | Style | Music |
|---|---|---|---|
| Claudia & Tobias W. | 38 (10,10,9,9) | Tango | "I've Seen That Face Before (Libertango)" – Grace Jones |
| Claudia & Tobias W. | 40 (10,10,10,10) | Jive | "Womanizer" – Britney Spears |
| Willy & Charlotte | 11 (3,3,3,2) | Jive | "These Boots Are Made for Walkin'" – Nancy Sinatra |
| Willy & Charlotte | 23 (6,6,6,5) | Tango | "Min älskling (Du är som en ros)" – Evert Taube |
| Mattias & Cecilia | 36 (9,9,9,9) | Cha Cha Cha | "Please Don't Leave Me" – Pink |
| Mattias & Cecilia | 39 (9,10,10,10) | Jive | "Right Round" – Flo Rida |

=== Week 12 ===
Individual judges scores in charts below (given in parentheses) are listed in this order from left to right: Maria Öhrman, Dermot Clemenger, Ann Wilson and Tony Irving.

Running order

| Couple | Score | Style | Music |
|---|---|---|---|
| Mattias & Cecilia | 36 (9,9,9,9) | Quickstep | "Don't Get Me Wrong" – Pretenders |
| Mattias & Cecilia | 40 (10,10,10,10) | Bugg | "I natt är jag din" – Tomas Ledin |
| Mattias & Cecilia | 40 (10,10,10,10) | Show Dance | "Beat It" – Michael Jackson |
| Claudia & Tobias W. | 37 (10,9,9,9) | Cha Cha Cha | "Poker Face" – Lady Gaga |
| Claudia & Tobias W. | 39 (10,10,10,9) | Salsa | "En kväll i juni" – Lasse Berghagen |
| Claudia & Tobias W. | 39 (10,10,10,9) | Show Dance | "Your Song" – from Moulin Rouge! |

== Call-out order ==
The table below lists the order in which the contestants' fates were revealed. The order of the safe couples doesn't reflect the viewer voting results.

| Order | 1^{3} | 2 | 3 | 4 | 5 | 6 | 7 | 8 | 9 | 10 | 11 | 12 |
|---|---|---|---|---|---|---|---|---|---|---|---|---|
| 1 | Mattias & Cecilia | Mattias & Cecilia | Mattias & Cecilia | Stefan & Malin | Stefan & Malin | Stefan & Malin | Claudia & Tobias W. | Stefan & Malin | Molly & Jonathan | Claudia & Tobias W. | Mattias & Cecilia | Mattias & Cecilia |
| 2 | Marcus & Helena | Claudia & Tobias W. | Claudia & Tobias W. | Rabih & Oksana^{4} | Molly & Jonathan | Willy & Charlotte | Willy & Charlotte | Claudia & Tobias W. | Claudia & Tobias W. | Mattias & Cecilia | Claudia & Tobias W. | Claudia & Tobias W. |
| 3 | Willy & Charlotte | Rabih & Maria L. | Willy & Charlotte | Claudia & Tobias W. | Gudrun & Björn | Claudia & Tobias W. | Mattias & Cecilia | Willy & Charlotte | Mattias & Cecilia | Willy & Charlotte | Willy & Charlotte | |
| 4 | Claudia & Tobias W. | Gudrun & Björn | Gudrun & Björn | Willy & Charlotte | Mattias & Cecilia | Molly & Jonathan | Stefan & Malin | Molly & Jonathan | Willy & Charlotte | Molly & Jonathan | | |
| 5 | Rabih & Maria L. | Stefan & Malin | Elin & Daniel | Molly & Jonathan | Elin & Daniel | Mattias & Cecilia | Molly & Jonathan | Mattias & Cecilia | Stefan & Malin | | | |
| 6 | Molly & Jonathan | Agneta & Tobias K. | Agneta & Tobias K. | Mattias & Cecilia | Claudia & Tobias W. | Gudrun & Björn | Gudrun & Björn | Gudrun & Björn | | | | |
| 7 | Stefan & Malin | Willy & Charlotte | Molly & Jonathan | Marcus & Helena | Willy & Charlotte | Elin & Daniel | Elin & Daniel | | | | | |
| 8 | Gudrun & Björn | Marcus & Helena | Stefan & Malin | Gudrun & Björn | Marcus & Helena | Marcus & Helena | | | | | | |
| 9 | Agneta & Tobias K. | Peter & Maria B. | Marcus & Helena | Elin & Daniel | Rabih & Maria L. | | | | | | | |
| 10 | Victoria & Anders | Molly & Jonathan | Rabih & Oksana^{4} | Agneta & Tobias K. | | | | | | | | |
| 11 | Peter & Maria B. | Elin & Daniel | Peter & Maria B. | | | | | | | | | |
| 12 | Elin & Daniel | Victoria & Anders | | | | | | | | | | |

This couple came in first place with the judges.
This couple came in last place with the judges.
This couple came in last place with the judges and was eliminated.
This couple was in the bottom three, but was not eliminated.
This couple was eliminated.
This couple won the competition.
This couple came in second in the competition.

- ^3 The first week didn't eliminate any couple, instead it was announced which three couples who was in the bottom three going into Week 2. The orders for the safe couples wasn't announced, therefore no particular order.

== Dance chart ==
| Couple | 1 | 2 | 3 | 4 | 5 | 6 | 7 | 8 | 9 | 10 | | 11 | | 12 | | |
|---|---|---|---|---|---|---|---|---|---|---|---|---|---|---|---|---|
| Mattias & Cecilia | Cha Cha Cha | Tango | Jive | Slowfox | Waltz | Samba | Rumba | Paso Doble | Quickstep | Salsa | Bugg | Cha Cha Cha | Jive | Quickstep | Bugg | Show Dance |
| Claudia & Tobias W. | Cha Cha Cha | Tango | Jive | Slowfox | Waltz | Samba | Rumba | Paso Doble | Quickstep | Salsa | Bugg | Tango | Jive | Cha Cha Cha | Salsa | Show Dance |
| Willy & Charlotte | Cha Cha Cha | Tango | Jive | Slowfox | Waltz | Samba | Rumba | Paso Doble | Quickstep | Salsa | Bugg | Jive | Tango | | | |
| Molly & Jonathan | Waltz | Rumba | Quickstep | Paso Doble | Cha Cha Cha | Samba | Tango | Jive | Slowfox | Salsa | Bugg | | | | | |
| Stefan & Malin | Cha Cha Cha | Tango | Jive | Slowfox | Waltz | Samba | Rumba | Paso Doble | Quickstep | | | | | | | |
| Gudrun & Björn | Cha Cha Cha | Tango | Jive | Slowfox | Waltz | Samba | Rumba | Paso Doble | | | | | | | | |
| Elin & Daniel | Cha Cha Cha | Tango | Jive | Slowfox | Waltz | Samba | Rumba | | | | | | | | | |
| Marcus & Helena | Waltz | Rumba | Quickstep | Paso Doble | Cha Cha Cha | Samba | | | | | | | | | | |
| Rabih & Maria L. | Waltz | Rumba | Quickstep | Paso Doble | Cha Cha Cha | | | | | | | | | | | |
| Agneta & Tobias K. | Waltz | Rumba | Quickstep | Paso Doble | | | | | | | | | | | | |
| Peter & Maria B. | Waltz | Rumba | Quickstep | | | | | | | | | | | | | |
| Victoria & Anders | Waltz | Rumba | | | | | | | | | | | | | | |

Highest Scoring Dance
Lowest Scoring Dance
