= Alexander Hermansson (entertainer) =

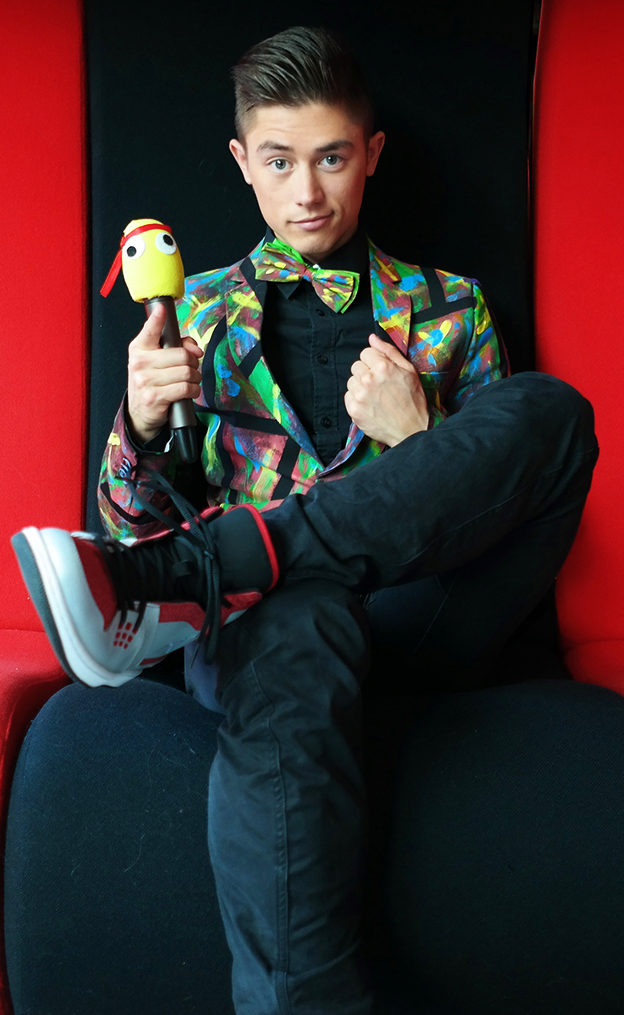
- Hermansson while presenting a show.
- Born: Alexander Ken Hermansson; 22 January 1992 (age 34); Huddinge, Sweden
- Occupation: Television presenter
- Parents: Jun Hermansson (father); Marianne Sörensson Hermansson (mother)

Alexander Ken Hermansson (born 22 January 1992) is a Swedish television presenter and social media influencer. Hermansson was a member of the extremesports and entertainment group Rackartygarna.

During the summer of 2014, he was the presenter of the children's summer show Sommarlov along with Malin Olsson and Rijal Mbamba which was broadcast on SVT.

After that appearance he has worked as a regular presenter for shows on Barnkanalen. In 2014, he participated in Talang 2014 along with Rackartygarna and placed second behind Jon Henrik Fjällgren. During early 2015, Hermansson participated as a celebrity dancer in Let's Dance 2015 on TV4. He placed fourth.

Hermansson is also active in the Christian church Hillsong Church.

Hermansson is of Japanese descent as his father was born in Japan.

== Presented shows ==
- 2013 - Rackartygarna, TV6-Play
- 2014 - Juniorprogramledare på OS i Sotji, Viasat
- 2014 - En skev resa, Splay/YouTube
- 2014 - Talang Sverige [second place], TV3
- 2014 - Sommarlov, SVT Barnkanalen
- 2014 - Fredagkväll med Alex, SVT Barnkanalen
- 2015 - Alex hittar hobbyn, SVT Barnkanalen
- 2015 - Lets Dance, TV4
