= Denise Rudberg =

Swedish author

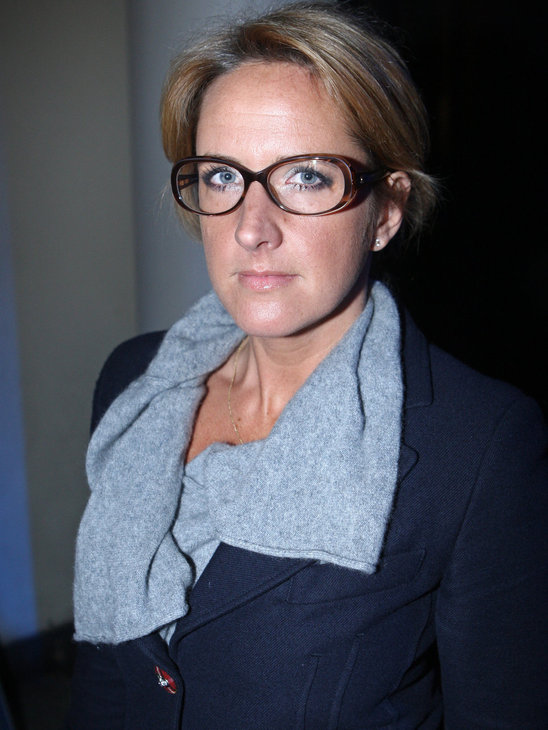
Denise Rudberg

Denise Rudberg (born 19 June 1971) is a Swedish author in chick lit and later in detective fiction.

Rudberg studied drama in New York City in the 1990s and has previously also worked as a nightclub hostess at the Riche club in Stockholm. Rudberg and her friend author Camilla Läckberg hosted the literature series Läckberg & Rudberg on SVT.

In 2010, Rudberg changed her book genre from chick lit to the detective fiction genre, which is set in an upper-class environment. This style she herself refers to as "Elegant crime".

== In popular culture ==
Rudberg was also a contestant on Let's Dance 2011 on TV4, where she was the first celebrity dancer to be eliminated.

== See also ==
- Cathy Kelly, another chick lit writer who appeared on a TV dance contest

== Bibliography (in selection) ==
- Väninnan (2000)
- Storlek 37 (2002)
- O.s.a. (2003)
- Jenny S (2005)
- Matilde (2006)
- Tillsammans (2007)
- Åse (2008)
- Tillsammans - andra boken (2008)
- Tillsammans - tredje boken (2009)
- Baristas (2010)
- Ett litet Snedsprång (2010)
