= Tilde de Paula Eby =

Chilean-born Swedish journalist, author and television presenter (born 1972)

Tilde de Paula
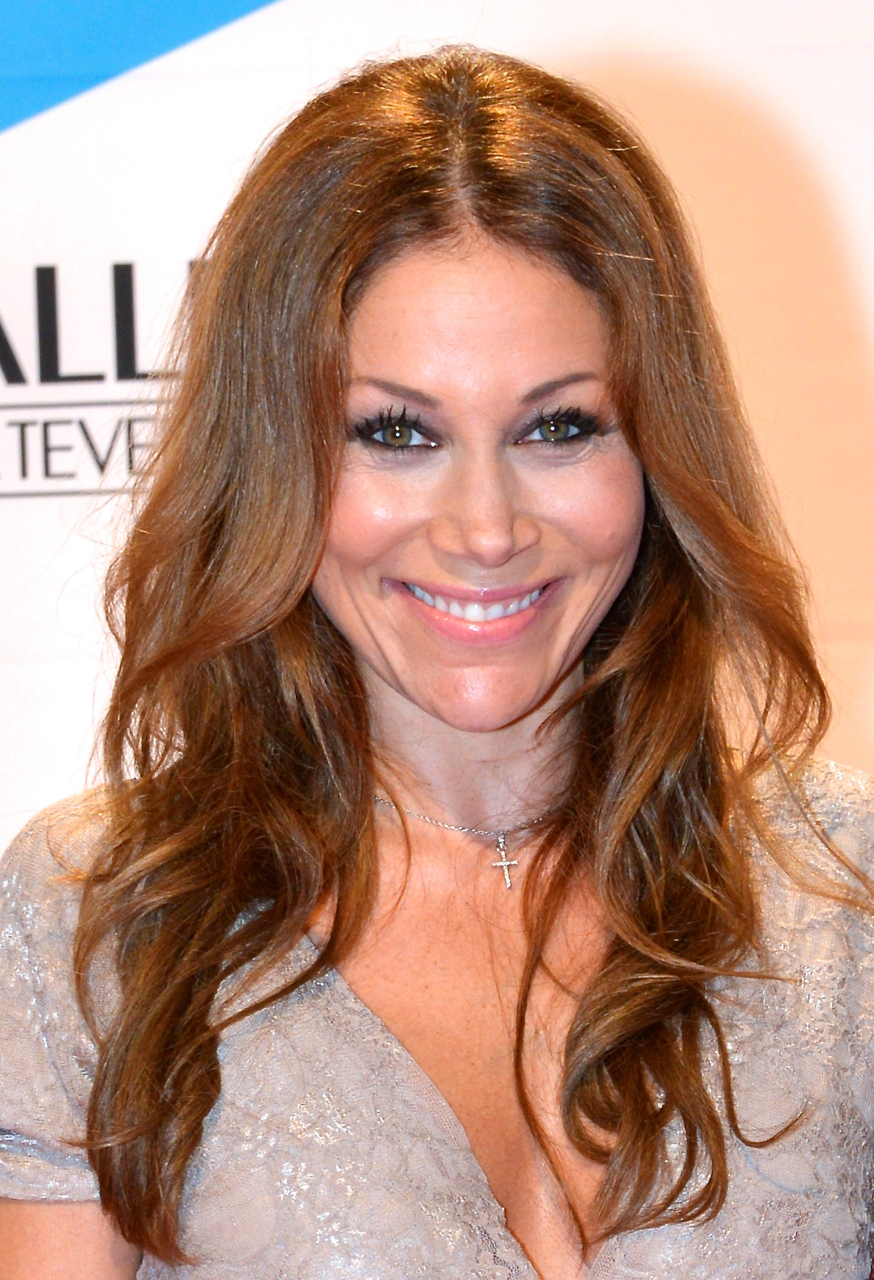
- De Paula in 2013
- Born: Anatilde Jane de Paula Díaz; 14 November 1972 (age 53); Chile
- Occupation: Television presenter
- Years active: 1996–present
- Spouse: Thomas Eby (m. 2012)
- Children: 4

Anatilde Jane "Tilde" de Paula Eby (née Anatilde Jane de Paula Díaz; 14 November 1972) is a Chilean-born Swedish journalist, author, television presenter and host of many of TV4s flagship programs. She has hosted many popular television shows such as the Nobel Prize, Polar Music Prize and live televised cancer fundraising events, and from 1997 until 2018 was one of the hosts of the popular Swedish breakfast programme Nyhetsmorgon.

== Early life ==
Anatilde Jane de Paula Díaz was born in 1972 in Chile. Her father was a Brazilian politician who had to flee Brazil after receiving death threats. In Cuba he met Tilde's mother and the two moved to Chile. However, after the military coup in 1973 they had to flee the country again, and with the help of the diplomat Harald Edelstam and the Swedish embassy, the family moved to Sweden. De Paula has an older brother, Andes.

Before she became a television presenter, de Paula studied journalism at Södra Vätterbygdens folkhögskola.

== Television ==
Since 2005, de Paula has been the host of the Polar Music Prize. She presented the election special Nyhetsmorgon – valflyget in September 2006 along with Lasse Bengtsson. In 2008 de Paula presented "Spårlöst" where she helped people to find their lost relatives and families. In 2009, she hosted Kändisdjungeln along with David Hellenius. In 2012, de Paula started hosting Nyhetsmorgon, Sweden's premier morning show on TV4. Since 2012, she has also been presenting the shows Swedish Bake Off, Swedish Bake Off Junior and Celebrity Swedish Bake Off. Since 2014, she has also presented the gala Tillsammans mot cancer. During Christmas Eve 2013, de Paula was the Christmas host for TV4's Christmas broadcasts. She also presented the celebrity dance show Let's Dance 2017. She continued to present Let's Dance 2018 and Let's Dance 2019

== Author ==
In 2006, Tilde de Paula co-authored the book Plastmammor, gummipappor och bonusbarn with Birgitta Klang published by Bokförlaget DN. Plastmammor, gummipappor och bonusbarn is a book for stepmothers and fathers who need advice on how to tackle the situation they are facing.

In 2015, de Paula wrote the Swedish best selling book Tiden läker inga sår, which tells the story of her past and how her ancestors have influenced her life. The story begins five generations back in Tenerife in 1867, and continues to Cuba, the United States and Chile before ending up in Sweden today.

== Other media ==
In the late 1990s and early 2000s, de Paula hosted the radio show Äntligen Fredag on the radio channel Mix Megapol.

In 2016, de Paula started hosting Läkarpodden where she, together with Dr Mikael Sandström, discuss the latest advances in medicine and healthcare, share their own experiences, kill myths and answer questions about anything related to medicine.

== Awards ==
In 2007, she won Aftonbladet's television award for Best Female Television Presenter of the Year.

She has also been announced as Sweden's best female television presenter by the paper Se & Hör. In 2015 she won the Kristallen award for Reality Show of the Year with the show Swedish Bake Off.

In 2016, de Paula won the Kristallen award for Best Swedish Female Host of the Year.

== Celebrity interviews ==
De Paula has interviewed a number of the Swedish royal family: King Carl XVI Gustaf, Queen Silvia, Crown Princess Victoria, Prince Carl Philip, Princess Sofia, Princess Christina and Prins Bertil.

De Paula has also interviewed a number of international stars including: Emmylou Harris, Paul Simon, Patti Smith, Justin Bieber, Regina Spektor, Noomi Rapace, Eleanor Coppola, Anastacia, Ennio Morricone, Björk, Peter Gabriel, Ronan Keating, Stellan Skarsgård and Alexander Skarsgård.

== Personal life ==
In November 2012, de Paula married musician Thomas Eby, lead vocalist of Calle Real and percussionist of Hoffmaestro. Together the couple has one son and she also has three children from previous relationships.
