= David Watson (dancer) =

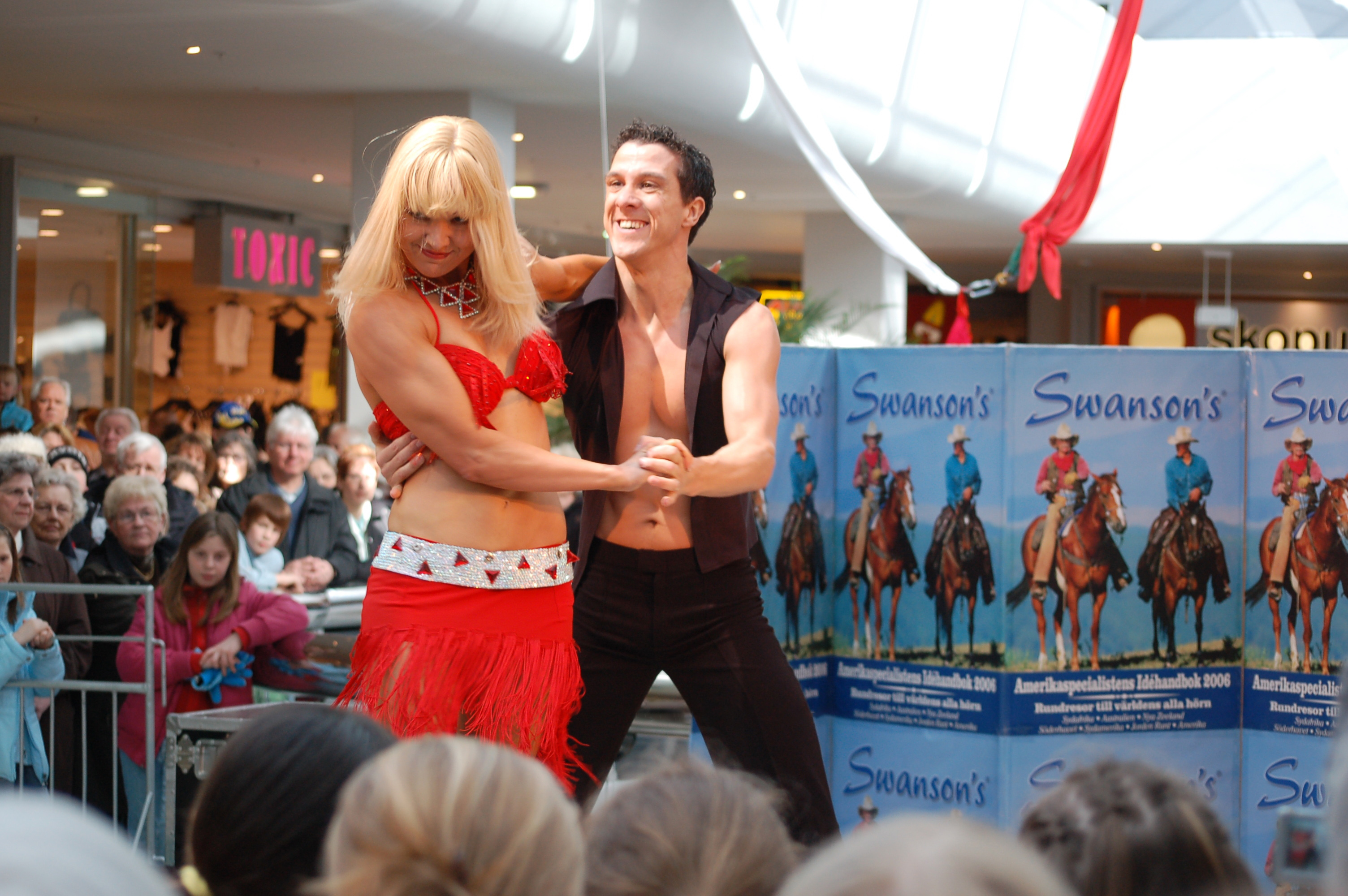
David Watson and his wife Malin (2006)

David Watson (born 1968) is a Swedish professional dancer that came into the spotlight in 2006 when he danced with singer Anna Book in the first season of Let's Dance. He returned to the seventh season of Let's Dance in 2012 and was partnered with singer Helena Paparizou.
