= Willy Björkman =

Swedish television personality

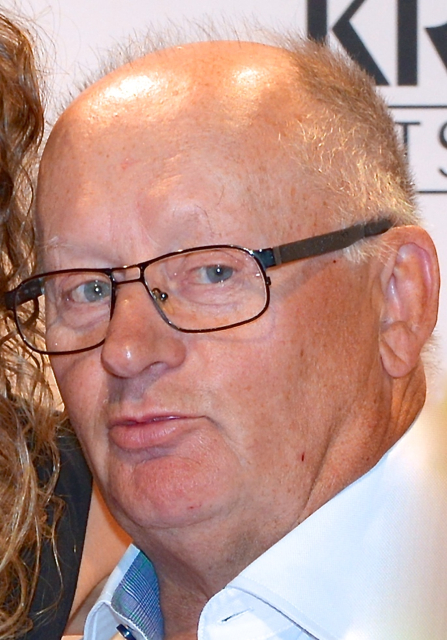
- Björkman in 2013
- Born: 4 August 1946 (age 78); Brännkyrka, Sweden

Willy Arne Björkman (born 4 August 1946) is a Swedish television personality mostly known for his participation in the home improvement show Bygglov on TV4. He participated as a celebrity dancer in Let's Dance where he placed third along with professional dancer Charlotte Sinclair.
