= Agneta Sjödin =

Swedish television personality (born 1967)

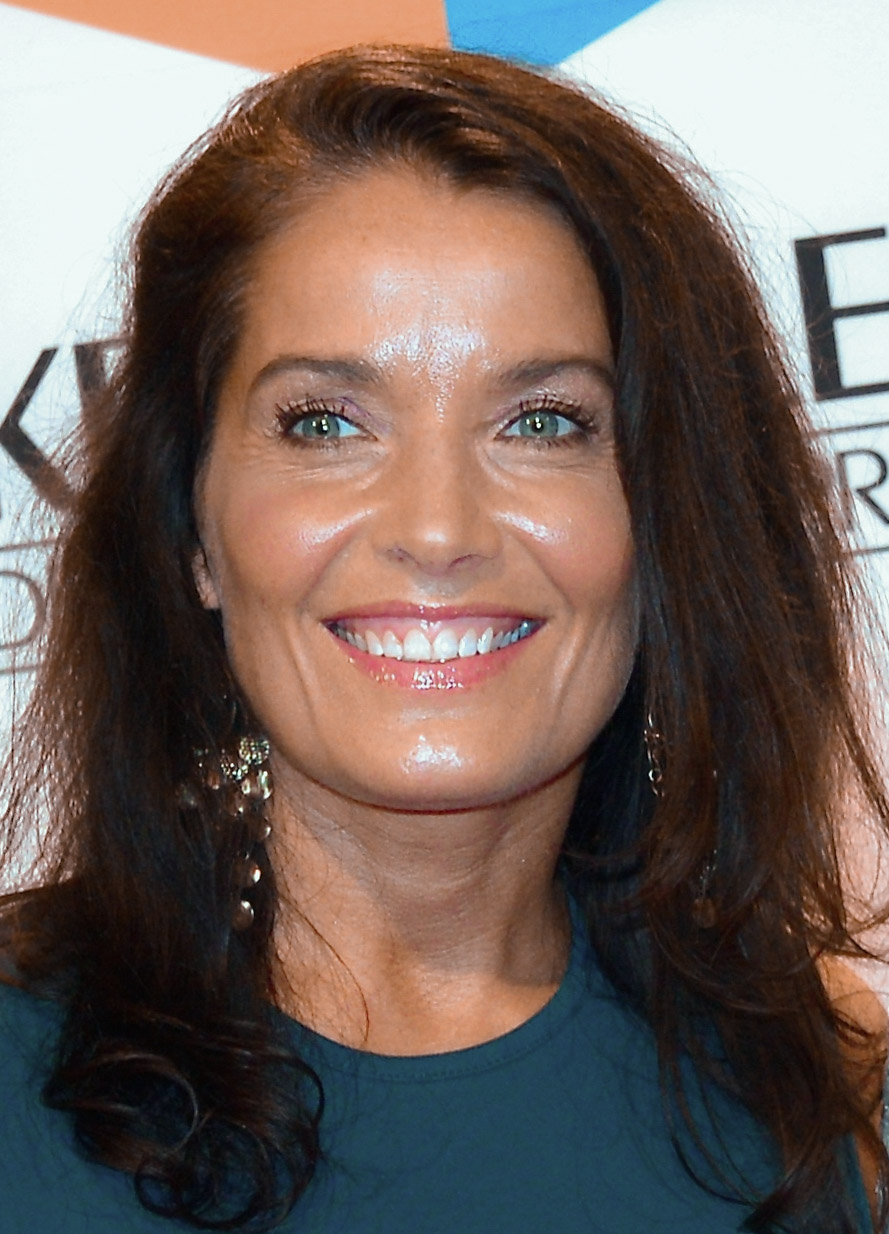
- Agneta Sjödin (2013)
- Born: 20 July 1967 (age 59); Hudiksvall, Sweden
- Occupations: Television host, Author
- Known for: Fångarna på fortet, Gladiatorerna, Let's Dance, Miss Sweden, Småstjärnorna

Agneta Sjödin (born 20 July 1967) is a Swedish television presenter and personality of the Swedish television channel TV4. She presented the first two seasons of the popular show Let's Dance with David Hellenius.

== Early life ==
She was born in a small town, 300 km north of Stockholm. As a child she was fond of handball, badminton and track-and-field athletics but most of all she was in love with theatre. She frequented a theatre group ”Slingerbultarna” with her friends and often performed in different local stage shows. Her passion to theatre resulted in moving to the capital of Sweden, but she returns to her native place at times, because she feels strong connection with her roots there.

In 1985, she studied theatre in Stockholm and worked in a cafe. In 1989-1991 she moved to Göteborg where she worked in lighting technology at Stadsteatern. In 1991 she debuted together with Adam Alsing as a co-presenter on TV in the first show of ”Tur i Kärlek”(Happy in love). In 1999, she gave birth to her daughter Maja. They have a close and hearty relationship.

== Television work ==
Sjödin started her career as a light technician; she was fixing lights at TV4 for television shows. Adam Alsing, a presenter for TV4, was looking for a female co-host for a new game show called Tur i kärlek. After auditioning several applicants, he asked Sjödin to audition, found her suitable and asked her to co-present the show with him. The show, which started broadcasting in 1992 and became a huge success, was the first game show on the channel.

Sjödin continued on television, co-presenting the travel game show Jakten på den försvunna diamanten with Bengt Magnusson which was broadcast on TV4, but did not receive good reviews and was cancelled soon after. She next co-hosted Fångarna på fortet with sport star Gunde Svan. The show was recorded at Fort Boyard in France, and Swedish celebrities performed different tasks in the fort's dungeons.

Between 1996 and 1999, she presented Små Stjärnorna and Sikta mot stjärnorna. In the following years she was the compère for Gladiatorerna—a Swedish version of The Gladiators. In her role on "Saknad" she reunited guests with lost relatives and parents they had not met for many years. Sjödin did not appear on TV4 for three years. Sjödin has twice presented the Miss Sweden beauty contest.

In late April 2015, Sjödin was involved in a bicycle accident on Djurgården in Stockholm and had to have hip surgery.

== Other projects ==
Agneta Sjödin pursued a singing career and appeared on the show "Allsång på Skansen" broadcast on SVT. She was asked to sing in Melodifestivalen, which she declined. In early 2006, TV4 realised that Sjödin was about to leave the channel, so they offered her the host job along David Hellenius on the hit show Let's Dance—the Swedish version of Strictly Come Dancing, which as of 2013 has been aired for two seasons.

== Shows ==
- Tur i kärlek
- Fångarna på fortet
- Småstjärnorna
- Sikta mot stjärnorna
- Jakten på den röda rubinen
- Saknad
- Let's Dance
- Gladiatorerna
- Miss Sweden
- Över Atlanten (2019)
