= Kristin Kaspersen =

Swedish-Norwegian television host (born 1969)

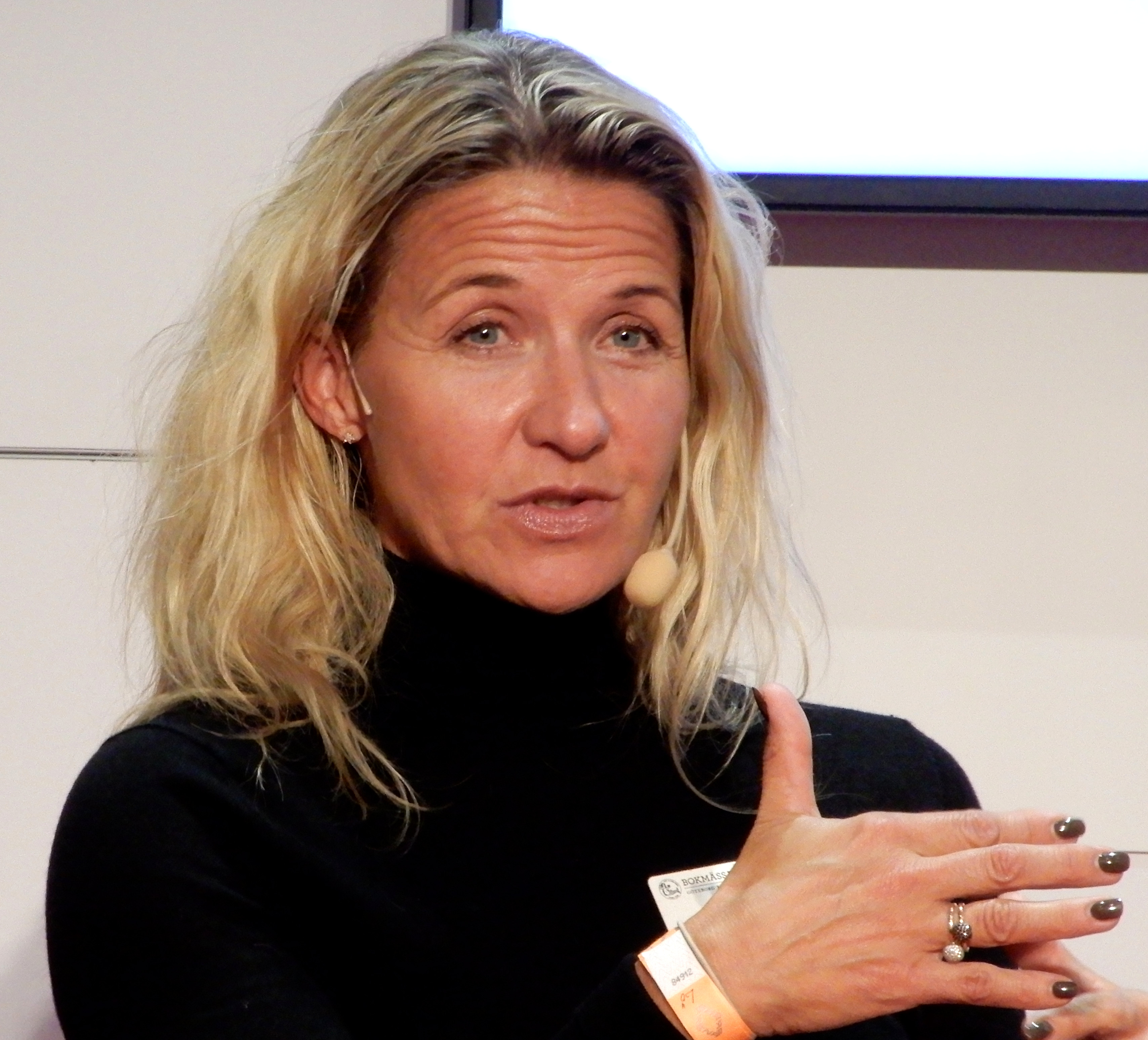
- Kaspersen in 2022
- Born: 30 September 1969 (age 56); Oslo, Norway
- Occupation: Television host
- Years active: 1990–present
- Children: 2

Kristin Kaspersen (born 30 September 1969) is a Swedish-Norwegian television host who is working for the Swedish media company TV4 Group, which is the owner of the television channel TV4. She is the daughter of Lill-Babs and Kjell Kaspersen and was raised in Stockholm. Kaspersen began her television career in the early 1990s after completing an internship on one of Robert Aschberg's programs. She has hosted many popular television shows since then, and is "one of Sweden's famous television faces" according to a 2009 article in Sydsvenskan. Kaspersen is one of the hosts of Nyhetsmorgon on TV4.

== Early life ==
Kaspersen was born in Oslo, Norway, and is the daughter of Swedish singer and actress Lill-Babs and Norwegian football goalkeeper Kjell Kaspersen. She grew up in Stockholm with her mother, but often visited her father in Oslo during her free time. Kaspersen made her first acting performance when she was eleven years old. She appeared in the musical Pippi Långstrump (based on Pippi Longstocking) at the theater Folkan in Stockholm alongside her older sister Malin Berghagen. Several more appearances in musicals followed in the next few years. In 1988, Kaspersen graduated from a gymnasium in Ljusdal. She worked as a bartender and a waitress in Stockholm and Oslo after her school years, as well as a flight attendant.

== Television career ==
Between 1990 and 1991, Kaspersen was an intern at Robert Aschberg's television show Ikväll (aired on TV3). This led to a career in television, and she soon got a job as a weather girl on TV3 in Norway. Her debut as a television host came in 1992 with the Swedish show Station Åre (aired on ZTV), which she appeared on until 1993. In 1993, she hosted Sommar på Gröna Lund on TV4. As a result, she was awarded the "Lennart Hyland-prize" for "Sweden's most popular TV-personality" (becoming the youngest person to ever receive that award).

In the late 1990s, Kaspersen hosted the entertainment show Söndagsöppet alongside Ulf Larsson. On this program she interviewed famous celebrities such as Cher and Tom Jones. In 2002, Kaspersen hosted Melodifestivalen (aired on SVT), and in 2003 and 2005, she hosted Fortet (TV4), a Swedish version of Fort Boyard. Since 2007, Kaspersen has been one of the hosts of TV4's Nyhetsmorgon, the largest morning show in Sweden. She also hosted TV4's coverage of the 2010 wedding between Victoria, Crown Princess of Sweden, and Daniel Westling.

Kaspersen is also a columnist for the Swedish lifestyle magazine Family Living.

She was the winner of Let's Dance 2019, which was broadcast on TV4

== Personal life ==
In 2000, Kaspersen separated from her boyfriend Martin Lamprecht, whom she had been living in cohabitation with for five years. They had a son named Filip together. Kaspersen married Hans Fahlén, also a Swedish television host, in April 2003. They met when they hosted Station Åre together in 1993, and remained good friends until 2002 when they began a relationship. They hosted Fortet together in 2003 and 2005. Ten months after their wedding, in February 2004, they had a son together named Leon. Kaspersen and Fahlén decided to file for divorce in early 2008, although they are still good friends.

As of 2010, Kaspersen is living in Sollentuna, outside Stockholm. In her spare time she enjoys photography, golf, exercise, and yoga. In addition to Malin Berghagen, Kaspersen has one sister and two brothers.
