= Let's Dance 2011 =

- Season 2011
- Celebrity winner: Jessica Andersson
- Professional winner: Kristjan Lootus

Release
- Original network: TV4
- Original release: 7 January – 25 March 2011

Season chronology
- ← Previous; Let's Dance 2010 Next → Let's Dance 2012

Let's Dance 2011 is the sixth season of the Swedish version of the celebrity dance show Strictly Come Dancing, and was broadcast on the Swedish free-to-air television network channel TV4 starting on 7 January 2011. Singer Jessica Andersson won.

== Couples ==
Celebrity	Occupation	Professional partner	Status
Denise Rudberg	Author	Tobias Wallin	Eliminated 1st on 14 January 2011
Hannah Graaf	Singer & Model	Calle Sterner	Eliminated 2nd on 21 January 2011
Anders Bagge	Record Producer	Cecilia Ehrling	Eliminated 3rd on 28 January 2011
Björn Ranelid	Author	Maria Lindberg	Eliminated 4th on 4 February 2011
Andreas Weise	Singer	Sigrid Bernson	Eliminated 5th on 11 February 2011
Helena Lundbäck	Show Jumper	Jonathan Näslund	Eliminated 6th on 18 February 2011
Alexandra Pascalidou	Journalist	Ludwig Jerkander	Eliminated 7th on 25 February 2011
Figge Norling	Actor	Oksana Spichak	Eliminated 8th on 4 March 2011
Alexander Rybak	Eurovision 2009 Winner	Malin Johansson	Eliminated 9th on 11 March 2011
Tina Thörner	Rally Driver	Tobias Karlsson	Eliminated 10th on 18 March 2011
Frank Andersson	Wrestler	Charlotte Sinclair	Second Place on 25 March 2011
Jessica Andersson	Singer	Kristjan Lootus	Winners on 25 March 2011

== Scoring chart ==
Couple	Place	1^{[1]}	2	1+2	3	4	5	6	7	8	9	10	11	12
Jessica & Kristjan	1	12	10	22	18	24	23	20	18	31+9=40	37	28+39=67	34+37=71	36+38+40=114
Frank & Charlotte	2	11	20	31	20	21	32	30	30	31+5=36	34	32+38=70	38+40=78	33+40+39=112
Tina & Tobias K.	3	17	12	29	14	27	32	34	29	26+8=34	24	33+28=61	31+31=62	
Alexander & Malin	4	20	14	34	15	19	21	24	18	25+10=35	36	19+29=48		
Figge & Oksana	5	17	19	36	27	18	30	37	23	37+6=43	26			
Alexandra & Ludwig	6	8	11	19	16	19	28	34	13	26+7=33				
Helena & Jonathan	7	14	12	26	23	14	23	19	24					
Andreas & Sigrid	8	14	7	21	8	20	21	25						
Björn & Maria	9	9	6	15	12	11	10							
Anders & Cecilia	10	9	12	21	18	15								
Hannah & Calle	11	5	18	23	15									
Denise & Tobias W.	12	13	14	27										

Red numbers indicate the lowest score for each week.
Green numbers indicate the highest score for each week.
indicates the couple eliminated that week.
indicates the returning couple that finished in the bottom two.
indicates the winning couple.
indicates the runner-up couple.
indicates the third place couple.

- ^1 The first week did not eliminate any couple, instead it was announced who was in the bottom two going into Week 2.
- ^2 Since Week 1 was a non-elimination week, Week 2 featured a combined score of both Week 1 and 2, which was used in the final standings.
- ^3 Ann Wilson was unavailable to judge the show, so scores were out of 30 points.

== Average chart ==
Rank by average	Place	Couple	Total	Number of dances	Average
1	2	Frank & Charlotte	499	16	31.2
2	1	Jessica & Kristjan	451	16	28.2
3	5	Figge & Oksana	241.7	9	26.9
4	3	Tina & Tobias K.	347.7	13	26.7
5	4	Alexander & Malin	246	11	22.4
6	6	Alexandra & Ludwig	159.3	8	19.9
7	7	Helena & Jonathan	137	7	19.6
8	8	Andreas & Sigrid	95	6	15.8
9	10	Anders & Cecilia	54	4	13.5
9	12	Denise & Tobias W.	27	2	13.5
11	11	Hannah & Calle	38	3	12.7
12	9	Björn & Maria	48	5	9.6

=== Average dance chart ===
Couples	Averages	Best Dance(s)	Worst Dance(s)
Jessica & Kristjan	28.2	Showdance (40)	Rumba (10)
Frank & Charlotte	31.2	Rumba & Waltz (40)	Cha-Cha-Cha (11)
Tina & Tobias K.	26.7	Rumba (39)	Quickstep (12)
Alexander & Malin	22.4	Slowfox (36)	Rumba (14)
Figge & Oksana	26.9	Waltz & Tango (37)	Cha-Cha-Cha (17)
Alexandra & Ludwig	19.9	Waltz (34)	Cha-Cha-Cha (8)
Helena & Jonathan	19.6	Quickstep (32)	Rumba (12)
Andreas & Sigrid	15.8	Waltz (25)	Quickstep (7)
Björn & Maria	9.6	Tango (12)	Rumba (6)
Anders & Cecilia	13.5	Tango (18)	Waltz (9)
Hannah & Calle	12.7	Quickstep (18)	Cha-Cha-Cha (5)
Denise & Tobias W.	13.5	Rumba (14)	Waltz (13)

== Highest and lowest scoring performances ==
The best and worst performances in each dance according to the judges' marks are as follows:

Dance	Best dancer(s)	Best score	Worst dancer(s)	Worst score
Cha Cha Cha	Frank Andersson	38	Hannah Graaf	5
Waltz	Frank Andersson	40	Anders Bagge; Björn Ranelid	9
Rumba	Frank Andersson	40	Björn Ranelid	6
Quickstep	Helena Lundbäck	32	Andreas Weise	7
Jive	Jessica Andersson	37	Andreas Weise	8
Tango	Figge Norling	37	Björn Ranelid	12
Paso Doble	Frank Andersson	34	Björn Ranelid	11
Slowfox	Jessica Andersson	37	Figge Norling	18
Samba	Frank Andersson	33	Björn Ranelid	10
Rock 'n' Roll	Alexander Rybak	10	Frank Andersson	5
Salsa	Frank Andersson	38	Alexander Rybak	19
Bugg	Jessica Andersson	39	Tina Thörner	28
Showdance	Jessica Andersson	40	Frank Andersson	39

=== Dance schedule ===
The celebrities and professional partners danced one of these routines for each corresponding week.

- Week 1: Cha-Cha-Cha or Waltz
- Week 2: Rumba or Quickstep
- Week 3: Jive or Tango
- Week 4: Paso Doble or Slowfox
- Week 5: Samba
- Week 6: Cha-Cha-Cha or Waltz
- Week 7: Rumba or Quickstep
- Week 8: Jive or Tango and Rock 'n' Roll Marathon
- Week 9: Paso Doble or Slowfox and Bonus Dance
- Week 10: Salsa and Bugg

== Songs ==
=== Week 1 ===
Individual judges scores in charts below (given in parentheses) are listed in this order from left to right: Dermot Clemenger, Isabel Edvardsson, Ann Wilson and Tony Irving.

Running order

Couple	Score	Style	Music
Frank & Charlotte	11 (3,3,3,2)	Cha-Cha-Cha	"Forget You" – Cee Lo Green
Alexandra & Ludwig	8 (2,2,2,2)	Cha-Cha-Cha	"Lovefool" – The Cardigans
Jessica & Kristjan	12 (3,3,3,3)	Waltz	"Everybody Hurts" – R.E.M.
Figge & Oksana	17 (5,4,4,4)	Cha-Cha-Cha	"Ambitions" – Donkeyboy
Anders & Cecilia	9 (3,2,3,1)	Waltz	"Heroes" – David Bowie
Hannah & Calle	5 (1,1,2,1)	Cha-Cha-Cha	"Dancing on My Own" – Robyn
Alexander & Malin	20 (5,5,5,5)	Waltz	"Purple Rain" – Prince
Tina & Tobias K.	17 (4,4,4,5)	Cha-Cha-Cha	"Black or White" – Michael Jackson
Denise & Tobias W.	13 (3,4,3,3)	Waltz	"Keep on Walking" – Salem Al Fakir
Andreas & Sigrid	14 (4,3,3,4)	Cha-Cha-Cha	"Break Your Heart" – Taio Cruz
Helena & Jonathan	14 (3,4,4,3)	Waltz	"Om du lämnade mig nu" – Lars Winnerbäck feat. Miss Li
Björn & Maria	9 (2,2,2,3)	Waltz	"Hallelujah" – Leonard Cohen

=== Week 2 ===
Individual judges scores in charts below (given in parentheses) are listed in this order from left to right: Dermot Clemenger, Isabel Edvardsson, Ann Wilson and Tony Irving.

Running order

Couple	Score	Style	Music
Anders & Cecilia	12 (3,3,4,2)	Rumba	"With or Without You" – U2
Andreas & Sigrid	7 (2,2,2,1)	Quickstep	"We No Speak Americano" – Yolanda Be Cool & DCUP
Helena & Jonathan	12 (3,3,3,3)	Rumba	"Desperado" – Eagles
Hannah & Calle	18 (4,4,5,5)	Quickstep	"Monday Morning" – Melanie Fiona
Jessica & Kristjan	10 (3,2,3,2)	Rumba	"Angels" – Robbie Williams
Figge & Oksana	19 (5,4,5,5)	Quickstep	"Satellite" – Lena
Björn & Maria	6 (1,1,2,2)	Rumba	"Ängeln i rummet" – Eva Dahlgren
Frank & Charlotte	20 (5,4,5,6)	Quickstep	"Could You Be Loved" – Bob Marley
Denise & Tobias W.	14 (4,3,3,4)	Rumba	"Empire State of Mind" – Jay-Z feat. Alicia Keys
Alexander & Malin	14 (4,3,4,3)	Rumba	"Utan dina andetag" – Kent
Alexandra & Ludwig	11 (3,3,3,2)	Quickstep	"Hey, Soul Sister" – Train
Tina & Tobias K.	12 (3,3,3,3)	Quickstep	"Oh Boy" – Miss Li

=== Week 3 ===
Individual judges scores in charts below (given in parentheses) are listed in this order from left to right: Dermot Clemenger, Isabel Edvardsson, Ann Wilson and Tony Irving.

Running order

Couple	Score	Style	Music
Alexander & Malin	15 (4,4,4,3)	Tango	"Stereo Love" – Edward Maya & Vika Jigulina
Tina & Tobias K.	14 (4,3,4,3)	Jive	"Candyman" – Christina Aguilera
Helena & Jonathan	23 (6,6,6,5)	Tango	"Jealousy" – Billy Fury
Andreas & Sigrid	8 (2,2,3,1)	Jive	"Such a Night" – Elvis Presley
Hannah & Calle	15 (4,4,3,4)	Jive	"Kids in America" – Kim Wilde
Björn & Maria	12 (3,3,3,3)	Tango	"Alors on danse" – Stromae
Frank & Charlotte	20 (4,5,5,6)	Jive	"Bad Boys" – Alexandra Burke
Jessica & Kristjan	18 (5,4,5,4)	Tango	"Natteravn" – Rasmus Seebach
Figge & Oksana	27 (7,6,7,7)	Jive	"Cobrastyle" – Teddybears
Alexandra & Ludwig	16 (4,4,4,4)	Jive	"Manboy" – Eric Saade
Anders & Cecilia	18 (5,4,4,5)	Tango	"Memories" – David Guetta feat. Kid Cudi

=== Week 4 ===
Individual judges scores in charts below (given in parentheses) are listed in this order from left to right: Dermot Clemenger, Isabel Edvardsson, Ann Wilson and Tony Irving.

Running order

Couple	Score	Style	Music
Björn & Maria	11 (3,3,3,2)	Paso Doble	"Misirlou" – Pulp Fiction
Frank & Charlotte	21 (5,5,5,6)	Slowfox	"Mack the Knife" – Louis Armstrong
Alexandra & Ludwig	19 (5,4,5,5)	Slowfox	"Nothin' on You" – B.o.B feat. Bruno Mars
Figge & Oksana	18 (4,5,4,5)	Slowfox	"Sträck ut din hand" – Lasse Berghagen
Jessica & Kristjan	24 (6,6,6,6)	Paso Doble	"Främling" – Carola
Anders & Cecilia	15 (4,4,4,3)	Paso Doble	"Gloria" – Mando Diao
Tina & Tobias K.	27 (7,7,6,7)	Slowfox	"Every Breath You Take" – The Police
Helena & Jonathan	14 (4,4,3,3)	Paso Doble	"Från och med du" – Oskar Linnros
Andreas & Sigrid	20 (5,5,5,5)	Slowfox	"I'm Yours" – Jason Mraz
Alexander & Malin	19 (5,4,6,4)	Paso Doble	"Commander" – Kelly Rowland

=== Week 5 ===
Individual judges scores in charts below (given in parentheses) are listed in this order from left to right: Dermot Clemenger, Isabel Edvardsson, Ann Wilson and Tony Irving.

Running order

Couple	Score	Style	Music
Figge & Oksana	30 (8,8,7,7)	Samba	"I Like to Move It" – Reel 2 Real
Helena & Jonathan	23 (6,6,6,5)	Samba	"Bumpy Ride" – Mohombi
Alexander & Malin	21 (6,5,6,4)	Samba	"Million Pieces" – Tove Styrke
Alexandra & Ludwig	28 (7,7,7,7)	Samba	"Sarah" – Mauro Scocco
Jessica & Kristjan	23 (6,5,5,7)	Samba	"Destination Calabria" – Alex Gaudino
Andreas & Sigrid	21 (6,5,6,4)	Samba	"Shame, Shame, Shame" – Shirley & Company
Björn & Maria	10 (3,2,3,2)	Samba	"María" – Ricky Martin
Tina & Tobias K.	32 (8,8,8,8)	Samba	"I samma bil" – Bo Kaspers Orkester
Frank & Charlotte	32 (8,7,8,9)	Samba	"A Little Less Conversation" – Elvis Presley

=== Week 6 ===
Individual judges scores in charts below (given in parentheses) are listed in this order from left to right: Dermot Clemenger, Isabel Edvardsson, Ann Wilson and Tony Irving.

Running order

Couple	Score	Style	Music
Jessica & Kristjan	20 (6,5,5,4)	Cha-Cha-Cha	"Lady Marmalade" – from Moulin Rouge!
Andreas & Sigrid	25 (7,7,6,5)	Waltz	"Jönssonligan temat" – from Jönssonligan
Helena & Jonathan	19 (5,5,5,4)	Cha-Cha-Cha	"Oh, Pretty Woman" – from Pretty Woman
Figge & Oksana	37 (10,9,9,9)	Waltz	"Cavatina" – from The Deer Hunter
Alexander & Malin	24 (6,6,6,6)	Cha-Cha-Cha	"Axel F" – from Beverly Hills Cop
Tina & Tobias K.	34 (9,8,8,9)	Waltz	"Edelweiss" – from The Sound of Music
Frank & Charlotte	30 (8,8,7,7)	Waltz	"Fairytale" – from Shrek
Alexandra & Ludwig	34 (9,8,8,9)	Waltz	"A Time for Us" – from Romeo and Juliet

=== Week 7 ===
Individual judges scores in charts below (given in parentheses) are listed in this order from left to right: Dermot Clemenger, Isabel Edvardsson, and Tony Irving.

Ann Wilson was unavailable to judge the show, so scores were out of 30 points.

Running order

Couple	Score	Style	Music
Alexandra & Ludwig	13 (5,5,3)	Rumba	"Magaluf" – Orup
Frank & Charlotte	30 (10,10,10)	Rumba	"Från Djursholm Till Danvikstull" – Orup
Jessica & Kristjan	18 (6,6,6)	Quickstep	"Jag Blir Hellre Jagad Av Vargar" – Orup
Helena & Jonathan	24 (8,7,9)	Quickstep	"Sjung Halleluja" – Orup
Tina & Tobias K.	29 (9,10,10)	Rumba	"Stockholm" – Orup
Alexander & Malin	18 (7,6,5)	Quickstep	"M.B." – Orup
Figge & Oksana	23 (8,8,7)	Rumba	"Regn Hos Mej" – Orup

=== Week 8 ===
Individual judges scores in charts below (given in parentheses) are listed in this order from left to right: Dermot Clemenger, Isabel Edvardsson, Ann Wilson and Tony Irving.

Running order

Couple	Score	Style	Music
Tina & Tobias K.	26 (7,7,6,6)	Tango	"Only Girl (In The World)" – Rihanna
Figge & Oksana	37 (9,10,9,9)	Tango	"Voyage, Voyage" – Desireless
Jessica & Kristjan	31 (8,7,8,8)	Jive	"Single Ladies" – Beyoncé
Alexandra & Ludwig	26 (7,6,6,7)	Tango	"SexyBack" – Justin Timberlake
Alexander & Malin	25 (7,6,7,5)	Jive	"Wake Me Up Before You Go-Go" – Wham!
Frank & Charlotte	31 (8,8,9,6)	Tango	"Purple Haze" – Jimi Hendrix
Alexander & Malin; Jessica & Kristjan; Tina & Tobias K. Alexandra & Ludwig; Figge & Oksana; Frank & Charlotte	10; 9; 8; 7; 6; 5	Rock 'n' Roll	"Great Balls of Fire" – Jerry Lee Lewis

=== Week 9 ===
Individual judges scores in charts below (given in parentheses) are listed in this order from left to right: Dermot Clemenger, Isabel Edvardsson, Ann Wilson and Tony Irving.

Running order

Couple	Score	Style	Music
Figge & Oksana	26 (7,7,6,6)	Paso Doble	"The Final Countdown" – Europe
Figge & Oksana	(Bonus Dance)	Hip Hop	"Gold Digger" – Kanye West & Jamie Foxx
Alexander & Malin	36 (9,9,9,9)	Slowfox	"Baby Love" – The Supremes
Alexander & Malin	(Bonus Dance)	Charleston	"The Charleston" – Harry Strutters
Tina & Tobias K.	24 (6,7,6,5)	Paso Doble	"Holding Out for a Hero" – Bonnie Tyler
Tina & Tobias K.	(Bonus Dance)	Disco	"Knock on Wood" – Amii Stewart
Jessica & Kristjan	37 (9,9,9,10)	Slowfox	"Pack Up" – Eliza Doolittle
Jessica & Kristjan	(Bonus Dance)	Bollywood	"Jhoom Barabar Jhoom" – Shankar Mahadevan & Sunidhi Chauhan
Frank & Charlotte	34 (8,9,9,8)	Paso Doble	"Pride (In the Name of Love)" – U2
Frank & Charlotte	(Bonus Dance)	Bachata	"Corazon Sin Cara" – Prince Royce

=== Week 10 ===
Individual judges scores in charts below (given in parentheses) are listed in this order from left to right: Dermot Clemenger, Isabel Edvardsson, Ann Wilson and Tony Irving.

Running order

Couple	Score	Style	Music
Frank & Charlotte	32 (8,9,8,7)	Bugg	"Waterloo" – ABBA
Frank & Charlotte	38 (9,9,10,10)	Salsa	"Knowing Me, Knowing You" – ABBA
Alexander & Malin	19 (5,5,5,4)	Salsa	"Chiquitita" – ABBA
Alexander & Malin	29 (8,8,7,6)	Bugg	"When I Kissed the Teacher" – ABBA
Tina & Tobias K.	33 (9,8,8,8)	Bugg	"Mamma Mia" – ABBA
Tina & Tobias K.	28 (7,7,8,6)	Salsa	"Hasta Mañana" – ABBA
Jessica & Kristjan	28 (8,6,6,8)	Salsa	"Dancing Queen" – ABBA
Jessica & Kristjan	39 (10,9,10,10)	Bugg	"Honey, Honey" – ABBA

=== Week 11 ===
Individual judges scores in charts below (given in parentheses) are listed in this order from left to right: Dermot Clemenger, Isabel Edvardsson, Ann Wilson and Tony Irving.

Running order

Couple	Score	Style	Music
Tina & Tobias K.	31 (8,8,8,7)	Quickstep	"Oh Boy" – Miss Li
Tina & Tobias K.	31 (8,7,8,8)	Samba	"I samma bil" – Bo Kaspers Orkester
Frank & Charlotte	38 (9,10,9,10)	Cha-Cha-Cha	"Forget You" – Cee Lo Green
Frank & Charlotte	40 (10,10,10,10)	Rumba	"Från Djursholm Till Danvikstull" – Orup
Jessica & Kristjan	34 (9,8,8,9)	Rumba	"Angels" – Robbie Williams
Jessica & Kristjan	37 (9,9,9,10)	Jive	"Single Ladies" – Beyoncé

=== Week 12 ===
Individual judges scores in charts below (given in parentheses) are listed in this order from left to right: Dermot Clemenger, Isabel Edvardsson, Ann Wilson and Tony Irving.

Running order

Couple	Score	Style	Music
Frank & Charlotte	33 (8,9,8,8)	Samba	"A Little Less Conversation" – Elvis Presley
Frank & Charlotte	40 (10,10,10,10)	Waltz	"Fairytale" – from Shrek
Frank & Charlotte	39 (10,10,10,9)	Showdance	"Don't Stop Me Now" – Queen
Jessica & Kristjan	36 (9,9,9,9)	Slowfox	"Pack Up" – Eliza Doolittle
Jessica & Kristjan	38 (10,9,9,10)	Bugg	"Honey, Honey" – ABBA
Jessica & Kristjan	40 (10,10,10,10)	Showdance	"Hush Hush (I Will Survive)" – The Pussycat Dolls

== Call-out order ==
The table below lists the order in which the contestants' fates were revealed. The order of the safe couples does not reflect the viewer voting results.

Order	2	3	4	5	6	7	8	9	10	11	12
1	Figge & Oksana	Figge & Oksana			Alexandra & Ludwig			Jessica & Kristjan	Jessica & Kristjan	Frank & Charlotte	Jessica & Kristjan
2	Alexander & Malin		Frank & Charlotte		Figge & Oksana			Alexander & Malin	Tina & Tobias K.	Jessica & Kristjan	Frank & Charlotte
3	Jessica & Kristjan				Frank & Charlotte			Tina & Tobias K.	Frank & Charlotte	Tina & Tobias K.	
4	Frank & Charlotte		Helena & Jonathan	Andreas & Sigrid	Tina & Tobias K.			Frank & Charlotte	Alexander & Malin		
5	Helena & Jonathan			Alexandra & Ludwig	Helena & Jonathan	Alexandra & Ludwig	Figge & Oksana	Figge & Oksana			
6	Andreas & Sigrid		Andreas & Sigrid		Alexander & Malin	Jessica & Kristjan	Alexandra & Ludwig				
7	Bjorn & Maria	Alexander & Malin		Jessica & Kristjan	Jessica & Kristjan	Helena & Jonathan					
8	Tina & Tobias K.		Bjorn & Maria	Helena & Jonathan	Andreas & Sigrid						
9	Anders & Cecilia	Andreas & Sigrid	Alexandra & Ludwig	Björn & Maria							
10	Hannah & Calle	Alexandra & Ludwig	Anders & Cecilia								
11	Alexandra & Ludwig	Hannah & Calle									
12	Denise & Tobias W.										

This couple came in first place with the judges.
This couple came in last place with the judges.
This couple came in last place with the judges and was eliminated.
This couple was eliminated.
This couple won the competition.
This couple came in second in the competition.

== Dance chart ==
Couple	1	2	3	4	5	6	7	8		9		10		11		12		
Jessica & Kristjan	Waltz	Rumba	Tango	Paso Doble	Samba	Cha-Cha-Cha	Quickstep	Jive	Rock 'n' Roll	Slowfox	Bollywood	Salsa	Bugg	Rumba	Jive	Slowfox	Bugg	Showdance
Frank & Charlotte	Cha-Cha-Cha	Quickstep	Jive	Slowfox	Samba	Waltz	Rumba	Tango	Rock 'n' Roll	Paso Doble	Bachata	Bugg	Salsa	Cha-Cha-Cha	Rumba	Samba	Waltz	Showdance
Tina & Tobias K.	Cha-Cha-Cha	Quickstep	Jive	Slowfox	Samba	Waltz	Rumba	Tango	Rock 'n' Roll	Paso Doble	Disco	Bugg	Salsa	Quickstep	Samba			Bugg
Alexander & Malin	Waltz	Rumba	Tango	Paso Doble	Samba	Cha-Cha-Cha	Quickstep	Jive	Rock 'n' Roll	Slowfox	Charleston	Salsa	Bugg					Charleston
Figge & Oksana	Cha-Cha-Cha	Quickstep	Jive	Slowfox	Samba	Waltz	Rumba	Tango	Rock 'n' Roll	Paso Doble	Hip Hop							Waltz
Alexandra & Ludwig	Cha-Cha-Cha	Quickstep	Jive	Slowfox	Samba	Waltz	Rumba	Tango	Rock 'n' Roll									Samba
Helena & Jonathan	Waltz	Rumba	Tango	Paso Doble	Samba	Cha-Cha-Cha	Quickstep											Tango
Andreas & Sigrid	Cha-Cha-Cha	Quickstep	Jive	Slowfox	Samba	Waltz												Slowfox
Björn & Maria	Waltz	Rumba	Tango	Paso Doble	Samba													Tango
Anders & Cecilia	Waltz	Rumba	Tango	Paso Doble														Paso Doble
Hannah & Calle	Cha-Cha-Cha	Quickstep	Jive															Quickstep
Denise & Tobias W.	Waltz	Rumba																Rumba

Highest Scoring Dance
Lowest Scoring Dance
Dances performed at the finale by previously eliminated celebrities
