= Tony Irving =

British-Swedish TV-personality, radiopresenter and entertainer

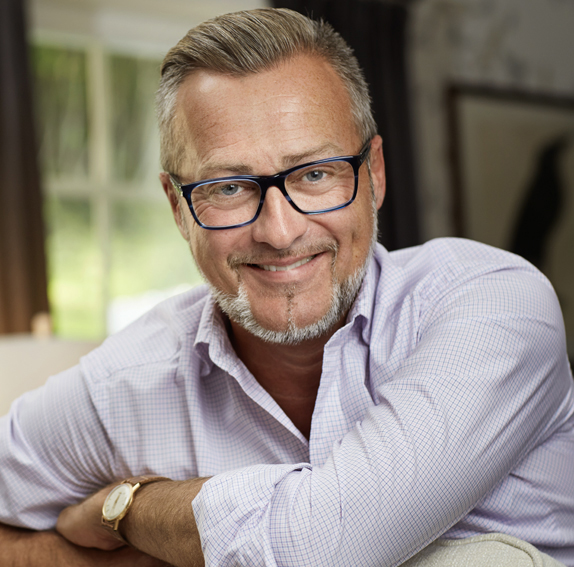
- Born: July 5, 1966 (age 60); Ainsworth, Greater Manchester, England
- Occupations: Entertainer, dancer, choreographer
- Agent: Tove Nerman
- Spouse: Alexander Skiöldsparr (m. 2015)

Anthony Spencer Irving (born 5 July 1966) is a British-born Swedish TV personality, radio presenter, and entertainer. He is best known as the jury chairman on TV4's dance program Let's Dance in Sweden.

== Life and career ==
Irving grew up in Ainsworth. He became famous in Sweden in 2006 when starring as a judge on the popular television show Let's Dance. He has also written several books, starred in other Swedish TV programs, and performed on stage.

Irving hosts the radio show Äntligen Lördag (Finally Saturday), at Mix Megapol, every Saturday from 11am to 3pm. He plays the character Mr Red in the cabaret show Wild Thing at Metropol Palais in Stockholm, and also performs regularly on the cruise ship Viking Line (Cinderella). He has written the books Move your ass, Tony Irving 10, and the autobiography Life, Love and Passion, co-written with Linda Newhamn.

In 2016, Irving's TV show Camping Queens premiered with co-star Jonas Hallberg on channel 7.

During his 33-year career, he has run dance schools in America, England, and Sweden. He established and now operates the Tony Irving Dance Academy in Stockholm, Sweden.

Irving moved to Sweden in 1993, becoming a judge in the Swedish Ballroom Dancing Championship. He has represented the United States, England, and Sweden as a professional international sports dancer. He has been a finalist in several international competitions. In 2001 and 2002, he was the Swedish champion in professional dance. Irving holds all international judging licences, and has judged many world ranking competitions. He is one of the few international adjudicators to have judged four world championships.

== Personal life ==
Tony Irving lives with his husband Alexander Skiöldsparr in Norrtälje with their dogs.
