= Cecilia Ehrling =

Swedish competitive dancer

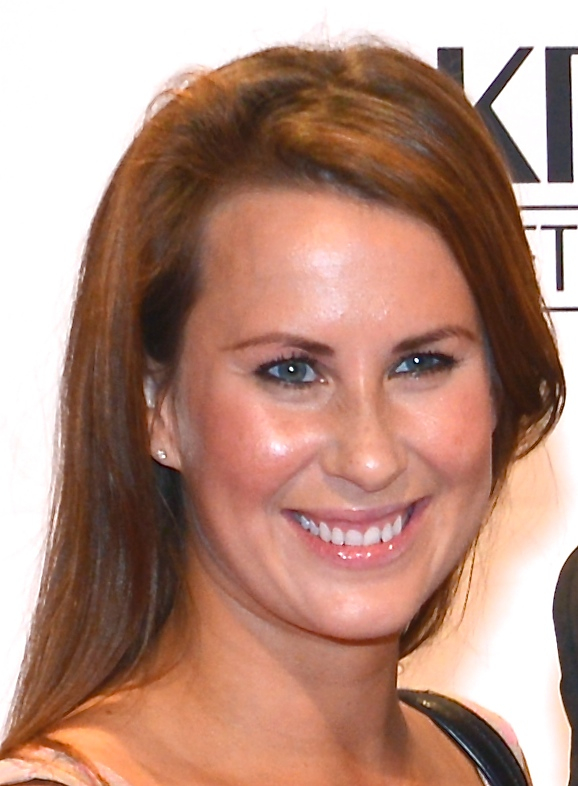
- Cecilia Ehrling during the Kristallen Awards in August 2013
- Born: 22 May 1984 (age 42); Gävle, Sweden
- Occupation: Dancer
- Known for: Let's Dance

Cecilia Ehrling (born 22 May 1984) is a Swedish competitive dancer. She has won the TV4 dance show Let's Dance four times, in 2007 along with Martin Lidberg, in 2010 with Mattias Andréasson, in 2013 with Markoolio and in 2015 with Ingemar Stenmark. She has participated in the dance show every year since the 2007, dancing with celebrities like Richard Herrey, Anders Bagge, Anders Timell and Steffo Törnquist. In 2015, she competed in Let's Dance 2015 where she teamed up with Ingemar Stenmark. She participated in Let's Dance 2016 with Johan Rabaeus where the couple was the second to be voted off.

She has also competed in Eurovision Dance Contest 2007 along with Martin Lidberg, the couple placed 14th after the voting.
