= Ögon som glittrar =

1982 single by Freestyle

Single by Freestyle

from the album Modiga agenter
- Language: Swedish
- B-side: "Om och om igen"
- Released: 1982
- Genre: Synth-pop
- Length: 3:03
- Label: Sound of Scandinavia
- Songwriters: Christer Sandelin; Tommy Ekman; Gigi Hamilton
- Producer: Ulf Wahlberg

Freestyle singles chronology
"Fantasi" (1981)	"Ögon som glittrar" (1982)	"Modiga agenter" (1982)

Audio
- "Ögon som glittrar" on YouTube

"Ögon som glittrar" is a song by Swedish pop band Freestyle, released in 1982 as the lead single from their second studio album, Modiga agenter (1982).

== Track listing and formats ==
- Swedish 7-inch single

A. "Ögon som glittrar" – 3:03
B. "Om och om igen" – 3:54

- Swedish 12-inch single

A. "Ögon som glittrar" (Re-mix) – 4:38
B. "Om och om igen" – 3:54

== Charts ==
Weekly chart performance for "Ögon som glittrar"
Chart (1982)	Peak position
Finland (Suomen virallinen lista)	1
Norway (VG-lista)	8
Sweden (Sverigetopplistan)	3
