= Fantasi =

1981 single by Freestyle

Single by Freestyle

from the album Fantasi
- Language: Swedish
- B-side: "Rider omkring"
- Released: 1981
- Genre: Synth-pop
- Length: 2:50
- Label: Sound of Scandinavia
- Songwriters: Tommy Ekman; Christer Sandelin
- Producer: Ulf Wahlberg

Freestyle singles chronology
"Vill ha dej" (1981)	"Fantasi" (1981)	"Ögon som glittrar" (1982)

"Fantasi" is a song by Swedish pop band Freestyle, released in 1981 as the second single from their debut studio album, Fantasi (1981).

== Track listing and formats ==
- Swedish 7-inch single

A. "Fantasi" – 2:50
B. "Rider omkring" – 2:44

== Charts ==
Weekly chart performance for "Fantasi"
Chart (1981–1982)	Peak position
Finland (Suomen virallinen lista)	2
Sweden (Sverigetopplistan)	13

1998 weekly chart performance for "Fantasi '98"
Chart (1998)	Peak position
Sweden (Sverigetopplistan)	37

2023 weekly chart performance for "Fantasi"
Chart (2023)	Peak position
Sweden Heatseeker (Sverigetopplistan)	4
