= Modiga agenter =

1982 studio album by Freestyle

Studio album by Freestyle
- Released: 1982
- Studio: Polar, Stockholm
- Genre: Synth-pop; new wave
- Length: 34:51
- Label: Sound of Scandinavia
- Producer: Ulf Wahlberg

Freestyle chronology
Fantasi (1981)	Modiga agenter (1982)	Freestyle's bästa (1986)

Singles from Modiga agenter
- 1. "Ögon som glittrar" Released: 1982

Modiga agenter is the second studio album by the Swedish pop band Freestyle. It was released in 1982 and was also recorded in English, titled Mission Impossible.

== Track listing ==
Side one
No.	Title	Writer(s)	Length
1.	"Att leka med känslor"	Tommy Ekman; Christer Sandelin; Joakim Hagleitner; Gigi Hamilton	3:10
2.	"Jag vill att du ska veta"	Ekman; Sandelin; Hamilton	3:06
3.	"Svårt att välja"	Ekman; Sandelin	3:50
4.	"Om och om igen"	Ekman; Sandelin; Hagleitner; Anders Uddberg	3:56
5.	"Under täcket"	Ekman; Sandelin	3:10
Total length:			17:12

Side two
No.	Title	Writer(s)	Length
1.	"Modiga agenter"	Ekman; Sandelin	3:15
2.	"Alla balla robotar"	Ekman; Sandelin; Hamilton	2:58
3.	"Ögon som glittrar"	Ekman; Sandelin; Hamilton	4:58
4.	"Lollita"	Ekman; Sandelin	3:50
5.	"Panta rei"	Uddberg	2:38
Total length:			17:39

== Charts ==
Chart (1982)	Peak position
Norwegian Albums (VG-lista)	13
Swedish Albums (Sverigetopplistan)	4
