= The Graaf Sisters =

Swedish musical duo

Graaf Sisters
- Origin: Stockholm, Sweden
- Genres: Eurodance; Pop; Dance
- Years active: 1998-2001
- Labels: Sony BMG
- Past members: Hannah Graaf; Magdalena Graaf

The Graaf Sisters, or Graaf, consists of two Swedish glamour models by the name of Hannah and Magdalena Graaf. The two earned notoriety for appearing in men's magazines together. In 1998, they both gave up glamour modeling and established the pop group named, Graaf. The group is best known for their hit, "You Got What I Want".

== History ==
In her early teens, Hannah worked as a fashion model. After seeing how much success Pamela Anderson had, Hannah decided to get breast augmentation and pursue glamour modeling. Hannah began modeling with her older sister Magdalena. The two became immensely popular and were featured in Slitz, Café, and Moore Magazine. The pair received a lot of heat for appearing in lads magazines together which only generated more buzz for the pair.

In 1998, the sisters gave up glamour modeling to pursue a music career. In their youth, the sisters grew up singing in the Swedish Pentecostal Church. With successful modeling careers behind them, the pair formed the musical duo, The Graaf Sisters. Under the guidance of producers Christer Sandelin, Per Adebratt, and Tommy Ekman, the two released their debut album Graaf. They earned some success with their debut single You Got (What I Want).

== Controversy ==
In 2002, the sisters were involved in a civil suit against Michael Brinkenstierna. Brinkenstierna alleged that the sisters began working with him in 1996 and that they had a management contract in which he was entitled to 25% of all revenues from the sisters' future disc sales. After the success of their first album, Brinkenstierna received no money after he allegedly spent hours helping them be a success. The sisters claim that Brinkenstierna gave them nothing but money and accused him of being a crook after a similar dispute Brinkenstierna had with the pop group, Aqua.

== Discography ==
=== Albums ===
- Graaf (1998)

=== Singles ===
Title	Year	Peak chart positions	Album
Title	Year	SWE	Album
"You Got What I Want"	1998	-	Graaf

== See also ==
- Hannah Graaf
- Magdalena Graaf
