= Dover–Calais =

1986 single by Style

Single by Style

from the album Heaven No. 7
- Language: Swedish
- B-side: "Camera, Action!"
- Released: 1986
- Genre: Synth-pop
- Length: 2:49
- Label: Alpha
- Songwriters: Tommy Ekman; Christer Sandelin
- Producers: Tommy Ekman; Christer Sandelin

Style singles chronology
"Give Me a Night to Remember" (1985)	"Dover–Calais" (1986)	"Följ mej" (1986)

"Dover–Calais" is a ballad song written by Tommy Ekman and Christer Sandelin, and originally performed by Style on 22 March 1986 at Melodifestivalen where the song ended up third.

The song lyrics describe a love meeting between two people on board a ferryboat moving across the English Channel between the UK and France in a pre-"Chunnel" era.

The song topped the Swedish singles chart, and peaked at 6th position in Norway. At Svensktoppen the song stayed for 18 weeks between the period of 13 April–29 June 1986, topping the chart during the seven first weeks.

On 29 March 1986 the song also entered Trackslistan, reaching the first position on 5 April that year.

== Track listing and formats ==
- Swedish 7-inch single

A. "Dover–Calais" – 2:49
B. "Camera, Action!" – 3:50

- Swedish 12-inch single

A. "Dover–Calais" (Extended Version) – 3:56
B1. "Drömmar" – 3:52
B2. "Love Is Blind" – 4:11

== Charts ==
Weekly chart performance for "Dover–Calais"
Chart (1986)	Peak position
Norway (VG-lista)	6
Sweden (Sverigetopplistan)	1
