= Fantasi (album) =

1981 studio album by Freestyle

Studio album by Freestyle
- Released: 1981
- Studio: Decibel Studios, Stockholm
- Genre: Synth-pop
- Label: Sound of Scandinavia
- Producer: Ulf Wahlberg

Freestyle chronology
Fantasi (1981)	Modiga agenter (1982)

Singles from Fantasi
- 1. "Vill ha dej" Released: 1981; 2. "Fantasi" Released: 1981

Fantasi is the debut studio album by Swedish pop band Freestyle. Produced by Ulf Wahlberg, it was released by the Swedish label Sound of Scandinavia in 1983. The album was also recorded in English, as "Fantasy". In South America, the album was released as "Free Style" consisting of two songs with lyrics in Spanish. The album is one of the titles in the 2009 book Tusen svenska klassiker.

== Track listing ==
Side one
No.	Title	Writer(s)	Length
1.	"Nära dig"	Tommy Ekman; Christer Sandelin
2.	"Bubblar"	Ekman; Sandelin; Joakim Hagleitner; Anders Uddberg
3.	"Kom till mig"	Ekman; Sandelin
4.	"Rider omkring"	Ekman; Sandelin
5.	"Fångad i tiden"	Björn Håkansson
6.	"Är det värt"	Ekman; Sandelin; Hagleitner

Side two
No.	Title	Writer(s)	Length
1.	"Vill ha dej"	Tommy Ekman; Christer Sandelin; Joakim Hagleitner; Anders Uddberg
2.	"Heta nätter"	Ekman; Sandelin; Hagleitner; Uddberg
3.	"Resa i tiden"	Ekman; Sandelin; Uddberg
4.	"Fantasi"	Ekman; Sandelin
5.	"Leva livet"	Ekman; Sandelin; Hagleitner; Uddberg
6.	"Ensam i natten"	Hagleitner

== Charts ==
Chart (1981–1982)	Peak position
Norwegian Albums (VG-lista)	7
Swedish Albums (Sverigetopplistan)	1
