= Erika Johnson =

Swedish glamour model and actress (born 1982)

- Born: 1982 (age 43–44); Sweden
- Modeling information
- Height: 1.75 m (5 ft 9 in)
- Hair color: Blonde
- Eye color: Blue

Erika Johnson (born 1982) is a Swedish glamour model and actress.

== Career ==
She won Miss Hawaiian Tropics Sweden in 2001 and later went on to win the international version. Since then, she has appeared in Swedish men's magazines such as Café, Moore Magazine, and Slitz as well as Swedish Elle. Johnson has been featured on the cover of Café twice, first in August 2001 and second in January 2002. Currently, Johnson is signed to Bingo Models, The Agency.

In addition to her modeling career, Johnson appeared in Boat Trip alongside Victoria Silvstedt, After School Special, and American Standard. She also has been featured on US entertainment channel, E!.

== Personal life ==
Johnson briefly lived in Los Angeles; during this time she learned how to DJ.
