= Emma Johnsson =

Swedish glamour model (born 1979)

Emma Johnsson (born in 1979 in Eksjö, Sweden) is a Swedish glamour model.

== Career ==
She first came to prominence after winning the 1999 Hawaiian Tropic bikini contest. Johnsson is also a Page Three Girl for the British tabloid The Sun. She has also appeared in a commercial for TeliaSonera broadcast on TV in Norway and Finland.

She has appeared in numerous men's magazines. She first appeared in Slitz in 1999. She has the second most Café Magazine covers (4) next to Victoria Silvstedt, who has ten. In 2004, Johnsson was featured in American Playboy.

She has also tested for the sequel to Martin Scorsese's Casino.
