= Magdalena Graaf =

Swedish model, singer, and author (born 1975)

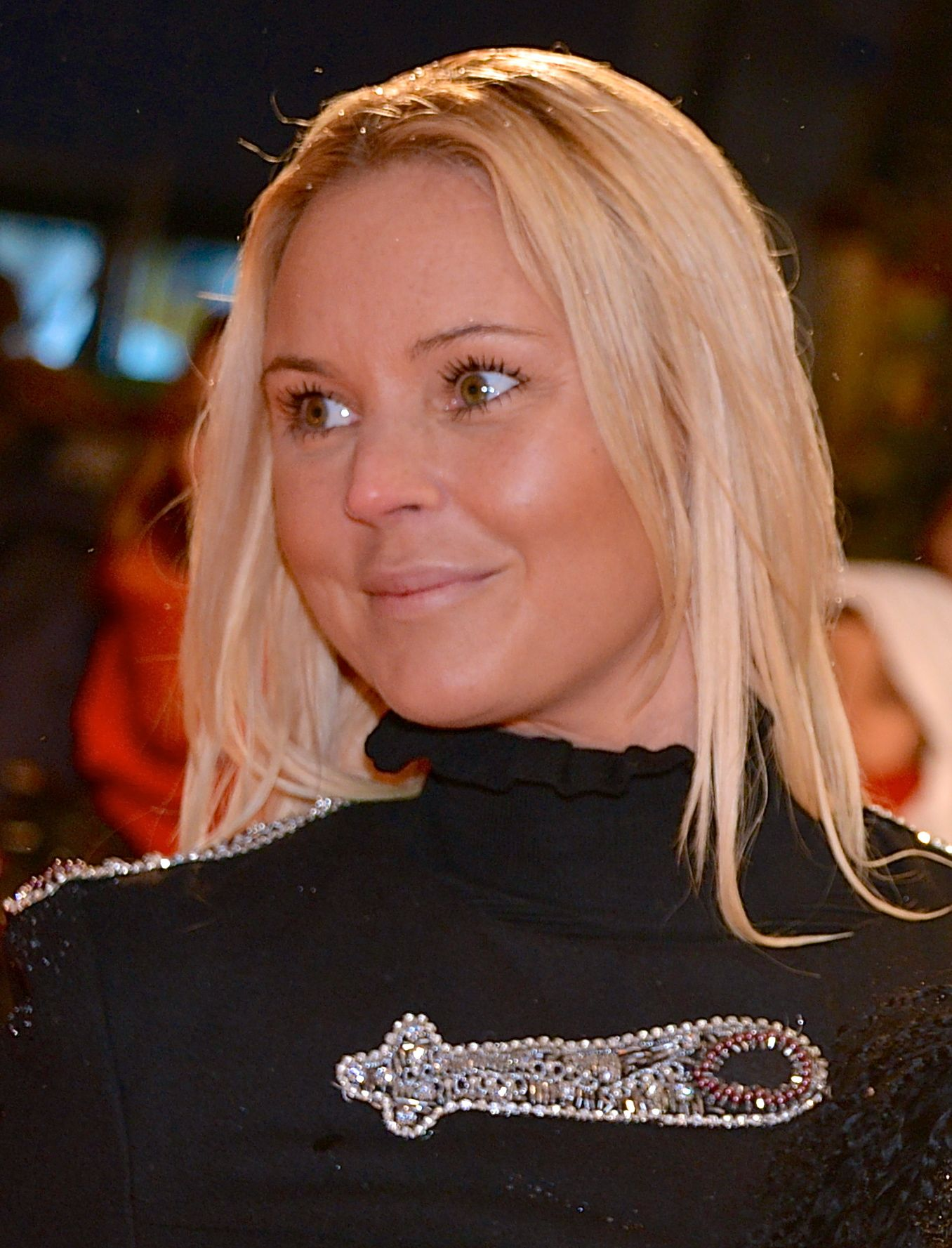
- Born: Engla Maria Magdalena Graaf; 2 September 1975 (age 51); Gothenburg, Sweden
- Spouses: Unknown (m. 1995–1996) Magnus Hedman (m. 1999–2007)
- Children: 5
- Modeling information
- Height: 1.69 m (5 ft 7 in)
- Hair color: Blonde
- Eye color: Blue
- Website: magdalenagraaf.se

Engla Maria Magdalena Graaf (born 2 September 1975) is a Swedish model, singer, and author. In 1998, she and her sister Hannah joined together and formed the group The Graaf Sisters, who became popular with the song "You Got What I Want Baby". She was also the wife of footballer Magnus Hedman and as a result has been voted the sexiest footballer's wife.

== Early years ==
Graaf was born in Gothenburg, but she grew up in Kungsängen in Stockholm County, to Swedish Pentecostal parents.

In her late teens, Graaf became pregnant with her son Isak. Instead of burdening or embarrassing her religious parents, she married her Finnish gangster boyfriend Jorma whom she was already living with. During this time, she was physically and emotionally abused.

After Graaf was shot in the leg, she left her husband despite threats against her and her family. She eventually reported him to the proper authorities. As a result, she was placed under protective custody and given new identities. She and her son were moved throughout Sweden but eventually settled in Gothenburg and was given the new names of Michaela and Ville for her son.

Her husband was eventually released from prison and he put a 50 000 SEK bounty on her and a reward for hurting her sister model, Hannah. After her husband's indictment, the police did little to help Graaf. She did receive some help from a policewoman who would eventually get fired for helping Graaf. To this day, Graaf has a bitter disdain for the Swedish authorities. Her plight eventually was heard by former MC gang leader who felt bad for her and decided to protect Graaf. Finally, Graaf had enough of hiding and returned home to her mother. Later her ex-husband decided to stop the harassment.

== Career ==
=== Modeling ===
Due to all the stress following the aftermath her ex-husband's indictment, Graaf lost a great deal of weight and suffered from lack of confidence. She underwent breast augmentation and started an exercise regimen. Her sister Hannah, an established model, took her to a celebrity party where she met E-Type who hit on her. She claims this boosted her confidence and being seen on the party scene with her sister landed her a modeling career.

Graaf followed the footsteps of her younger sister and began glamour modeling. Graaf would often model with her sister Hannah. The two gained notoriety for appearing in countless men's magazines. The controversy catapulted lesser known Graaf's career. She has appeared in the magazines Café, Moore, and Slitz. In 1998, Graaf appeared on three separate Café covers.

In 2004, The Graaf were looking for a comeback. The sisters flew to Los Angeles and did a pictorial for FHM magazine.

=== Music ===
The Graaf sisters became a cultural phenomenon and, by 1998 both sisters gave up glamour modeling to pursue a music career. That same year, she formed a musical duo The Graaf Sisters with Hannah and was quickly signed to Sony BMG. The two worked with producers Christer Sandelin, Tommy Ekman, and Rob 'n' Raz. The record yielded the Swedish No. 1 hit "You Got (What I Want)". The duo has since been on hiatus with both women marrying and having children.

In 2002, the sisters were involved in a civil suit against Mikael Brinkstierna. Brinkstierna alleged that the sisters began working with him in 1996 and that they had a management contract in which he was entitled to 25% of all revenues from the sisters' future disc sales. After the success of their first album, Brinkstierna received no money after he allegedly spent hours helping them be a success. The sisters claim that Brinkstierna gave them nothing but money and accused him of being a crook after a similar dispute Brinkstierna had with the pop group Aqua.

=== Author ===
In March 2006, Graaf released her biography Det ska bli ett sant nöje att döda dig ("It is going to be a true pleasure to kill you"), where she tells about her childhood and her first, problematic marriage. The title of her book was the last thing her ex-husband Jorma said to her before she left him and fled with their son Isak.

=== Television ===
Graaf participated in the Swedish edition of Dancing with the Stars (Let's Dance) until the end of January 2009, when she was forced to quit due to a cerebral hemorrhage. She also works for Postkodlotteriet and gives the winners money, Postkodsmiljonären where the main show is broadcast on TV4.

== Personal life ==
In 1995, she gave birth to her first son, Isak, with her first husband. A year and a half after Isak's birth, Graaf left her husband in 1996. In 1999, Graaf married Swedish football goalkeeper Magnus Hedman. The couple had two sons named Lancelot (born in 2000) and Tristan (born in 2004). During their early marriage, the couple lived in the outskirts of Northampton, England, UK, where Hedman was playing football with Celtic.

After Hedman's retirement the couple resided in Stockholm. In 2006, Graaf separated from Hedman after news papers reported an alleged affair with singer Linda Bengtzing. The couple have since divorced.

Her fourth son, Charlie, was born in 2011. Her oldest son Isak died in an accident on 25 August 2014. She gave birth to her fifth son Louie in 2016.

== Charity ==
The Sisters made Time Magazine's List of European Heroes for their charity work. Magdalena along with Hannah have donated earnings from their modeling to aid orphanages in Nagpur in central India. The sisters maintain that they never have strayed too far from their Pentecostal upbringing and that their commitment for charity was inherited from their mother Linda Bergling who worked as a missionary in Asia and Africa. Not only have the donated money to the cause but they have built two orphanages and school. Magdelena's then husband, Magnus claimed Magdalena would constantly hit up his friends for donations at parties.
