= Slitz =

Swedish magazine

- Editor-in-chief: Mats Drougge
- Categories: Men's
- Frequency: Monthly
- First issue: 1980
- Final issue: December 2012
- Country: Sweden
- Based in: Stockholm
- Language: Swedish
- Website: www.slitz.se

Slitz was a monthly Swedish men's magazine that was published in Stockholm, Sweden, between 1980 and 2012.

== History ==
Slitz was initially created in 1985 when the two music magazines Schlager and Ritz merged. The magazine continued to be a music publication until 1996 when it was relaunched as a men's lifestyle magazine similar to Café. After this Slitz became a men's magazine with content similar to FHM and Maxim, featuring articles about sex, crime, cars, games, entertainment, and gadgets.

The magazine was published by MDM Media AB in Stockholm and featured some of Sweden's most prevalent glamour models. Its main competitors were the magazines Café, Moore Magazine and the Swedish edition of FHM. Slitz was also available in Finland, since a part of the population in Finland has Swedish as their native language. As of 2008, Slitz had a reader circulation of 135,000 with 12 issues a year. The same year its circulation was 32,600 copies.

In 2005, Slitz launched Slitz Man which focused more on style and fashion. By 2007, Slitz aimed to change the concept of the magazine due to the trend of declining sales of most men's magazines. Men's magazines such as Loaded had reported a decline in sales while the circulation of men's fashion magazines had increased. "We have noticed a change in our target audience. The Swedish boy is slowly dying. Our conclusion is that Swedish guys of today are asking for a smarter magazine and not a magazine with the degree of nudity that we have had before," said Chief Editor Niklas Natt och Dag.

In December 2012 the decision was made to discontinue the magazine. The Christmas issue of 2012 was the last issue of Slitz.

== Content ==
The men's magazine had content similar to FHM, Stuff and Maxim. The magazine dealt with topics such as sex, crime, cars, music, movies, games, and the outdoors. The magazine featured glamour models wearing bikinis or lingerie. However, the girls in Slitz occasionally appeared topless or bottomless from only the back or side, but never with full frontal nudity.

Among some of the famous glamour model who have appeared in the magazine are Elin Grindemyr, Emma Johnsson, Erika Johnson, Oksana Andersson, Natacha Peyre, Pernilla Lundberg, Hannah Graaf, Magdalena Graaf, Anine Bing, and Victoria Silvstedt. The magazine has also featured celebrities such as football star Josefine Öqvist.

Like Playboy, Slitz had their own version of playmate of the year aptly called Miss Slitz.

== Controversy ==
Slitz claimed to be the magazine that first found Victoria Silvstedt, who became a Playboy Playmate in December 1996 and Playmate of the Year in 1997.

In 2006, Tone Bekkestad, a Norwegian meteorologist, appeared in the magazine. As a result, she was suspended from her work as meteorologist and weather presenter for the Swedish TV channel TV4. The suspension lasted for 3 months.

== Editors ==
- Editor in chief and publisher: Mats Drougge
