= Style (band) =

Swedish pop group

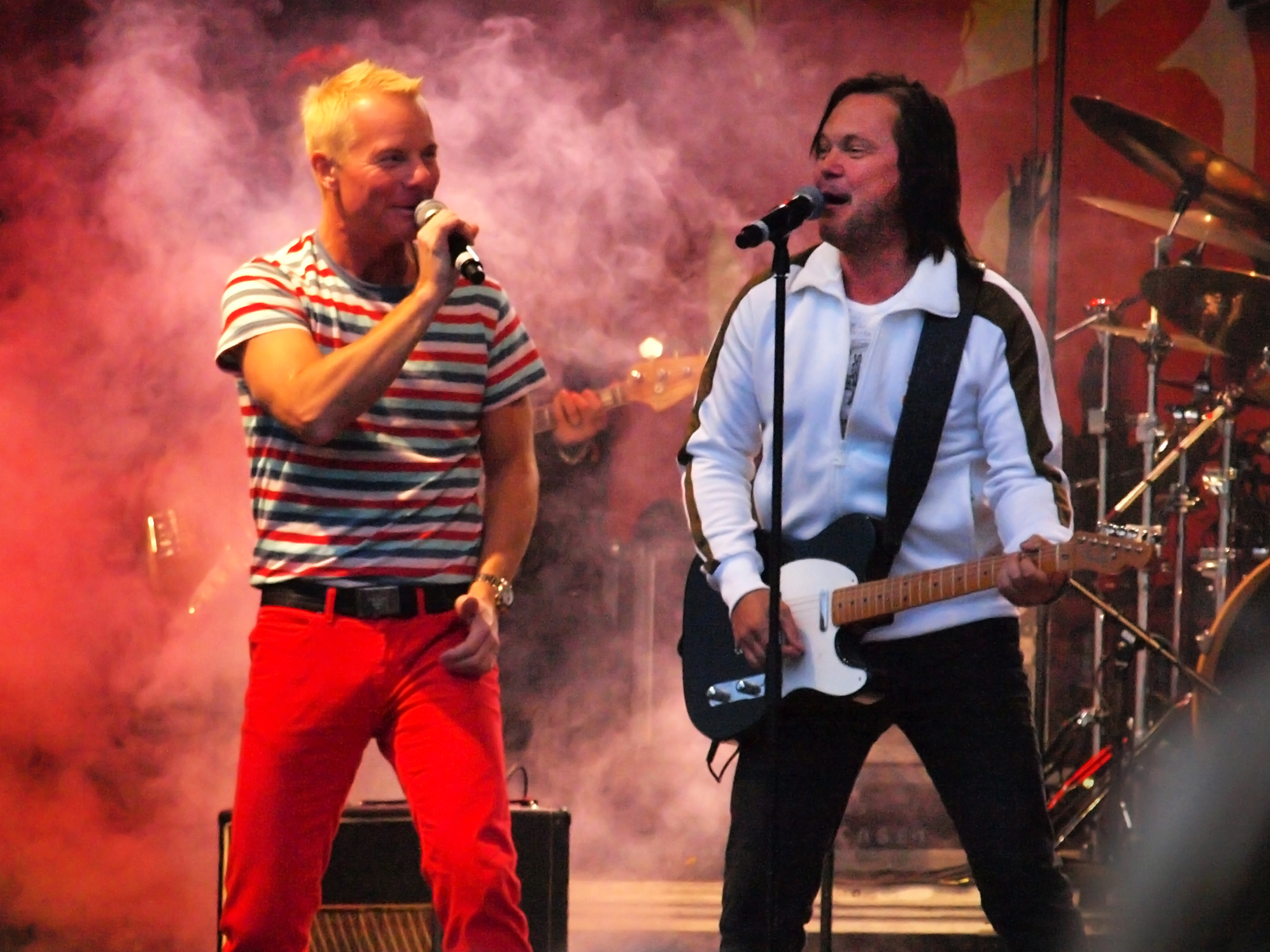
- Style on stage in Falun, Sweden in 2009.

Background information
- Origin: Sweden
- Genres: Pop, electronic, rock
- Years active: 1983–1989, 2009–present
- Labels: Bubble, Sound Of Scandinavia, Sire, Alpha
- Spinoff of: Freestyle
- Members: Tommy Ekman; Christer Sandelin; Gigi Hamilton

Style is a Swedish pop band which had its greatest success in the 1980s. Style was formed by three former Freestyle members in 1983. They participated in the Swedish Melodifestivalen 1986 with their song "Dover–Calais" finishing third, and 1987 with their song "Hand i hand" finishing sixth. Style split in 1989 due to musical differences. They were reunited again for the Swedish Melodifestivalen 2003 with their song "Stay the Night". In 2006, Style returned for a nostalgia tour in Sweden and Norway. In 2009, Christer Sandelin and Tommy Ekman briefly reunited under the name of Style and released the compilation album Best Of Style with new tracks "När Jag Ser Dig" and "Vill ha dej igen".

== Discography ==
=== Singles ===
- Love Is Knocking on My Door/Längtar tillbaks till dig (1983)
- Telefon (1984)
- Du och jag (1985)
- Vision av kärlek (1985)
- Telephone (1985) U.S. DANCE #16
- Give Me a Night to Remember/På jakt (efter guld som glimmar) (1986)
- Dover–Calais (1986) SWE #1
- Följ mig (1986)
- Heaven No 7 (1986)
- Shine On (1986)
- Hand i hand (1987) SWE #20
- Run for Your Life (1987) SWE #4
- Daylight Robbery (1987)
- New World (1987)
- Empty Bed (1988) SWE #4
- It's a Secret (1988) SWE #3
- Question of Time (1988)
- Sentimental (1988)
- Empty Bed (International release) (1989)
- Stay the Night (2003)
- När jag ser dig (2008)
- Vill ha dej, igen (2009)

=== Albums ===
- So Chic (1983) SWE #32
- Visioner (1985)
- Heaven No 7 (1986) SWE #3
- Daylight Robbery (1987) SWE #7
- 12 bästa (1987)
- Question of Time (1988) SWE #4
- Samlade hits (2003) SWE #7
- Best of Style - Det Ni Vill Ha (2008)
- Vill ha dej igen (2009) #9
