= Svensk Damtidning =

Women's magazine in Sweden

- Cover of Svensk Damtidning from the magazine's centennial year, 1989.
- Categories: Women's magazine
- Frequency: Weekly
- Publisher: Aller Media AB
- Founded: 1889; 137 years ago
- Company: Aller Media
- Country: Sweden
- Based in: Helsingborg
- Language: Swedish
- Website: Svensk Damtidning
- ISSN: 0039-6486
- OCLC: 487916158

Svensk Damtidning (Swedish: Swedish Women's Weekly) is a weekly women's magazine published in Sweden since 1889. The magazine is headquartered in Helsingborg.

== History and profile ==
The magazine was established in 1889. Svensk Damtidning is part of Aller Media and is published by Aller Media AB on a weekly basis. Its headquarters is in Helsingborg.

During the initial period, Svensk Damtidning targeted all women without a special reference concerning social class, but later it was called a royal lifestyle magazine due to its focus as, from the 1970s, it began to cover celebrity news and focus on the news about the European royal families. Its audience is women aged between 20 and 49.

Men's magazine, Café, is one of its sister magazines.

Svensk Damtidning was named by the Swedish Magazine Publishers Association as the magazine of 2014 in Sweden.

Just after one year after its publication Svensk Damtidning became the second best-selling women's magazine in Sweden. In 2007 the magazine sold 139,00 copies making it the eighth largest magazine in the country. Both in 2011 and in 2013 the magazine was the sixth best-selling magazine in Sweden. The 2011 circulation of the magazine was 145,600 copies. Its circulation was 144,600 copies in 2013.
