= Hannah Graaf =

Swedish glamour model and singer (born 1978)

Hannah Graaf Karyd
- Born: Hanna Rakel Serafia Graf; 31 August 1978 (age 48); Gothenburg, Sweden
- Spouses: David Boudal (m. 2003–2006) Peter Karyd (m. 2008)
- Children: 4
- Modeling information
- Height: 1.73 m (5 ft 8 in)
- Hair color: Blonde
- Eye color: Blue
- Website: hannahgraaf.com

Hannah Rakel Serafia Graaf Karyd (born Graf 31 August 1978) is a Swedish glamour model and singer. Graaf along with her model sister, Magdalena, formed a musical duo called The Graaf Sisters.

== Early years ==
Graaf was born in Gothenburg, but grew up in Kungsängen, Stockholm County. Graaf grew up singing in the Swedish Pentecostal Church. Due to her tall stature, Graaf began modeling in her teens.

== Career ==
=== Modeling ===
Graaf would regularly appear in men's magazine with her older sister Magdalena Graaf. The two courted controversy which created a great deal of publicity for the sisters. In 1998, the sisters stopped modeling to focus on their music career. After one record, the sisters quit and Magdalena focused her attentions on her family. In 2000, Graaf tried to reinvent herself by dying her hair brown and donning brown contacts, the exact opposite of her former blonde bombshell appearance. She appeared on the cover of Cafe with her new look. She kept this look well into 2001 until the birth of her son.

In 2004, The Graaf sisters were looking for a comeback. The sisters flew to Los Angeles and did a pictorial for FHM magazine.

=== Music ===
In 1998, Graaf gave up glamour modeling to pursue a music career. That same year, she formed a musical duo The Graaf Sisters, with Magdalena. The two worked with producers Christer Sandelin, Tommy Ekman, and Rob 'n' Raz. The record yielded the Swedish No. 1 hit "You Got (What I Want)". The two toured extensively which Hannah describes as a fun and exciting time in her life. The duo has since been on hiatus with both women marrying and having children.

In 2002, the sisters were involved in a civil suit against Mikael Brinkenstierna. Stierna alleged that the sisters began working with him in 1996 and that they had a management contract in which he was entitled to 25% of all revenues from the sisters' future disc sales. After the success of their first album, Brinkenstierna received no money after he allegedly spent hours helping them be a success. The sisters claim that Stierna gave them nothing but money and accused him of being a crook after a similar dispute Brinkenstierna had with the pop group, Aqua. After her divorce, Graaf took a brief foray into the music business. In 2006 she performed the song "Naughty Boy" in the Swedish Melodifestivalen, Sweden's selection for Eurovision Song Contest.

During late 2007, Graaf hosted the Idol 2007 aftershow called "Idol eftersnack" together with Doreen Månsson where they interviewed the contestant that had been voted off the show.

== Personal life ==
In 2000, she became pregnant, refusing to name the father. After her son was born in 2001, she revealed that Swedish mega-producer Andreas Carlsson was her son William's father. In 2003, Graaf married Daniel Boudal and had son, Mio, on 5 November 2003. The couple divorced in 2006 and Graaf eventually remarried in 2008 to Peter Karyd. Their first daughter Liv was born in 2009 and their second daughter Vida was born in 2012.

She is also the ex-sister-in-law to Swedish football player Magnus Hedman, who was married to her sister Magdalena.

== Charity ==
The Sisters made Time Magazine's List of European Heroes for their charity work. Magdalena along with Hannah have donated earnings from their modeling to aid orphanages in Nagpur in central India. The sisters maintain that they never have strayed too far from their Pentecostal upbringing and that their commitment for charity was inherited from their mother Linda Bergling who worked as a missionary in Asia and Africa. Not only have the donated money to the cause but they have built two orphanages and school.

== Discography ==
=== Singles ===
Title	Year	Peak chart positions	Album
Title	Year	SWE	Album
"Naughty Boy"	2006	58	Non-album singles
