= Bonnie Conte =

American model

Bonnie Conte is an American model. She was born and raised in San Diego, California. She has been featured numerous times in FHM magazine and has appeared on the covers and pages of many national and international magazines and catalogues. Conte was a Deal or No Deal model (Season 1). She has appeared on numerous commercials and other television shows and music videos.

She was Miss Miami Beach Hawaiian Tropic. She resides in Southern California where she continues her career.
