= Cassandra Lynn =

American model (1979–2014)

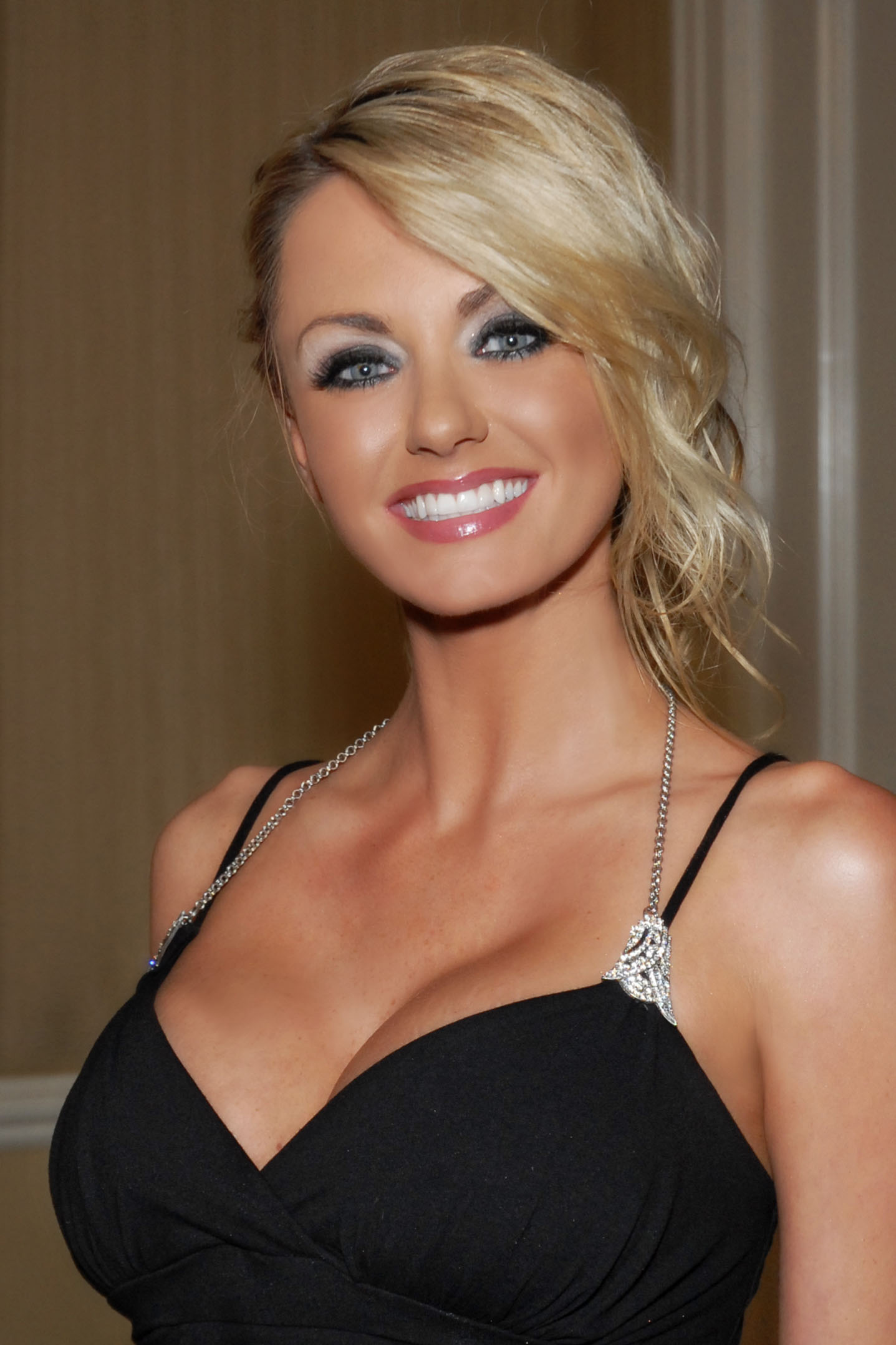
- Lynn in 2008

Playboy centerfold appearance
- February 2006
- Preceded by: Athena Lundberg
- Succeeded by: Monica Leigh

Personal details
- Born: Cassandra Lynn Jensen; August 15, 1979 Price, Utah
- Died: January 15, 2014 (aged 34) Los Angeles, California
- Height: 5 ft 5 in (1.65 m)

Cassandra Lynn Hensley (née Jensen, previously D'Elia, August 15, 1979 – January 15, 2014) was an American model and is Playboy's Playmate of the Month for February 2006. At age eighteen, Hensley moved to Newport Beach, California to study to become an aesthetician. She also opened a tanning salon and did some modeling. After placing in the Top 20 in a Hawaiian Tropic pageant, she submitted photos to Playboy. It was not until the second time she submitted photos that she received a callback and became a Playmate. She made an appearance on the television series Bikini Destinations in 2008.

Hensley was born in Price, Utah. She was found dead of an apparent overdose, in the bathtub at a friend's home in Los Angeles, California, on January 15, 2014.

Athena Lundberg	Cassandra Lynn	Monica Leigh	Holley Ann Dorrough	Alison Waite	Stephanie Larimore
Sara Jean Underwood	Nicole Voss	Janine Habeck	Jordan Monroe	Sarah Elizabeth	Kia Drayton
