= Lancelot (singer) =

Swedish singer

- Born: Carl Sör Lancelot Hedman; 21 July 2000 (age 26)
- Years active: 2020–present

Carl Sör Lancelot Hedman (born 21 July 2000), also known as Lancelot Hedman Graaf, is a Swedish singer. He competed in Melodifestivalen 2022 with the song "Lyckligt slut". He has starred in his own reality series Lance vs livet on TV3. He competed as a celebrity dancer in Let's Dance 2019 broadcast on TV4. In 2021, he participated in the TV show Behandlingen on Kanal 5.

His father is footballer Magnus Hedman, and his mother is model Magdalena Graaf.

== Discography ==
=== Studio albums ===
Title	Album details
Konsten att fly	Released: 25 August 2023; Format: Digital download; Label: Universal Music

=== Extended plays ===
Title	Extended play details
Medborgare av ingenstans	Released: 17 February 2023; Format: Digital download; Label: Universal Music

=== Singles ===
Title	Year	Peak chart positions	Album
Title	Year	SWE	Album
As part of Lance & Linton
"Best Time's Right Now"	2019	—	Non-album singles
"Sunshine" (original or featuring Jane Doe)	2019	77	Non-album singles
"I'm Alive"	2021	—	Non-album singles
"Death of Me"	2021	—	Non-album singles
As a soloist
"I Wanna Know"	2020	—	Non-album single
"Fördärvad"	2021	—	Medborgare av ingenstans
"Desdemona"	2021	—	Non-album singles
"Lyckligt slut"	2022	52	Non-album singles
"Blomma"	2022	—	Non-album singles
"Säg vad du vill"	2022	—	Non-album singles
"Spring"	2022	—	Non-album singles
"Jag vill inte ha dig tillbaks" (with Clara Klingenström)	2022	—	Non-album singles
"Förbjudet land" (with Lisa Howard)	2022	—	Non-album singles
"Medborgare av ingenstans"	2023	—	Medborgare av ingenstans
"Natten"	2023	—	Konsten att fly
"Förlåt"	2023	—	Konsten att fly
"När vi vaknar"	2023	—	Konsten att fly
"I dina armar"	2023	—	Konsten att fly
"Självisk" (with Papi Santana)	2025	— (Note: "Självisk" did not enter the Swedish singles chart, but peaked at number 3 on the Swedish Heatseeker chart.)	Non-album single
