= Vill ha dej =

1980 single by Freestyle

"Vill ha dej / I Want You"

Single by Freestyle

from the album Fantasi
- Language: Swedish (A-side)
- B-side: "I Want You" (in English)
- Released: 1980
- Length: 14:33
- Label: Sound of Scandinavia
- Songwriters: Tommy Ekman; Joakim Hagleitner; Christer Sandelin; Anders Uddberg
- Producer: Ulf Wahlberg

Freestyle singles chronology
"Running Away" (1980)	"Vill ha dej / I Want You" (1980)	"Fantasi" (1981)

"Vill ha dej" (also spelled "Vill ha dig", English: "I Want You") is a 1980 single by Swedish synthpop group Freestyle. While being about love, the song also references school and school classes. Side B of the vinyl contains English-language versions of the songs on the A side. It reached number one on the Swedish Topplistan for a five-week run.

== Track listing ==
Side A

1. "Vill ha dej" (3:40)
2. "Kom till mej" (3:28)

Side B

1. "I Want You" (3:30)
2. "Isn't That Fine" (3:55)

== Charts ==
Chart (1981)	Peak position
Norway (VG-lista)	2
Sweden (Sverigetopplistan)	1

== Drömhus version ==
"Vill ha dig"

Single by Drömhus

from the album Drömmar
- Released: 1998
- Studio: Dr. Records
- Length: 3:42
- Label: Dr.; CNR Music
- Songwriters: Tommy Ekman; Joakim Hagleitner; Christer Sandelin; Anders Uddberg
- Producer: Ari Lehtonen

Drömhus singles chronology
"Du och jag" (1997)	"Vill ha dig" (1998)	"Ge upp" (1998)

Music video
- "Vill ha dig" on YouTube

Swedish singer Drömhus (Therese Grankvist) released a cover version of the song as "Vill ha dig" in 1998. It was released as the second single from her debut album, Drömmar (Dreams) (1998), and peaked at number one in Denmark, Norway and Sweden. The song also reached number three in Finland and number 30 on the Eurochart Hot 100 in June 1998.

=== Track listing ===
- CD single, Scandinavia (1998)
1. "Vill ha dig" – 3:42
2. "Vill ha dig" (Extended) – 4:42
3. "Ja må hon leva" – 1:02

=== Charts ===
==== Weekly charts ====
Chart (1998)	Peak position
Denmark (IFPI)	1
Europe (Eurochart Hot 100)	30
Finland (Suomen virallinen lista)	3
Norway (VG-lista)	1
Sweden (Sverigetopplistan)	1

==== Year-end charts ====
Chart (1998)	Position
Sweden (Hitlistan)	8

=== Certifications ===
Region	Certification	Certified units/sales
Norway (IFPI Norway)	Platinum	
Sweden (GLF)	Platinum	30,000^{^}
^{^} Shipments figures based on certification alone.
