= Promotional model =

Person hired to increase product demand

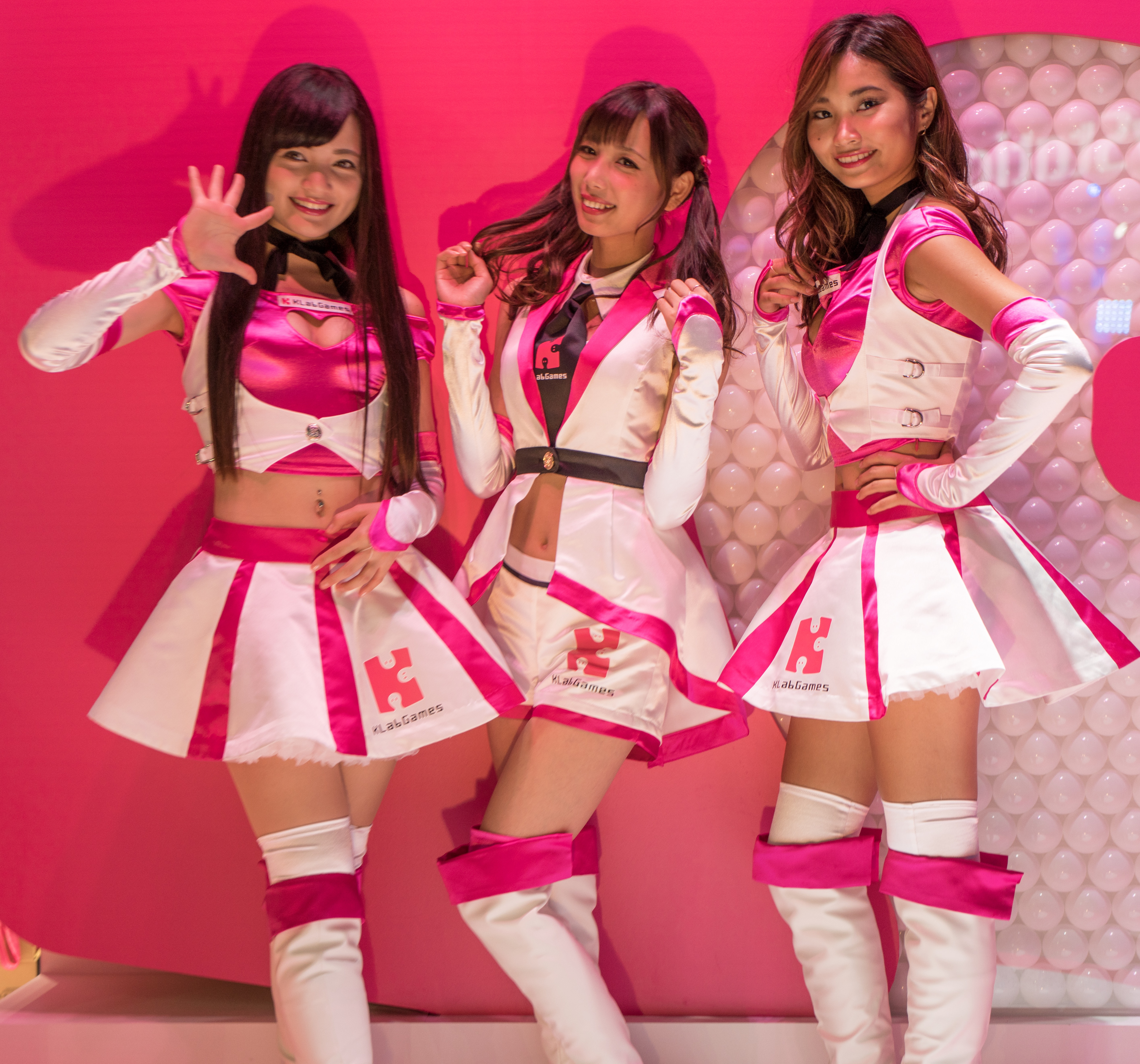
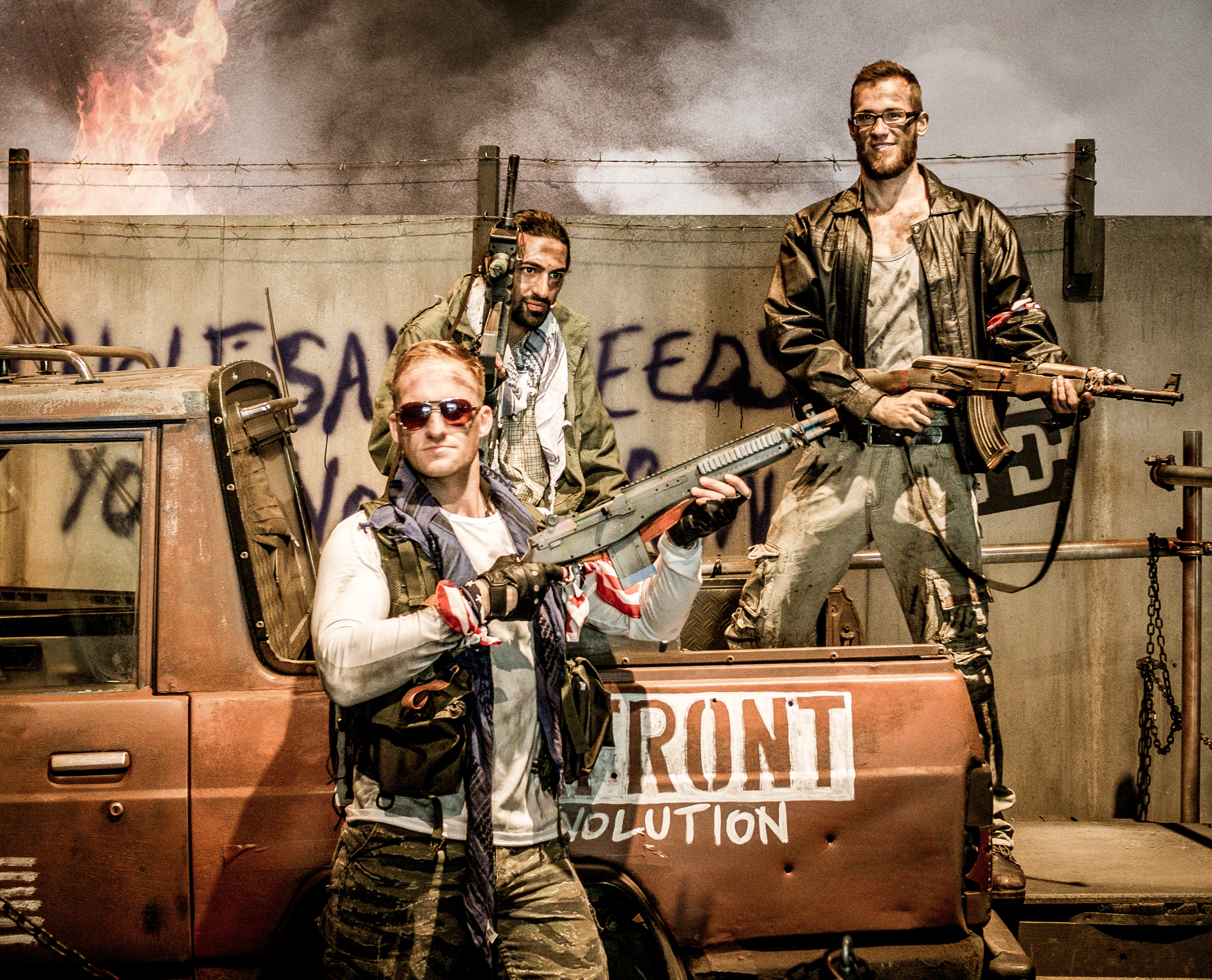
Above: female promotional models at Tokyo Game Show 2018. Below: male promotional models at Gamescom 2015, Cologne.

A promotional model is a model hired to drive consumer demand for a product, service, brand, or concept by directly interacting with potential customers. Most promotional models are conventionally attractive in physical appearance. They serve to make a product or service more appealing, and can provide information to journalists and consumers at trade shows and convention events. Promotional models are used in motorsports, other sports (such as dart competitions) or at trade shows, or they can act as "spokesmodels" to promote a specific brand or product in advertisements.

== Practice ==
While each model may not be directly employed by the company they represent, they can be trained to answer questions and provide customer feedback regarding products, services, and brand appeal. The responsibilities of the promotional model depend on the particular marketing campaign being carried out, and may include: increasing product awareness, providing product information, creating an association in the consumer's mind between the product or brand and a particular idea, and handing items to consumers, such as a sample of the product itself, a small gift, or printed information. Marketing campaigns that make use of promotional models may take place in retail stores or shopping malls, at trade shows, special promotional events, clubs, or even at outdoor public spaces. Promotional models may also be used as TV host/anchor for interviewing celebrities such as at film awards, sports events, etc. They are often placed at high traffic locations to reach as many consumers as possible, or at venues at which a particular type of target consumer is expected to be present.

=== Motorsports model ===
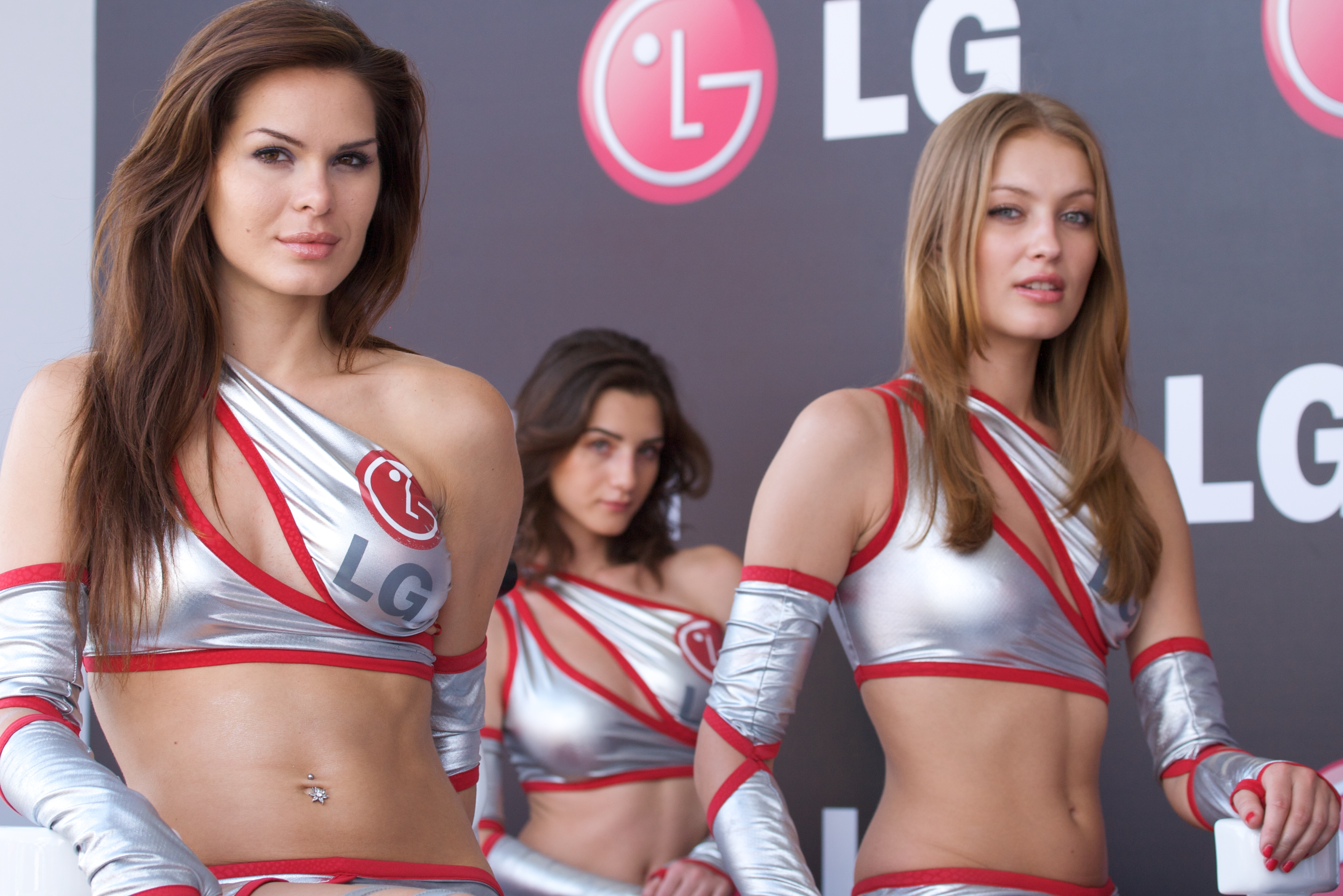
Grid girls at the 2009 Turkish Grand Prix Formula One event

The motorsports scene often uses promo models as part of a pit crew in certain kinds of motor racing. The first usage of promotional models in motor races was during the late 1960s. It was then that the term race queen was coined. Prior to that, women in motor races were mostly wives and girlfriends of drivers and staff, with the exception of some who were drivers. In 1983, the sun tan lotion company Hawaiian Tropic sponsored the 24 Hours of Le Mans. The company brought its models over from the United States wearing bikinis bearing the company's name to appear on the racetrack before the race began. That practice was imported over to Japan for the Suzuka 8 Hours motorcycle race in the mid-1980s.

The models, referred as grid girls or pit/paddock girls in Europe, are very common in many series worldwide. In the United States, they are referred to as umbrella girls. Because of the manner of dress of these models, insurance companies regard the models as a safety hazard because of stringent dress codes imposed in the garage and pit areas by many sanctioning bodies; in New Jersey, the stringent dress codes effectively ban the models. In DTM and some other events, organizers have started to recruit male models as in startlines, mostly on female drivers' cars. The Korean term for a race queen is a racing model (레이싱모델). Racing models appear in motor shows and racing events.

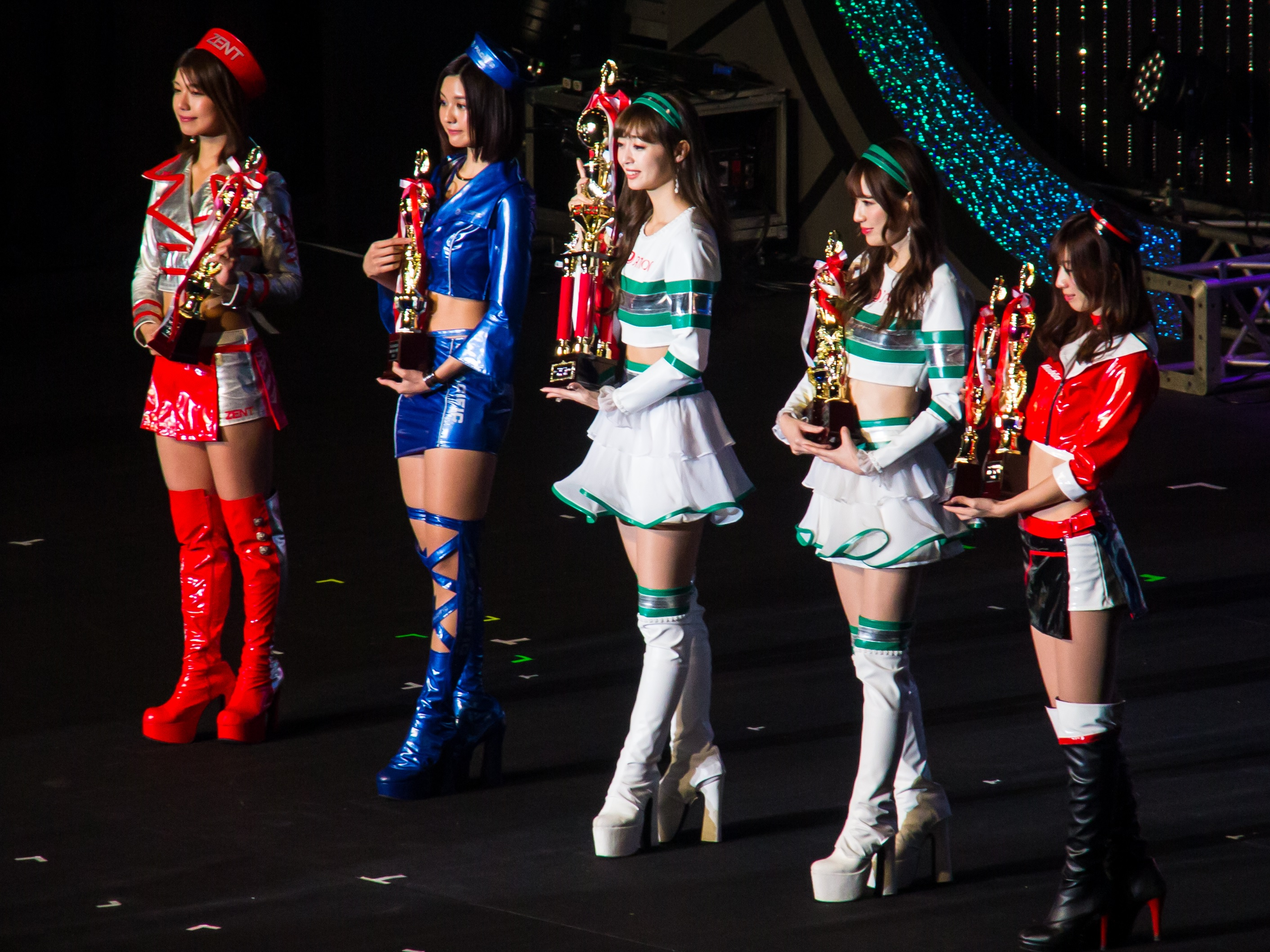
Winners of the Gals Paradise Japan Race Queen Award 2018

In Japan, there is a phenomenon of race queens (レースクイーン) being often regarded as "idols". The average age for these girls is late teens to early twenties and demand for them wanes with age. It is not unusual for some of them to have a background in or a sideline career as a gravure idol. Race queens who operate in prestigious events and with a large fanbase can also be found at auto shows purely to draw crowds where they are nearly as important an attraction as the cars or electronics products that they are promoting. There is a magazine dedicated to them called Gals Paradise.

During the race queen bubble of the late 1980s to late 1990s, a top race queen in Japan could earn 500,000 yen over two days or at least 200,000 yen. In 1993, that salary was 100,000 yen. After the boom era, the market price of race queens fell to 20,000 to 30,000 yen over two days.

=== Spokesmodel ===
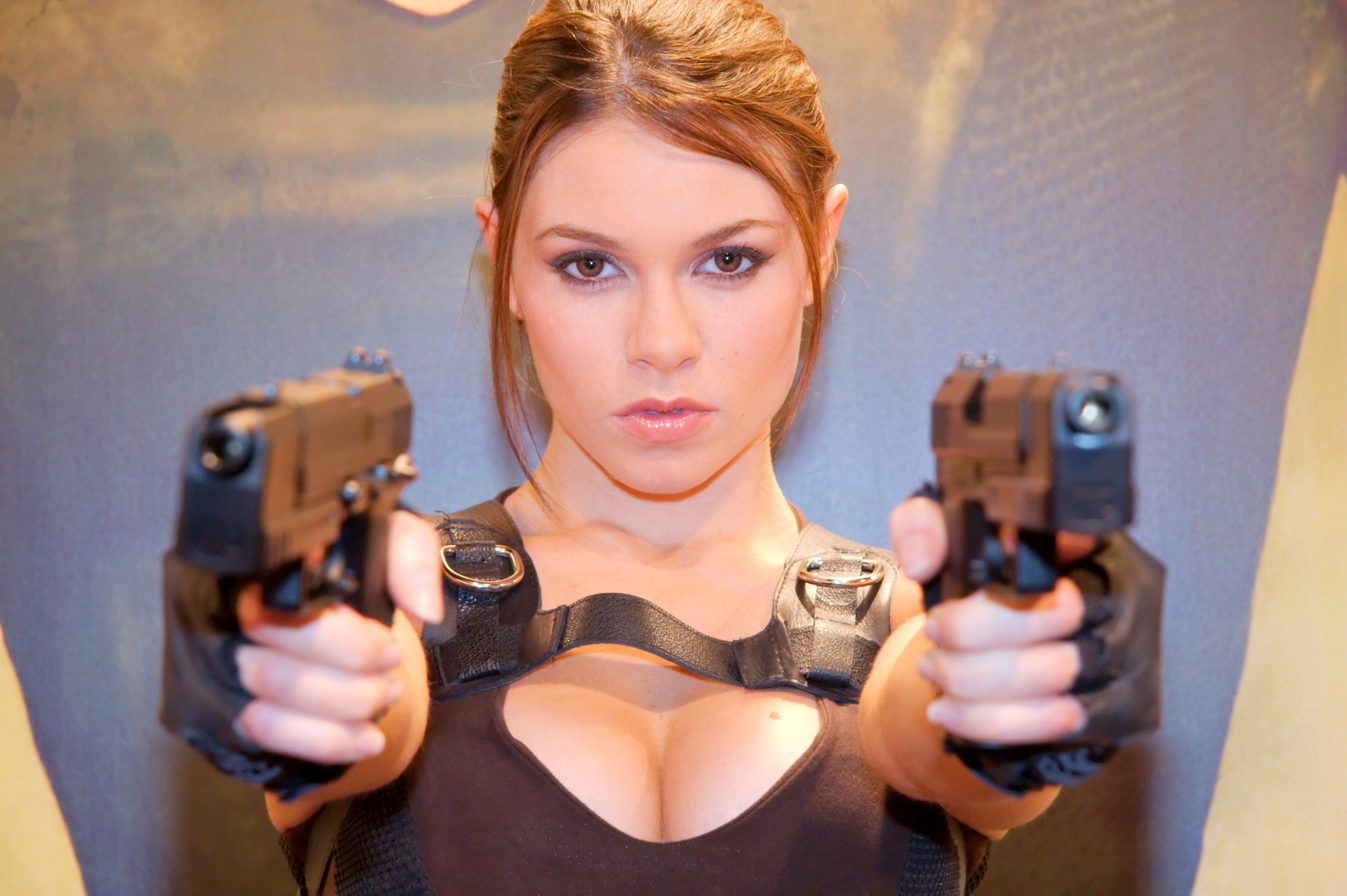
Alison Carroll as Lara Croft at the Paris Game Festival 2008

"Spokesmodel" is a term used for a model who is employed to be associated with a specific brand or product in advertisements. A spokesmodel may be a celebrity used only in advertisements (in contrast to a "brand ambassador", who is also expected to represent the company at various events), but often the term refers to a model who is not a celebrity in their own right. A classic example of such spokesmodels are the models engaged to be the Marlboro Man between 1954 and 1999, and the Clarion Girl since 1975. Contrary to what the term suggests, a spokesmodel is normally not expected to verbally promote the brand. In Japan, they are known as campaign girls (キャンペーンガール) or image girls (イメージガール) and are hired by government agencies.

=== Trade show model ===
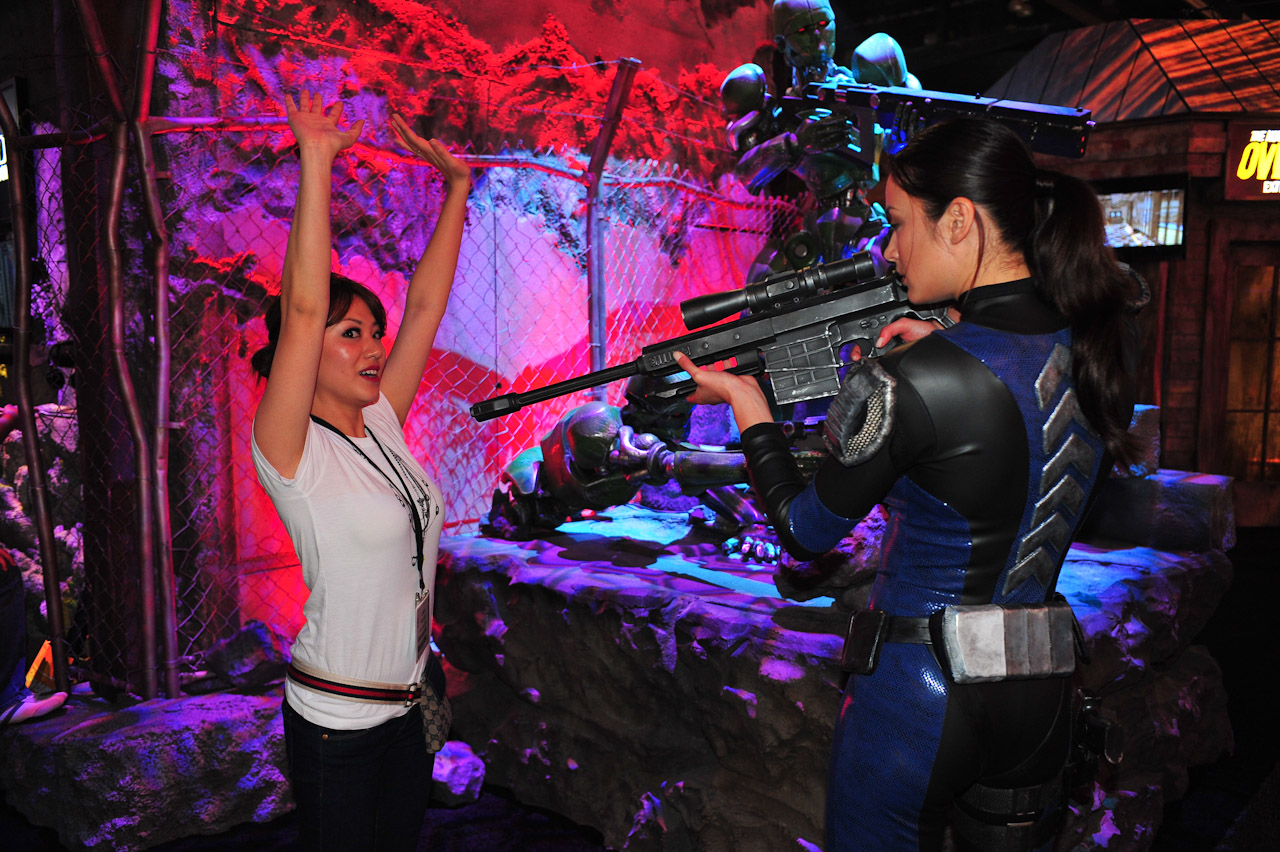
A booth model dressed as a video game character poses with a visitor.

A trade show model (also known as a convention model, trade show hostess, booth companion, or booth professional; a term that has been used only in Japan is companion lady but today more often used is event companion (イベントコンパニオン)) is an assistant that works with a company's sales representatives at a trade show exhibit, working on the floor space or a booth, and representing a company to attendees. Such models are used to draw in attendees and can provide them with basic information about product or services, and may be used to distribute marketing materials or gather customer information for future promotions. Attire and expected interactions vary depend on the nature of the show and on the image the company would like to portray, and they sometimes wear wardrobe that is particular to the company, product, or service represented.

Trade show models are typically not regular employees of the company, but are hired as they make a company's booth more visibly distinguishable from other booths with which it competes for attendee attention. If needed, they can explain or disseminate information on the company and its product and service, and can assist a company in handling a large number of attendees which the company might otherwise not have enough employees to accommodate, therefore increasing the number of sales or leads resulting from participation in the show. The models can be skilled at drawing attendees into the booth, engaging them in conversation, and at spurring interest in the product, service, or company.

== Controversies ==
=== Trade shows ===
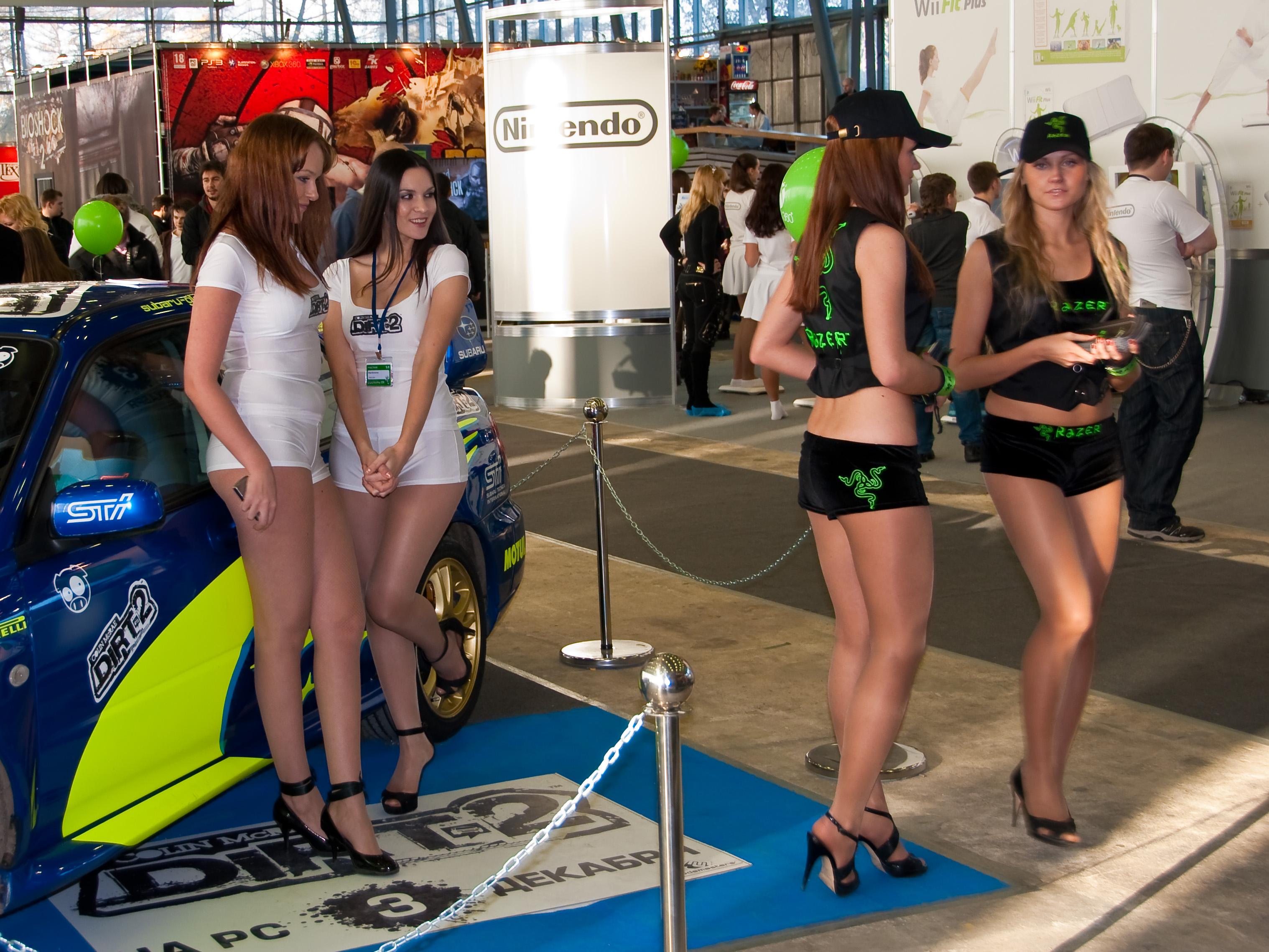
Models promoting video game software and hardware at IgroMir 2009

The slang term booth babe, coined in 1986, or booth bunny, coined in 1989, is widely used to refer to any female trade show model. The models are typically asked to pose for photographs with convention goers, but inappropriate attendee conduct sometimes occurs, such as in case of Electronic Arts' 2009 "Sin to Win" campaign to promote Dante's Inferno. Since the late 1990s and increasingly so, the practice of employing them has been, controversially, strongly criticized by some journalists and segments of video game industry and consumer electronics communities. Critics of "booth babes" declared it a sexist problem, describing the practice as "outdated", sexually objectifying and demeaning, as well as insulting to and alienating other women, in particular those in the information technology industry. In turn, some others argue that the models and companies are being unfairly targeted, accusing the critics of finger-pointing sensationalism, displaying "extreme" political correctness, being prudish and pro-censorship, and spreading a Puritan-like moral panic.

The moniker "booth babe" is also controversial itself as it is considered offensive and degrading by some, including trade show models themselves. The term nevertheless continues to be often used by journalists and by the people opposed to the presence of the models they define as "booth babes".

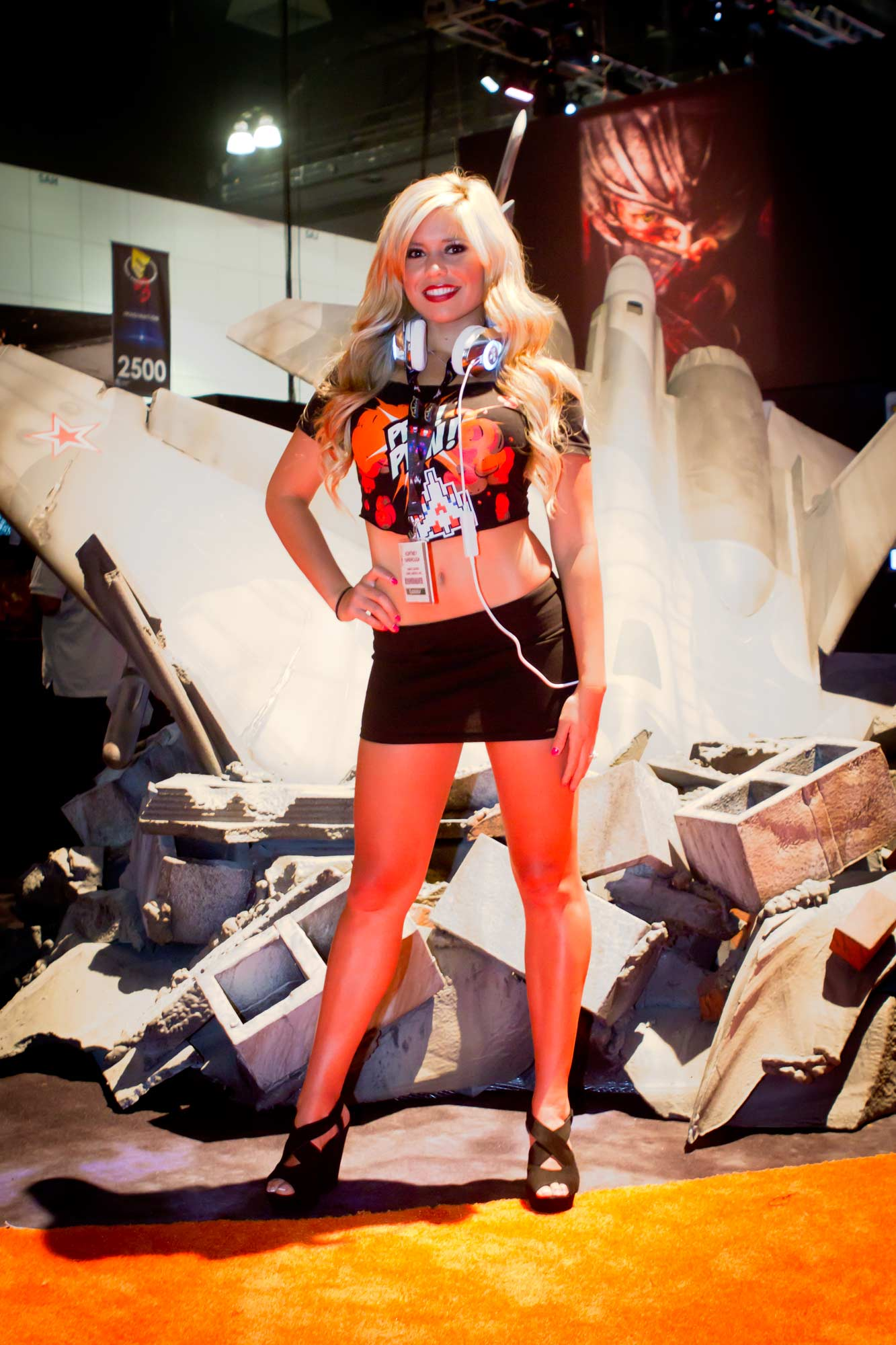
A model at the E3 2011

Changing social and business standards have resulted in a decrease in the use of promotional models in trade shows, especially in the United States. The largest video gaming business convention, Electronic Entertainment Expo (E3), attempted to ban "conduct that is sexually explicit and/or sexually provocative" in 2006 following Agetec's 2005 "Anti Booth Babe" protest, but reversed on this stance in 2009, after complaints regarding this and other policy changes. GameSpot's Greg Kasavin commented that, with this attempt, the Entertainment Software Association (ESA) was "trying to put a definition to what constitutes scantily clad and what's borderline offensive" as it was "under a lot of pressure these days to clean up the image of games and to at least demonstrate that the video game industry is responsible in regulating itself" in the aftermath of Hot Coffee mod controversy.

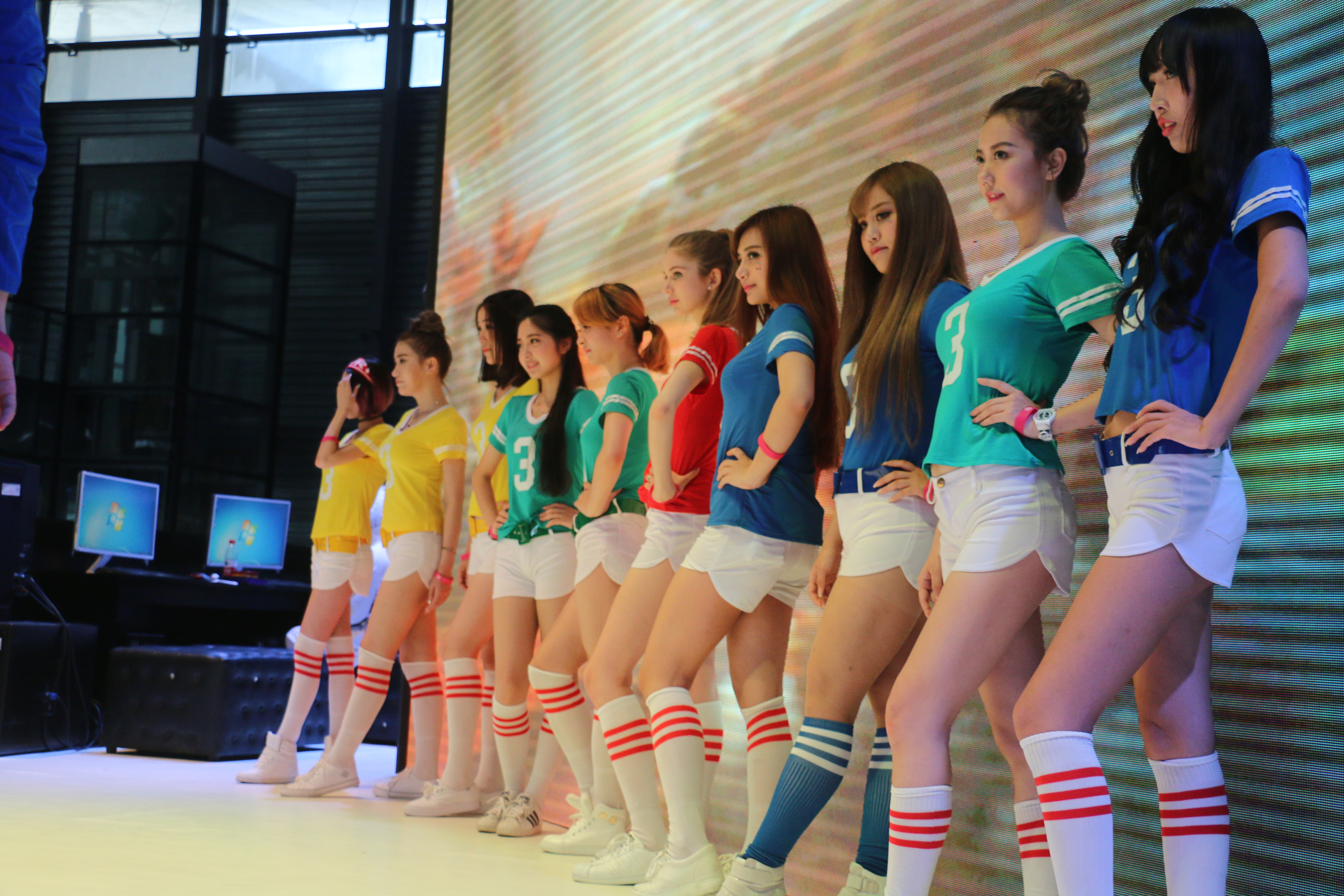
Models at the 2015 ChinaJoy

China Digital Entertainment Expo & Conference (ChinaJoy) introduced and strictly enforced a dress code in 2012, saying they did not want "to send the wrong message" to their adolescent primary audience, and San Diego Comic-Con banned the SuicideGirls erotic models from having a booth in 2010. Video game convention Penny Arcade Expo (PAX) adopted a dress codes for both male and female models in what they call a "no booth babes" policy guideline, where "booth babes are defined as staff of ANY gender used by exhibitors to promote their products at PAX by using overtly sexual or suggestive methods. Partial nudity, the aggressive display of cleavage and the navel, and shorts/skirts higher than 4” above the knee are not allowed." Eurogamer Expo disallowed them completely in 2012, saying they wanted to make a more "friendly" show and all visitors "to feel comfortable," with a formal guideline saying "Booth babes are Not OK."

The Consumer Electronics Association (CEA), including its president and CEO Gary J. Shapiro and senior vice-president Karen Chupka, initially defended the use of female models who were deemed not dressed enough by critics but discouraged the practice in 2014 after a Change.org petition started by a Forbes technology journalist Connie Guglielmo demanded a ban on them and reached 250 signatures. The campaigners' proposal to "ban booth babes" was rejected as the CEA refused to "create and impose arbitrary or unenforceable rules, or worse, inch our event towards a Talibanesque ban on exposure of skin," but the new Consumer Electronics Show (CES) exhibitor guidelines stated, "recent news articles show that ‘booth babes’ can reflect poorly on your exhibit, so we ask that you give this thoughtful consideration, to avoid alienating or offending various audience segments."

In 2015, tube tops were among the items banned for booth staff at the RSA Conference, a major trade show/conference association, as part of dress codes that also informed booth staff not to wear minidresses or skintight bodysuits. The previous practice of having barely-clothed booth staffers was seen as creating a culture in which women were seen as "eye-candy or as decorative objects or hypersexualized figures".

=== Sports ===
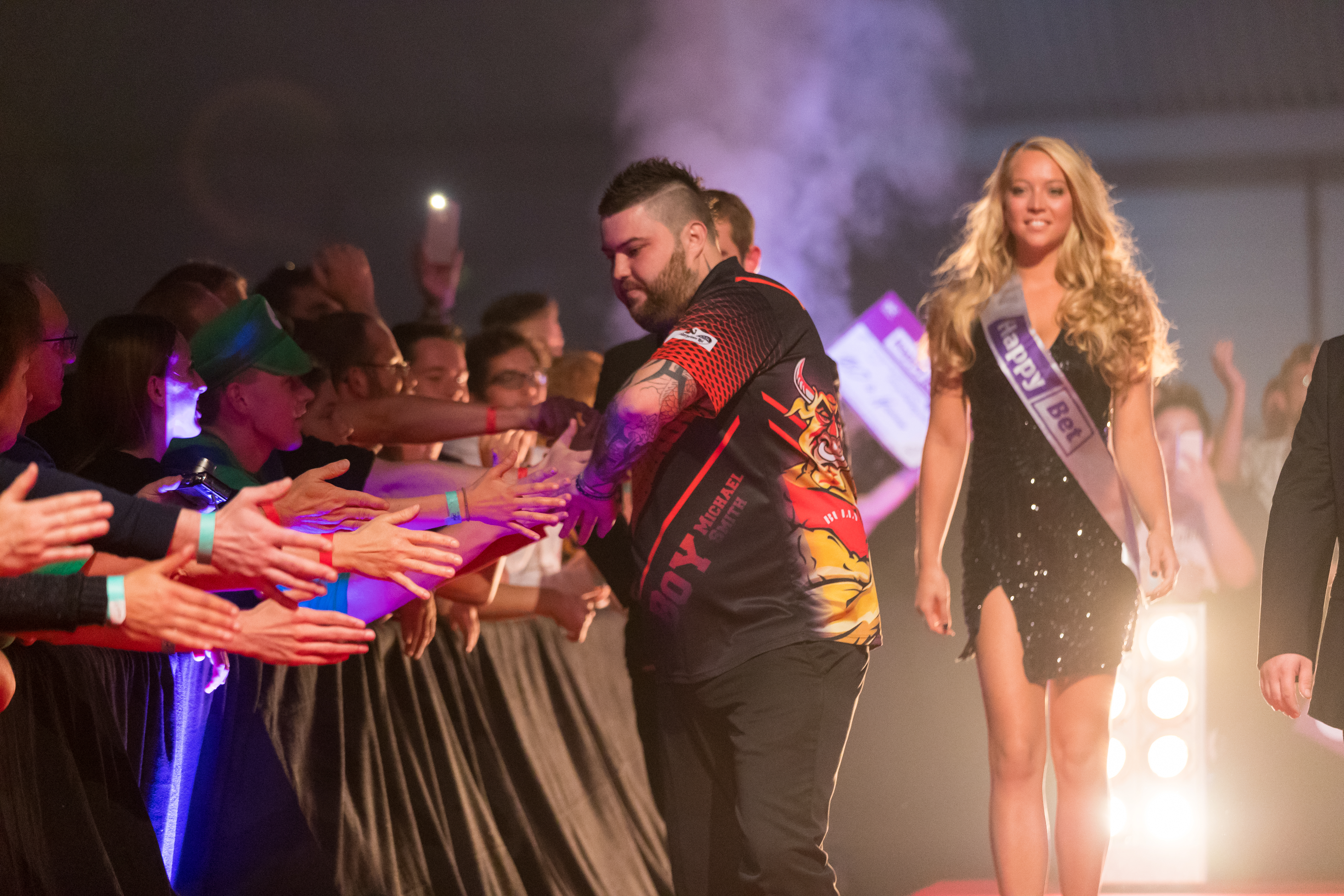
A walk-on girl guiding darter Michael Smith to the stage at the 2017 German Darts Grand Prix

After a round of talks with broadcasters, the Professional Darts Corporation announced on 27 January 2018 that it would discontinue the use of walk-on girls in darts tournaments. The decision has encountered a backlash from some fans, players and models.

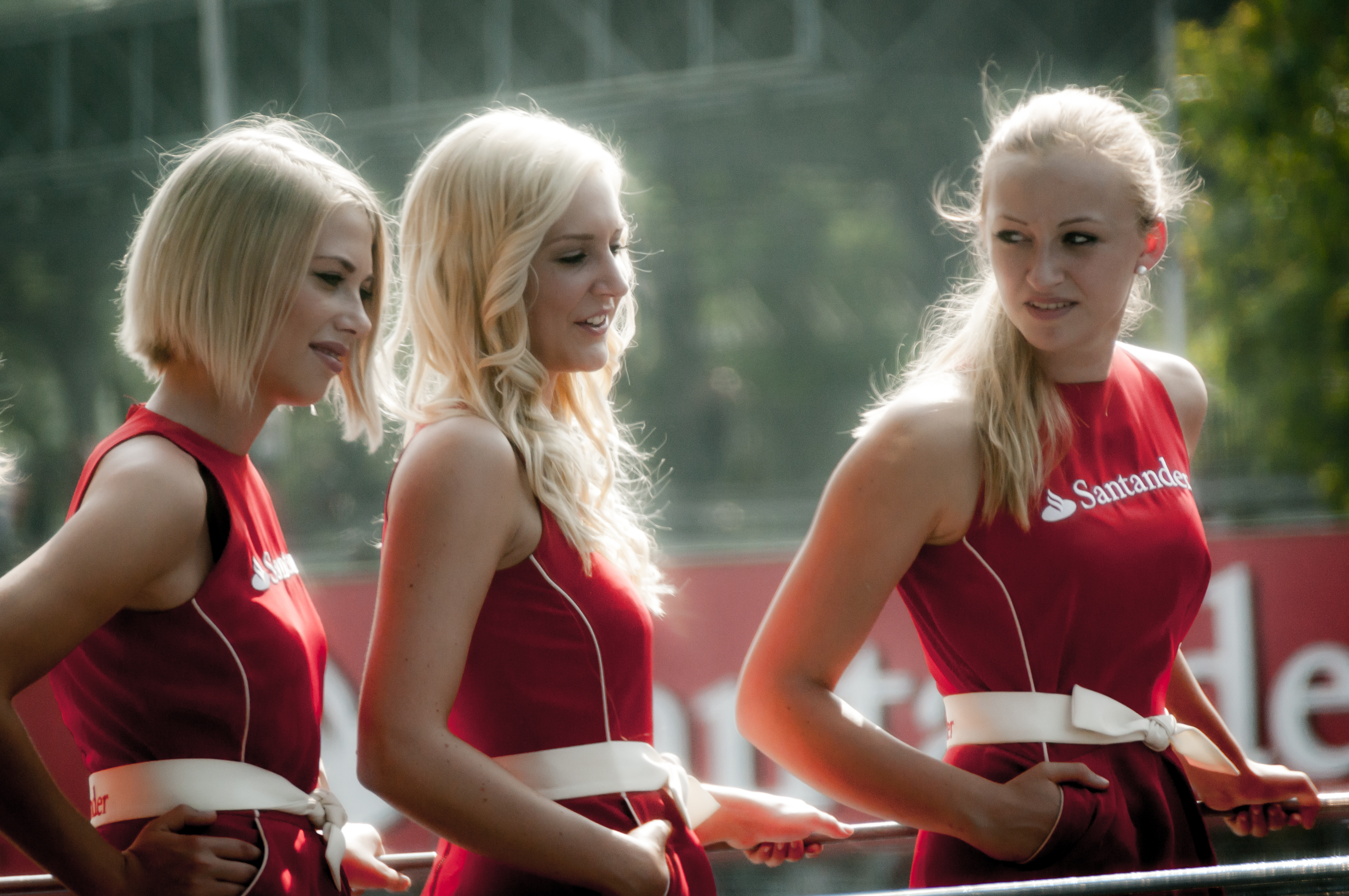
At the 2012 Italian Grand Prix

On 31 January 2018, Formula One management announced that it would end the practice of grid girls who accompany the racers to the track, a tradition that "has been a staple of Formula 1 Grands Prix for decades", stating that "[they] feel this custom does not resonate with [their] brand values and clearly is at odds with modern day societal norms." The move has drawn criticism from former grid girls, including British model Kelly Brook. Former F1 executive Bernie Ecclestone and Red Bull Racing leader Christian Horner also expressed disapproval. In February 2018, Formula 1 announced it intended to replace grid girls with a new program called grid kids that season. The children used would be competitors in karting or junior categories, chosen by national motorsport authorities.

In a similar move, the traditional podium girls of cycling's Tour de France were removed and replaced with one male and one female host starting with the 2020 Tour de France.

== See also ==
- Celebrity branding
- National Football League Cheerleading
- Cosplay
- Influencer marketing
- Maid café
- Podium girl
- Pseudo-model
- Ring girl
- Video vixen
