= Elin Grindemyr =

Swedish model (born 1983)

- Born: Elin Karolina Grindemyr; 7 February 1983 (age 43); Norrköping, Sweden
- Modelling information
- Height: 1.68 m (5 ft 6 in)
- Hair colour: Brown
- Eye colour: Hazel

Elin Karolina Grindemyr (born 7 February 1983) is a Swedish model. Her first appearance was in the Swedish men's magazine Slitz in the September 2003 issue as a contender for "Annual Sexiest Girlfriend". Despite the fact that she did not win this contest, she has appeared in Slitz several times thereafter.

In May 2005, Grindemyr was voted as the sexiest woman in Sweden by the readers of Slitz.
