= Podium girl =

Type of host at cycle races

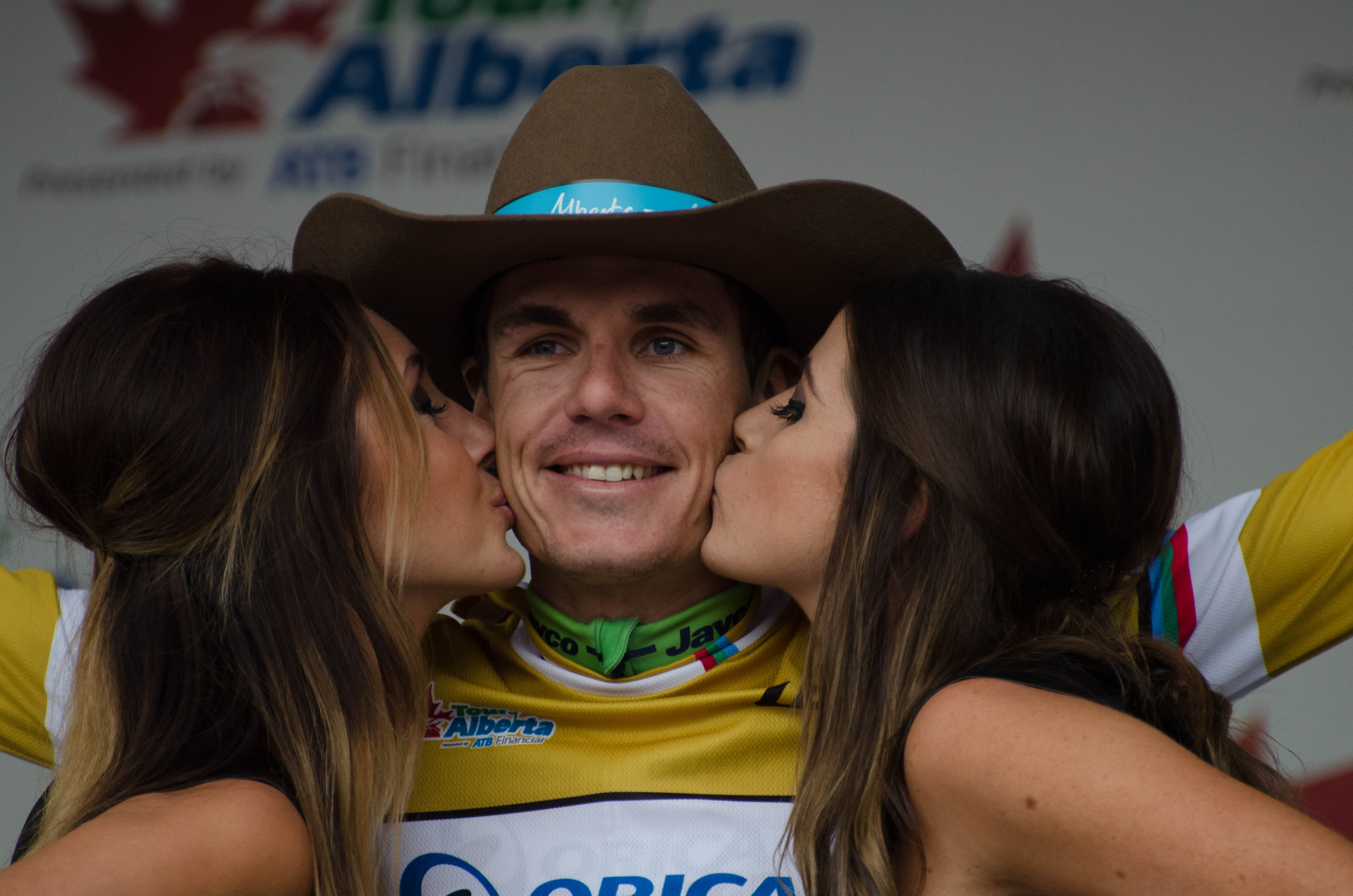
Podium girls kissing stage and general classification winner Daryl Impey at the 2014 Tour of Alberta

Podium girls, formally known as "tour hostesses" (French: hôtesses du Tour), are women who are best known for presenting prizes and kisses to the winners of the Tour de France and other major cycle races, including the Giro d'Italia and Vuelta a España. In the Tour de France, a team of four podium girls is employed by the race's main sponsor, the French bank LCL S.A. They are responsible for entertaining clients of the sponsors before the morning departure of the race and in parties after the end of the race, but their most visible and prestigious role is in the award ceremony at the close of each day's racing. The job requires working long hours in all weather conditions but is well-paid and sought-after, with candidates selected on the basis of their looks, endurance, personalities, and linguistic abilities. Although they are forbidden to interact with the riders, other than kissing them in the award ceremonies, several podium girls have ended up marrying cyclists.

The employment of podium girls has prompted a certain amount of criticism about sexism in professional cycling, though current and former podium girls have defended their role as part of the sport's traditions. In 2020, the Tour de France no longer has podium girls; instead, one male and one female host carry out the prize presentations.

== Role ==
The women work as ambassadors for the race's sponsors, serving drinks and snacks to clients and VIPs in the morning, presenting prizes in the afternoon and hosting parties in the evening. According to one Tour de France podium girl, Anne-Marie, "we start every day between 6 am and 7 am. We're present in the 'departure village' at the LCL stand to attend the departure of the caravan and the race." During the awards ceremony at the end of each stage, two of the women, working in pairs on alternate days, present the winning riders with their jerseys and prizes and give them a kiss on the cheek. In the evening, says Anne-Marie, "we often host parties for LCL with gifts to win."

The most prestigious part of a podium girl's Tour is the final presentation ceremony in Paris, which is seen worldwide in photographs and on television. However, only two of the four women get to carry out the ceremony. According to Sophie Moressee-Pichot of LCL, the decision on which women to select comes down to "who will photograph the best on that day, and some women might have a pimple or might look tired in the eyes."

== Selection criteria ==
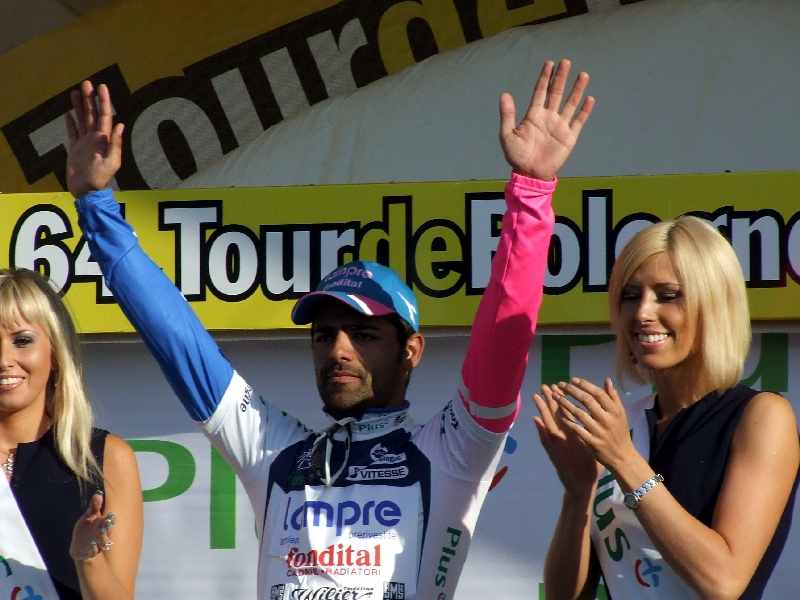
Danilo Napolitano is applauded by the podium girls on the 2007 Tour of Poland

Podium girls were originally selected from the population of the town where each day's finishing stage was held, and the only requirements were for them to be under 30 and about the same height as each other. Today, they are selected from applications put forward by modelling agencies or individual applicants. The women are chosen by the sponsors of the four coloured racing jerseys (yellow, green, polka dot, and white) awarded to those leading in particular categories. Although the hours are long – often over 12 hours per day and in all weather conditions – the job is well-paid, at a rate of about €1,000–2,000 for three weeks' work, and food and accommodation are provided.

The women are selected not just for their looks, but for their endurance, personality and linguistic abilities as well. Many are students; in the 2009 Tour de France, three of the four podium girls were students. One woman, Elisabeth Petzl, was a doctoral candidate in political science who could speak four languages. Laura Antoine, a former showgirl from Paris who worked as a podium girl in the 2010 Tour de France, was chosen because of "her upbeat personality, her willingness to work long hours without complaint and her ability to speak French and English". According to Laura, "They asked me if I could share a bathroom with two other girls for a month and if I could drive a car up a mountain if I needed to. Then they asked me about my endurance level and if I could smile even if I’m tired. And I said I could work all day, with a smile. I quickly realized that hey, this isn’t as glamorous as I thought it was."

== Relationship with the riders ==
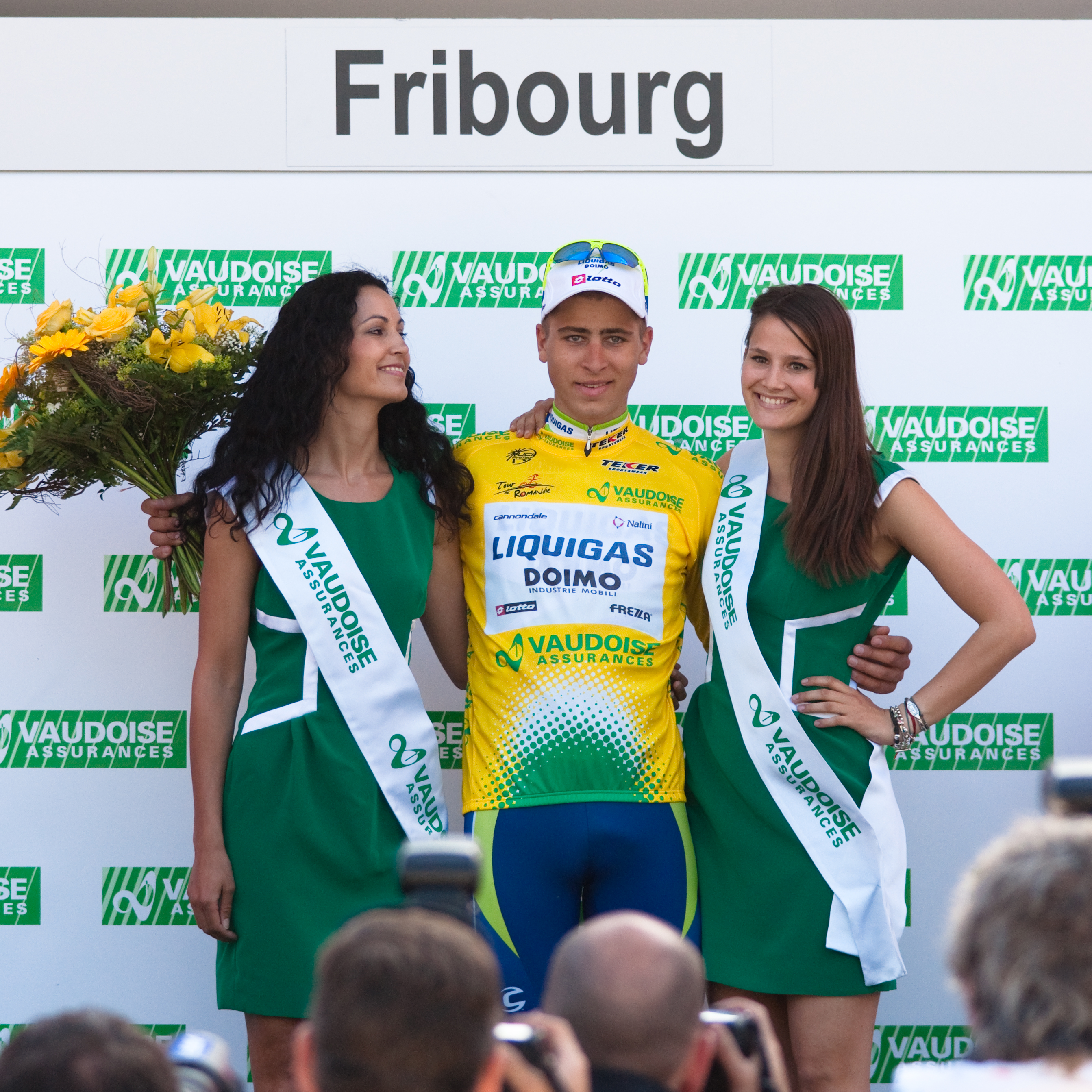
Peter Sagan embraces two podium girls on the 2010 Tour de Romandie

The podium girls are only allowed very limited interaction with the riders; they can present prizes and jerseys, help the riders put the jerseys on, and kiss the riders on their cheeks, but are not allowed to talk with them. Transgressions are a disciplinary offence for both sides; during the 2003 Tour de France, one of the podium girls, Melanie Simonneau, was dismissed for accepting a note from rider George Hincapie, while in April 2013, Slovak cyclist Peter Sagan videoed an apology after he pinched the buttocks of Tour of Flanders podium girl Maya Leye during an awards ceremony.

Following Simonneau's departure from the Tour, she eventually married Hincapie, and now has three children with him. Hincapie admits that he "pretty much ended up chasing her throughout the entire Tour de France," though she told him that she was "totally not allowed to talk to you." Nonetheless, they began exchanging text messages and meeting in the departure villages before she was given an ultimatum to choose Hincapie or the job. She chose Hincapie, left the Tour three days before the finish, and now says that it was "the best thing I ever did." Another podium girl, Laura Leturgie from Bethune, married Belgian rider Gert Steegmans after the 2007 Tour de France. According to the German cyclist Jens Voigt, they are not the only podium girls who have married riders: "I could name 10 off the top of my head."

== Controversy ==
Although podium girls are a long-standing tradition in European cycle racing, they have attracted some controversy. Laura Weislo of Cyclingnews.com has criticised the way that professional cycling has reduced women to "just beautiful ornaments to stand beside successful men". She comments that "the only time that you see a female presence on television in professional cycling is the models on the podium, and it only heightens the inequality in the sport." Kelly Riordan, a former cyclo-cross podium girl who now works as a journalist, rejects this: "It wouldn't be a proper ceremony without them. These are talented women in their own right. They shouldn't be dismissed simply as eye candy." Magalie Thierry, who has worked as a Tour de France podium girl in 2012 and 2013, describes the podium as "just 'a plus'". Maybe the ceremony could seem out of date, but most of the public loves it. I think podium girls give a little touch of femininity to this sport."

While acknowledging that the Tour de France is very male-dominated – there were no Women's Tours before 2022 – Tour director Christian Prudhomme has said that he is trying to bring women into the management of the Tour. For the 2009 Tour, he selected champion cyclist Claire Pedrono to ride pillion on a motorcycle ahead of the riders, holding up the tour blackboard to give them time information. It is regarded as a prestigious role, and Prudhomme says that he gave it to Pedrono "because of her accomplishments as a cyclist. But I have to be honest with you, it also doesn’t hurt that she has a nice smile."

== Decline ==
The Vuelta a España stopped using podium girls in 2017.

Beginning with the 2020 edition of the race, the role of podium girl was removed from the Tour de France. Instead, one male and one female host present the prizes. This decision was attributed to the sexism of viewing women as "objects or rewards", but also to the need to reduce the number of people on the podium and the physical contact of cheek kissing as a social distancing measure during the COVID-19 pandemic.

== See also ==
- Cheerleading
- Cue card girl
- Promotional model
- Ring girl
