= Copycat Singers =

2011 Swedish television game show

- Presented by: Lina Hedlund
- Country of origin: Sweden
- Original language: Swedish
- No. of seasons: 1
- No. of episodes: 8

Production
- Running time: 45–50 minutes
- Production company: Mastiff

Original release
- Release: 2011

Copycat Singers was a Swedish musical gameshow broadcast by TV3 in late 2011. In each episode, a featured well-known Swedish singer competed alongside five “copycats” whose goal was to imitate that artist’s voice as closely as possible. A series of rounds and jury decisions determined which performers sounded most like the original singer, with the copycats aiming to match their idol’s vocal style. The show ran for one season of eight episodes and included appearances by artists such as Lasse Berghagen, Pernilla Wahlgren, Nanne Grönvall, Markoolio, Tommy Nilsson, Caroline af Ugglas, Christer Sandelin and Shirley Clamp.

It followed a competitive but light-hearted format that emphasized vocal resemblance rather than originality. Contestants were evaluated on tone, phrasing, accent, and performance mannerisms, aiming to convincingly replicate the featured artist’s singing style. A panel of judges, along with the original singer, assessed performances across multiple elimination rounds, gradually narrowing the field. The program highlighted the technical difficulty of vocal imitation and offered insight into each artist’s distinctive traits. While primarily entertainment-focused, the show also functioned as a showcase for skilled tribute performers.

It received modest attention in Sweden and was not renewed beyond its initial season.
