= Hawaiian Tropic =

American brand of suntan lotion

- Product type: Sunscreen
- Current owner: Edgewell Personal Care
- Country: United States
- Introduced: 1969; 57 years ago
- Previous owners: Playtex
- Registered as a trademark in: U.S., Canada
- Website: hawaiiantropic.com

Hawaiian Tropic is an American brand of suntan lotion that was founded by Ron Rice in 1969. Hawaiian Tropic became the largest private manufacturer of sun care products in the United States. The company was acquired by Playtex Products, Inc. in May 2007. With Hawaiian Tropic and Playtex's Banana Boat brand, Playtex became the largest manufacturer of sun care products in the Western Hemisphere. Shortly after purchasing Hawaiian Tropic, Playtex Products was purchased by Energizer Holdings Inc. in a deal valued at $1.9 billion. Hawaiian Tropic is one of several brands that became part of Edgewell Personal Care, when the company was spun-off from Energizer Holdings.

== Miss Hawaiian Tropic International ==
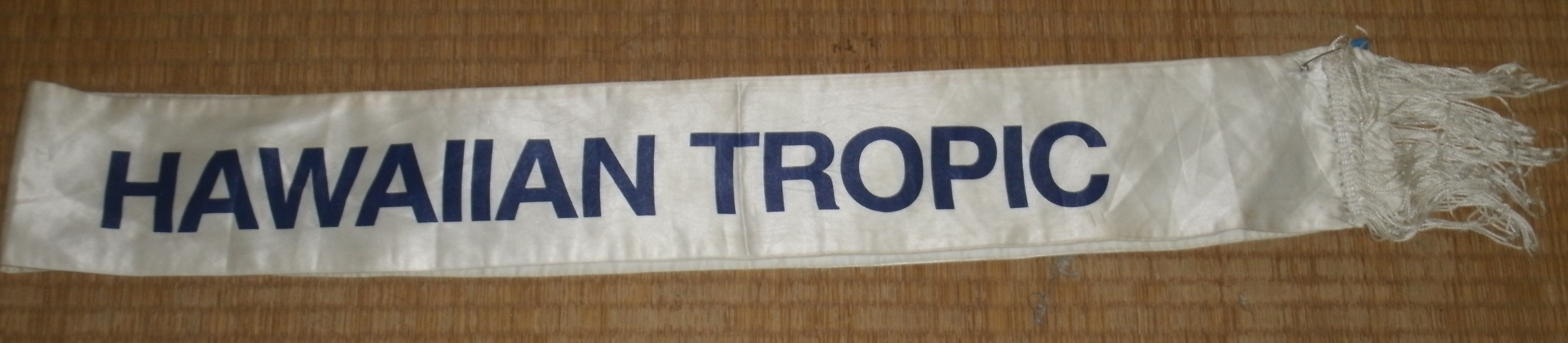
Sashes is Miss Hawaiian Tropic

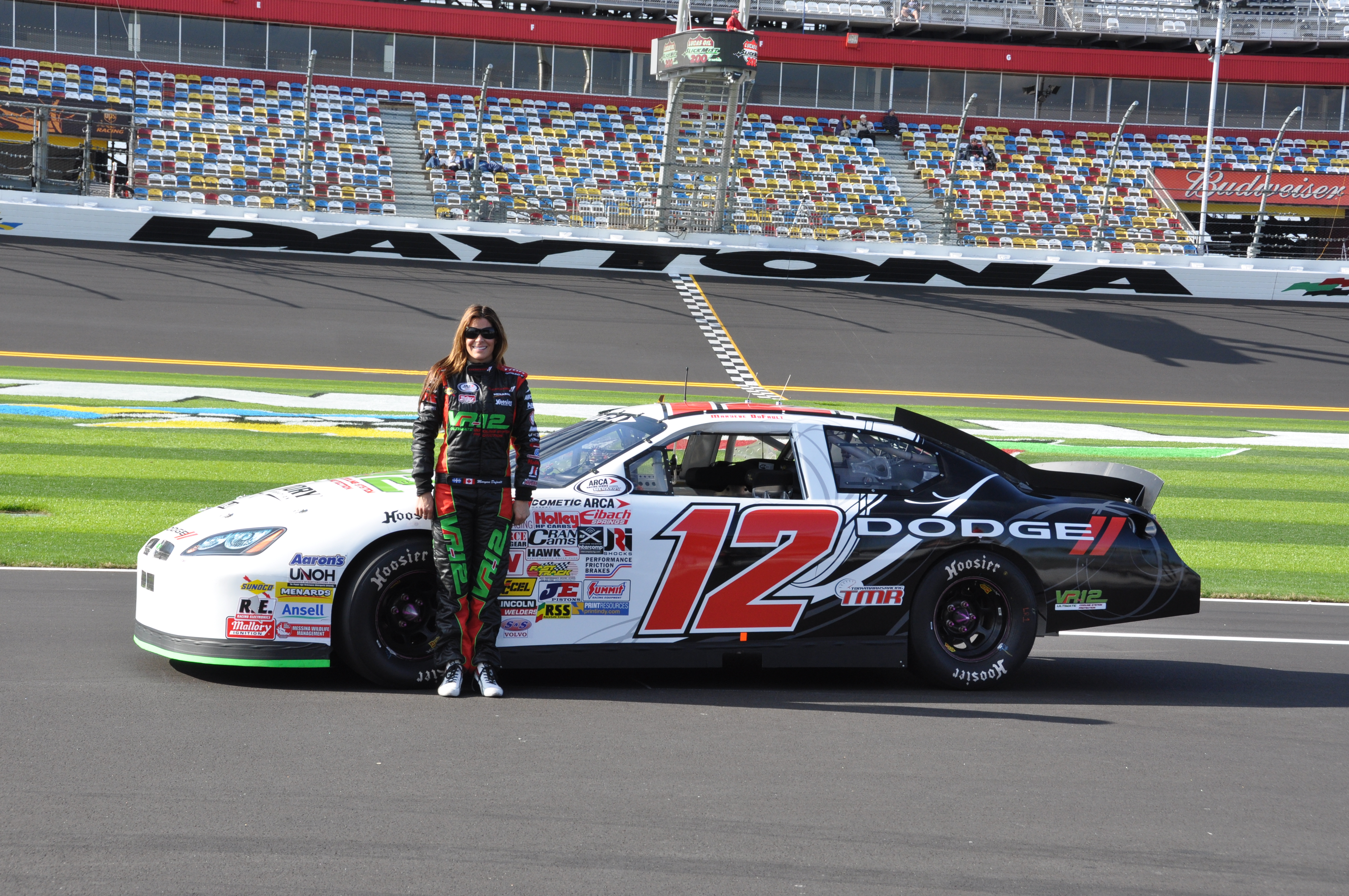
Maryeve Dufault before she raced in a stock car race

Hawaiian Tropic sponsored swimsuit competitions among women to select spokesmodels for its products. Many winners appeared later in advertising campaigns, swimwear, erotic magazines, and lingerie catalogs.

In May 2008, the Hawaiian Tropic Brand celebrated the 25th annual Miss Hawaiian Tropic International model search finals at the Golden Nugget Hotel and Casino in Las Vegas. In late 2008, the pageants ended in the United States. The former state directors transitioned to Swimsuit USA, which is the official successor.

| Year | Winner | Origin | Country |
|---|---|---|---|
| 1984 | Cecilia Hörberg | Gothenburg | Sweden |
| 1985 | Karen Frances McGrillen | Belfast | Ireland |
| 1986 | Yvonne Balliache | Caracas | Venezuela |
| 1987 | Monica Lange | Alberta | Canada |
| 1988 | Varinia Govea | Montevideo | Uruguay |
| 1989 | Jennifer Lynn Campbell | Michigan | United States |
| 1990 | Sandi Da Silva | Florida | United States |
| 1991 | Scarlett Chorvat | Michigan | United States |
| 1992 | Monica Buck | Texas | United States |
| 1993 | Jennifer Blair | Arizona | United States |
| 1994 | Tracy Wood | Ontario | Canada |
| 1995 | Krista Frazier | Texas | United States |
| 1996 | Cheryl Depew | Florida | United States |
| 1997 | Renee Slaughter | Florida | United States |
| 1998 | Jennifer England | Michigan | United States |
| 1999 | Charlotte Arlt | Texas | United States |
| 2000 | Maryeve Dufault | Quebec | Canada |
| 2001 | Erika Johnson | Stockholm | Sweden |
| 2002 | Shawn Cox | California | United States |
| 2003 | Erica Reams | Cockburn Town | Turks & Caicos |
| 2004 | Ashley Smith | Florida | United States |
| 2005 | Charmain Espinosa | Panamá City | Panama |
| 2006 | Kristen Achee | Texas | United States |
| 2007 | Anna Naroznaja | Tallinn | Estonia |
| 2008 | Debbie O'Toole | Liverpool | United Kingdom |
| 2010 | Amanda Hinchcliffe | Gold Coast | Australia |

=== Notable winners ===
==== Miss Hawaiian Tropic USA ====
- Rebecca DiPietro 2005: Former World Wrestling Entertainment backstage interviewer on ECW and Playboy model; finalist in Hawaiian Tropic International 2005 pageant
- Shana Hiatt 1995: Hostess for the World Poker Tour and Playboy model
- Ashley Massaro 2002: Former WWE Diva and Playboy cover girl
- Crista Nicole 2001: Playboy Playmate of the Month for May 2001
- Brooke Richards 1998: Playboy Playmate of the Month for December 1999
- Suzanne Stokes 1999: Playboy Playmate of the Month for February 2000

==== Miss Hawaiian Tropic Canada ====
- Ashley Massaro 2004: Former WWE Diva and Playboy cover girl
- Maryse Ouellet 2003: WWE Diva and Playboy model
- Crystel Geoffré 2005

==== Miss Hawaiian Tropic International ====
- Cecilia Hörberg 1984: Top 10 at Miss World 1988, representing Sweden
- Jennifer Campbell 1989: actress and model
- XiXi Yang Miss China 2008: international spokesmodel, U.S. media personality/TV host; appeared in MTV, VH1, and NBC

==== Hawaiian Tropic Teen Miss ====
- Casey Reinhardt 2003: former cast member of the second season of Laguna Beach and frequent beauty pageant contestant

==== Other contestants and winners ====
- Gia Allemand: reality television contestant and actress who also appeared in Maxim
- Anna Anka, (née Åberg) Sweden, Top 10 1993: model, actress, author. Married to the musician Paul Anka
- Marea Lambert-Barker Australia: actress, TV host, radio announcer, model
- Brooke Adams, former ECW performer
- Martina Andrews, Miss Hooters International 2004
- Michelle Banzer: Miss Kentucky USA 2007
- Laura Morgan Porter: Miss Tennessee Hawaiian Tropic 2006, 2003 Sports Illustrated Swimsuit Cover finalist, one of the three official NASCAR Pit Crew girls from 2009 to 2011
- Jillian Beyor: Playboy Cyber Girl, Cyber Girl of Month May 2007, Cyber Girl of Week January 1, 2007, and Coed of Month October 2006
- Barbara Blank: 2005 model; WWE diva under the ring name Kelly Kelly
- Jennifer Etcheson: Miss Hawaiian Tropic California 2005, Miss Hawaiian Tropic International Finalist 2005, Strikeforce MMA Ring Girl, model and actress
- Angel Boris: actress and Playboy Playmate of the Month for July 1996
- Jennifer Cole: actress and model
- Bonnie Conte was Miss Miami Beach Hawaiian Tropic
- Louise Glover: former Playboy Special Editions "Model of the Year"
- Sandra Hubby: Playboy Playmate of the Month for March 2004
- Dalene Kurtis: Playboy Playmate of the Month for September 2001 and one of People magazine's 50 most beautiful people in 2004
- Sung Hi Lee: actress and very popular Playboy Special Editions model, featured in Playboy magazine's "Girls of Hawaiian Tropic" issue in 1995 and the companion video
- Rochelle Loewen: former WWE diva and Playboy model; made cameo appearances on The Girls Next Door
- Tilsa Lozano: Miss Playboy TV Latinoamerica & Iberia 2008, Playboy TV actress
- Cassandra Lynn: Playboy Playmate of the Month for February 2006
- Holly Madison: Playboy model and Hugh Hefner's former #1 girlfriend
- Marla Maples:
- Yael Markovich: Miss International Israel 2012 and Miss Supranational Israel
- Kalin Olson: Playboy Playmate of the Month for August 1997
- Jocelyn Oxlade: model, singer, host, FHM Babe (Philippines); turned down a Playboy magazine offer worth $25,000 due to some personal reasons
- Kirsten Price: nude model, contestant of the reality program My Bare Lady, porn star
- Tiffany Selby: model and member of the USA National Bikini Team
- Andrea Stelzer
- Tiffany Taylor: Playboy Playmate of the Month for November 1998
- Jennifer Thomas: Washington's finalist in the Miss Hawaiian Tropic USA competition in 2000; professional wrestler
- Jamie Westenhiser: Playboy Playmate of the Month for May 2005
- Hope Tyler: Actor, Model, Executive Producer, Playboy Book of Lingerie March/April 1999, Playboy Book of Lingerie May/June 2000

=== Competition hosts ===
| Year | Hosts (s) |
|---|---|
| 1986 | Cathy Lee Crosby and John Davidson |
