= Magnus Hedman =

Swedish footballer

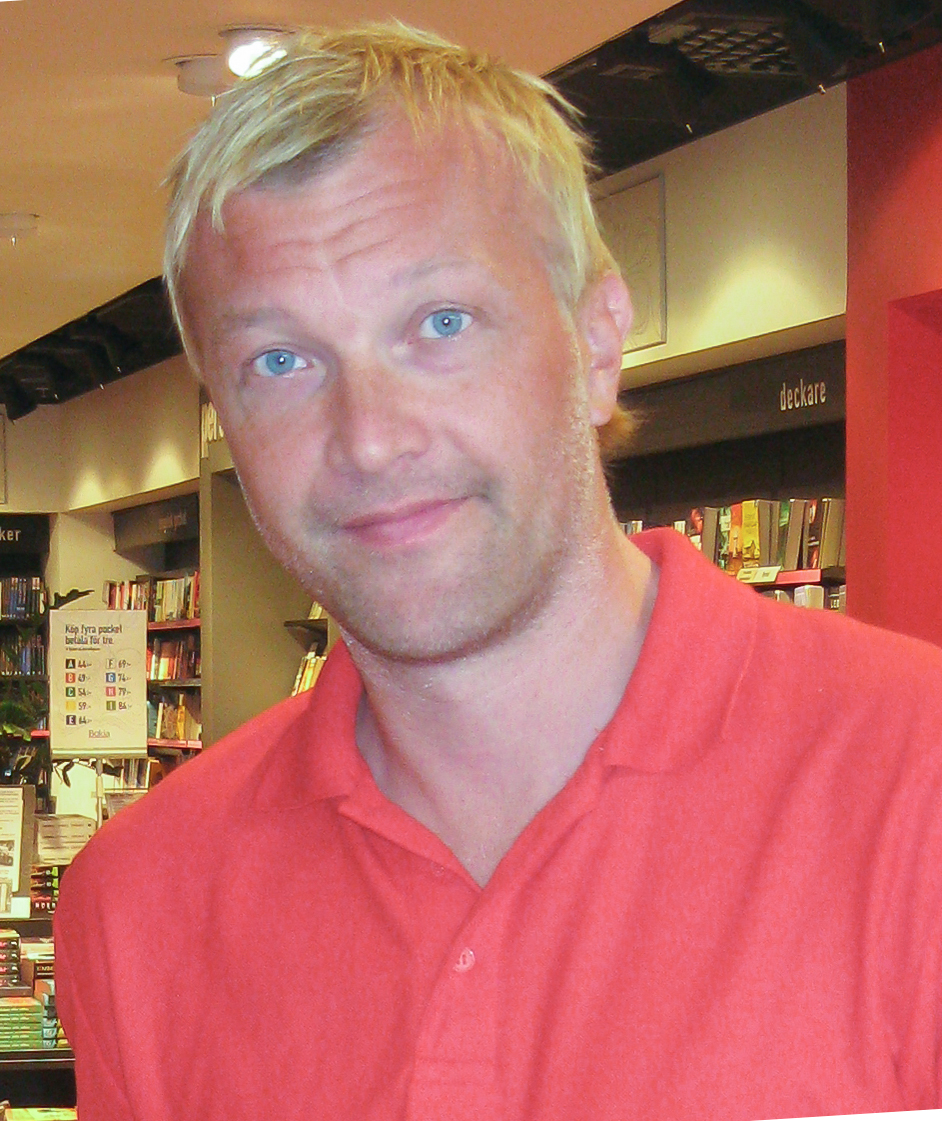
- Hedman signing books in 2012

Personal information
- Full name: Magnus Carl Hedman
- Date of birth: 19 March 1973 (age 53)
- Place of birth: Huddinge, Sweden
- Height: 1.96 m (6 ft 5 in)
- Position: Goalkeeper

Youth career
- 1978–1982: Vårby Gård IF
- 1983–1987: IFK Stockholm
- 1987–1990: AIK

Senior career*
Years	Team	Apps	(Gls)
1990–1997	AIK	127	(0)
1997–2002	Coventry City	134	(0)
2002–2005	Celtic	26	(0)
2004	→ Ancona (loan)	3	(0)
2006–2007	Chelsea	0	(0)
2013	Frej	1	(0)
Total		291	(0)

International career
1988–1989	Sweden U17	10	(0)
1990–1991	Sweden U19	5	(0)
1992–1995	Sweden U21	29	(0)
1995	Sweden B	1	(0)
1997–2004	Sweden	58	(0)
Medal record
Sweden
FIFA World Cup
Bronze medal – third place	1994
- * Club domestic league appearances and goals

Magnus Carl Hedman (pronounced [ˈmǎŋːnɵs ˈhěːdman]; born 19 March 1973) is a Swedish former professional footballer who played as a goalkeeper. Beginning his career with AIK in 1990, he went on play in the English Premier League, Scottish Premier League, and Italian Serie A before retiring in 2005. He played 58 matches for the Sweden national team, and represented his country at the 1994 and 2002 FIFA World Cups, as well as UEFA Euro 2000 and 2004. He was awarded Guldbollen in 2000 as Sweden's best footballer of the year.

== Club career ==
=== Early career ===
Hedman was born in Botkyrka, and began his footballing career with Vårby Gårds IF and IFK Stockholm. He signed with AIK in 1987 and made his Allsvenskan debut for the club during the 1990 Allsvenskan season at only 17 years of age. He won the 1992 Allsvenskan championship with AIK and eventually moved abroad to play for English club Coventry City in July 1997.

=== Coventry City ===
Aged 24 on 13 December 1997, Hedman debuted in a 4–0 win over Tottenham Hotspur and only lost his place again in February due to injury. Steve Ogrizovic however was on top form on his return and kept the number 1 shirt almost to the end of the season, Hedman returned for the final three league matches. Hedman made 17 appearances in his first season at Coventry City. Hedman began the 1998-99 campaign as number 1 keeper. Now 41, Ogrizovic was restricted to just two games and Hedman made 42 appearances in all competitions.

Hedman remained number 1 in Ogrizovic's final campaign during 1999-2000. The next season saw youngster Chris Kirkland take the shirt from Hedman, but the Sky Blues were relegated from the Premier League during that campaign. Hedman regained his place following Kirkland's transfer to Liverpool after a single game of the 2001–02 season. Hedman's Coventry career came to an acrimonious conclusion towards the end of that season, when he was approached on the pitch during an away match against Preston North End on 6 April 2002 by a 'fan' who was questioning his commitment to the club.

=== Celtic, loan at Ancona, and retirement ===
In the summer 2002 Hedman moved to Celtic in the Scottish Premier League. Hedman made 36 appearances for Celtic in three years, but due to injuries he failed to make a major impact on the number 1 spot, where Rab Douglas and later David Marshall were favoured by manager Martin O'Neill.

In January 2004, he had a loan spell at Italian team Ancona in Serie A. Hedman only played in three games, and it was a time in which he later claimed to have witnessed bribery on part of his Ancona teammates. He returned to Celtic, and played against Barcelona and A.C. Milan in the Champions League group stage, before being released by the club in July 2005. He retired from professional football a month later.

=== Return to England ===
On 9 November 2006, it was announced that Hedman would join reigning Premier League champions Chelsea on a week's trial, due to Chelsea's current lack of fully fit goalkeepers except for Henrique Hilário and youth team keeper Yves Ma-Kalambay. The move was eventually completed on 14 November 2006, with Hedman taking the number 22 shirt previously worn by Eiður Guðjohnsen. At the end of the season, Hedman was released from his contract, having made no official appearances for the club.

=== Frej ===
He was the goalkeeping coach for then third-tier club Frej. On 21 June 2013, he made a one-match comeback and played 90 minutes in Frej's 3–1 victory against Selånger.

== International career ==
Hedman was chosen as a backup for first-choice keeper Thomas Ravelli in the Sweden squad at the 1994 World Cup alongside Lasse Eriksson. He debuted for the Sweden national team in February 1997, and was chosen for the Sweden squad at the Euro 2000 where he played all Sweden's matches and conceded goals from Bart Goor and Emile Mpenza against Belgium and from Luigi Di Biagio and Alessandro Del Piero against Italy (both lost 2–1). The other match, against Turkey, was 0–0 draw. He won the 2000 Guldbollen award. He also played full-time for Sweden at the 2002 World Cup. He was chosen to represent Sweden at the Euro 2004, where he served as a back-up for keeper Andreas Isaksson.

== Personal life ==
He is divorced from Magdalena Graaf, a Swedish author, former model and pop singer. The couple have two sons together, including singer Lancelot.

== Career statistics ==
=== International ===
Appearances and goals by national team and year
National team	Year	Apps	Goals
Sweden	1997	5	0
Sweden	1998	6	0
Sweden	1999	9	0
Sweden	2000	10	0
Sweden	2001	11	0
Sweden	2002	10	0
Sweden	2003	3	0
Sweden	2004	4	0
Total		58	0

== Honours ==
AIK

- Allsvenskan: 1992
- Svenska Cupen: 1995–96, 1996–97

Celtic

- Scottish Premier League: 2003–04
- Scottish Cup: 2003–04, 2004–05

Sweden

- FIFA World Cup third place: 1994

Individual

- Stor Grabb: 1999
- Guldbollen: 2000
