= Gigi Hamilton =

Swedish singer-songwriter

- Born: Gigi Hamilton; 7 May 1965 (age 61); Stockholm, Sweden
- Occupations: Singer; songwriter
- Years active: 1979–present
- Musical career
- Genres: Pop; electronic; easy listening; soft rock; adult contemporary
- Instruments: Vocals; piano
- Labels: Sound Of Scandinavia; Sire; Alpha; Warner Music Sweden
- Website: gigihamilton.se

Gigi Hamilton (born 7 May 1965) is a Swedish singer and songwriter, best known as a member of the popular Swedish pop-groups, Freestyle and later Style.

== Biography ==
Gigi's musical career started as a singer-songwriter in the Swedish 1980s pop-group called Freestyle. Her first album Fantasi with Freestyle sold Gold and platinum in a short space of time. It still remains popular in Sweden with extensive airplay on the radio; especially the singles: "Vill ha dej", "Fantasi" and "Ögon som glittrar". Freestyle's popularity led to a film role in the Swedish motion picture called G.

In 1982 she released her first solo record My Coo ca Choo. Freestyle split in 1983 due to musical differences, but in 1998 Gigi and the former members reformed for the Summer of 1998 to re-record "Fantasi" and "Ögon Som Glittrar" and to release a new compilation album. "Fantasi" became a hit once again and together they made a one-off concert in Stockholm.

When Freestyle disbanded in 1983, Gigi formed Style together with former Freestyle band members Tommy Ekman and Christer Sandelin. Style became successful in Scandinavia.

Hamilton has participated in the Swedish Melodifestivalen three times with Style. First in 1986, with their song "Dover-Calais"; although finishing third, "Dover-Calais" became a hit throughout Scandinavia, Then in 1987 with their song "Hand i hand" finishing sixth and in 2003 (reunited again after splitting in 1989 due to musical differences) with their song "Stay the Night".

Gigi released her first solo album Gigi Hamilton in 1991, with the singles: "Joy & Pain (In this Wild, Wild, Wild World", "Bitter Sweet Love", "Angels With Filthy Wings" and "How's the World Treating You"

She currently lives in London after living in Tokyo for many years. She enjoys going home to Sweden to participate in Swedish TV shows like SVTs and Så ska det låta, as well as playing nostalgia tours with both Style and as solo artist.

== Discography ==
=== Freestyle albums ===
- Fantasi (1981) No. 1
- Modiga Agenter (1982) No. 13
- 10 (1990) No. 47

=== Freestyle Compilations ===
- Freestyle's Bästa (1986)
- Guldkorn-Den Kompletta Samlingen (1998) No. 2
- Golden Hits/2CD (1998)

=== Freestyle Singles ===
- Take Me Home (1980)
- Running Away (1980)
- Vill ha dej/I Want You (1980) No. 1
- Fantasi (1981) No. 13
- Rider Omkring (1981)
- Nära Dej (1981)
- Bubblar (1981)
- Är Det Värt... (1981)
- One More Ride/Fantasy (1981)
- Ögon Som Glittrar (1982) No. 3
- Att Leka Med Känslor (1982)
- Modiga Agenter/Vill Du Ha En Del Av Min Sommar (1982) No. 13
- Mission Impossible/Hard To Handle (1982)
- Fingers in Motion (1983)
- Musiken Gör Mig Vild/Nattens Dockor (1983)
- Fantasi/10 (1991)
- C&N Medley '98/DJ Promotion (1998)
- Fantasi '98 (1998) No. 37
- Ögon Som Glittrar '98 (1998)

=== Style albums ===
- So Chic (1983) SWE No. 32
- Visioner (1985)
- Heaven No 7 (1986) SWE No. 3
- Daylight Robbery (1987) SWE No. 7
- 12 bästa (1987)
- Question of Time (1988) SWE No. 4
- Samlade hits (2003) SWE No. 7

=== Style Singles ===
- Love Is Knocking on My Door/Längtar tillbaks till dig (1983)
- Telefon (1984)
- Du och jag (1985)
- Vision av kärlek (1985)
- Telephone (1985) U.S. DANCE No. 16
- Give Me a Night to Remember/På jakt (efter guld som glimmar) (1986)
- Dover-Calais (1986) SWE No. 1
- Följ mig (1986)
- Heaven No 7 (1986)
- Shine On (1986)
- Hand i hand (1987) SWE No. 20
- Run for Your Life (1987) SWE No. 4
- Daylight Robbery (1987)
- New World (1987)
- Empty Bed (1988) SWE No. 4
- It's a Secret (1988) SWE No. 3
- Question of Time (1988)
- Sentimental (1988)
- Empty Bed (International release) (1989)
- Stay the Night (2003)

=== Solo album ===
- Gigi Hamilton – 1991

=== Solo Singles ===
- Joy &Pain (In this Wild, Wild, Wild World – 1991
- Bitter Sweet – 1991
- Angels With Filthy Wings – 1991
- How's The World Treating You – 1991
