= Freestyle (Swedish band) =

Swedish pop band

- Origin: Sweden
- Genres: Electronic; pop; post-disco; bubblegum pop; europop; dance-pop
- Years active: 1979–1983; 1998; 2013; 2018
- Labels: Sound of Scandinavia; WM Sweden
- Past members: Tommy Ekman; Christer Sandelin; Joakim Hagleitner; Gigi Hamilton; Kayo Shekoni; Diane Corinne Söderholm; Anders Uddberg

Freestyle was a Swedish pop band formed in 1979. The best known line-up comprised Tommy Ekman, Christer Sandelin, Joakim Hagleitner, Gigi Hamilton, Anders Uddberg and Kayo Shekoni, but Kayo left the group with the release of the fourth single "Vill ha dej" and was replaced by Diane Corinne Söderholm, a half-sister of Rita Marley. The most notable hits of the group include "Vill ha dej", "Fantasi", "Ögon som glittrar" and "Rider omkring". "Vill ha dej" (also spelled "Vill ha dig") stayed on top of the Swedish Singles Chart for five consecutive weeks and was covered by Swedish solo project Drömhus in 1998. Freestyle disbanded in 1983 with Ekman, Sandelin and Hamilton continuing as Style. Söderholm formed DaYeene with her sister Jeanette. Freestyle reformed for the Summer of 1998 to re-record "Fantasi" and "Ögon Som Glittrar" and to release a new compilation album. "Fantasi" became a huge hit once again and Freestyle made a one-off concert in Stockholm.

== Discography ==
=== Albums ===
- Fantasi (1981)
- Modiga agenter (1982)
- Free Style (1983)
- 10 (1990, compilation)

=== Compilations ===
- Freestyle's Bästa (1986)
- Guldkorn-Den Kompletta Samlingen (1998) #2
- Golden Hits/2CD (1998)

=== Singles ===
- "Take Me Home" (1980)
- "Running Away" (1980)
- "Vill ha dej/I Want You" (1980) #1
- "Fantasi" (1981) #13
- "Rider omkring" (1981)
- "Nära dej" (1981)
- "Bubblar" (1981)
- "Är det värt..." (1981)
- "One More Ride/Fantasy" (1981)
- "Ögon som glittrar" (1982) #3
- "Att leka med känslor" (1982)
- "Modiga agenter/Vill du ha en del av min sommar" (1982) #13
- "Mission Impossible/Hard to Handle" (1982)
- "Fingers in Motion" (1983)
- "Musiken gör mig vild/Nattens dockor" (1983)
- "Fantasi/10" (1991)
- "C&N Medley '98/DJ Promotion" (1998)
- "Fantasi '98" (1998) #37
- "Ögon som glittrar '98" (1998)
