= Café (magazine) =

Swedish men's magazine

- Café (July 2009 issue)
- Editor-in-chief: Jens Stenberg
- Categories: Men's
- Frequency: Monthly
- Circulation: 20,800 (2014)
- Publisher: Aller Media AB
- First issue: May 1990
- Company: Aller Media
- Country: Sweden
- Based in: Stockholm
- Language: Swedish
- Website: www.cafe.se/

Café is a monthly Swedish men's magazine focused on fashion, style, and culture, including articles on food, movies, fitness, sex, music, travel, sports, technology, and books. The magazine is comparable to U.S. publications such as Esquire and GQ. It is published in Stockholm, Sweden.

== History and profile ==
Café debuted in May 1990, aimed toward the new generation of metrosexual men. Initially, the magazine was published by now-defunct Rosenudde Publishing. In December 1991, the magazine was bought out by Hachette Sweden Ltd., a subsidiary of Hachette Filipacchi Media. The magazine is part of Aller Media AB, which acquired it from Hachette Filipacchi Media in 2007. It is published by a subsidiary of the company in Stockholm. One of the sister magazines of Café is Svensk Damtidning.

From 2003 to 2013, Markus Kylén was the editor-in-chief of Café. Jens Stenberg replaced him in the post. Due to its success in Sweden, the magazine has branched out to Finland with its large Swedish-speaking audience.

The circulation of Café was 20,800 copies in 2014.

== Covers ==
The first issue of Cafe featured professional footballer Glenn Hysén. Subsequent covers featured mostly male actors and sports figures such as Sean Connery, Mike Tyson and Zlatan Ibrahimović. By the mid-nineties, the covers predominantly featured women, mostly famous Swedish models.

Victoria Silvstedt has appeared on the magazine's cover a total of 10 times and counting. Other notable celebrities who have frequently been featured on the cover are Izabella Scorupco, Anine Bing, Pernilla Wahlgren, Carolina Gynning, Marie Serneholt, and Emma Johnsson.

== See also ==
- List of men's magazines
