= Christer Sandelin =

Swedish singer, songwriter and musician (born 1961)

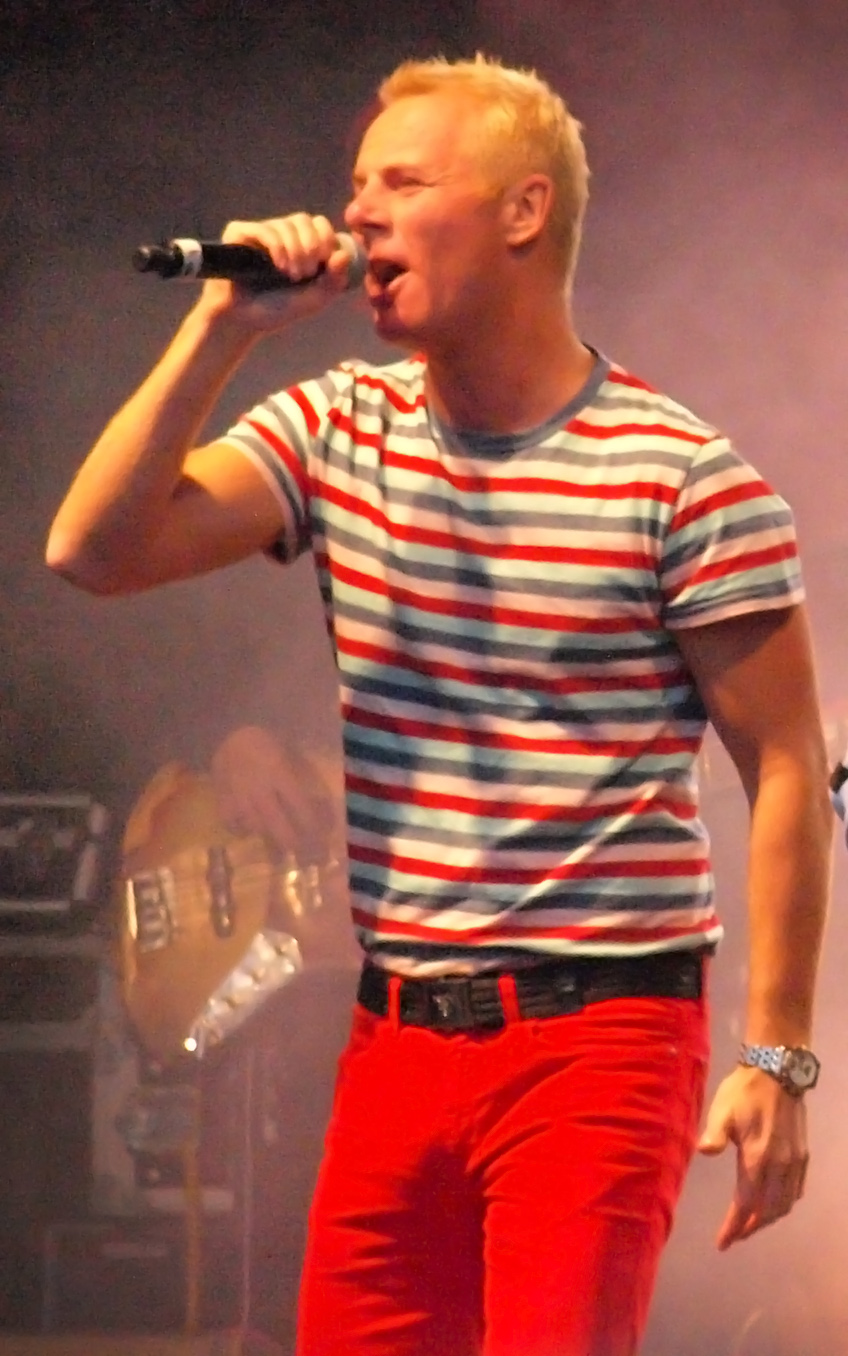
- Sandelin performing in June 2009
- Born: Christer Eric Sandelin; 5 November 1961 (age 64); Stockholm, Sweden
- Occupations: Singer; songwriter; musician
- Years active: 1978–present
- Musical career
- Genres: Pop
- Instrument: Vocals

Christer Eric Sandelin (born 5 November 1961) is a Swedish singer, songwriter and musician. He has been a part of two groups. In 1978, he was in the Swedish group Freestyle with Tommy Ekman, Joakim Hagleitner, Gigi Hamilton, Diane Söderholm and Anders Uddbergand, and after the break-up of the band in 1983, he continued with Ekman and Hamilton to form the Swedish band trio Style.

In 1989, he started his solo career with his debut album Luften darrar and has had a number of albums. He has also produced for a number of artists Lars Vegas trio and the duos Ronny och Ragge, Rob'n'Raz, Antique and The Graaf Sisters (Magdalena Graaf and Hannah Graaf) and singer Vicki Benckert.

He also continued to cooperate extensively with Tommy Ekman including writing and producing together and in their joint album I Stero and the joint single "Singlar (oh oh)".

== In popular culture ==
- Christer Eric Sandelin has participated several times in Melodifestivalen. In Melodifestivalen 1986 he sang "Dover-Calais" as part of the band Style placing 3rd. He also contested in Melodifestivalen 1987 with "Hand i hand", again with Style, placing 6th.
- The song "Dover-Calais" written by Sandelin and Tommy Ekart and performed by Style was used in the soundtrack of the 1989 film S/Y Joy (Swedish S/Y Glädjen).
- He has appeared on a number of television shows including Så mycket bättre in 2010, the program's first season. In 2011–2012, he took part in the series Copycat Singers appearing in episode 7, broadcast on January 19th 2012.

== Discography ==
(For discography while in Freestyle and Style, see their respective pages)

=== Albums ===
- 1989: Luften darrar
- 1990: Drömmer i färg
- 1992: Till månen runt solen
- 1994: Activity!
- 1997: Jag lever nu

Joint album

- 2004: I stereo (Sandelin and Ekman)

Soundtrack

- 1995: Mördande intelligens

=== Singles ===
- 1986: "Mine"
- 1989: "Hit Me!"
- 1989: "Luften darrar"
- 1989: "Det hon vill ha"
- 1990: "Vi är"
- 1990: "Jag tror hon inte vet"
- 1990: "Kom in i mitt liv"
- 1991: "Ge och ta (Jag vill tala om för hela världen)"
- 1992: "Galen"
- 1992: "Till månen runt solen"
- 1992: "Murar kan falla"
- 1993: "Secrets"
- 1994: "Kitsch Will Make You Happy"
- 1994: "My Girl (Remix)"
- 1995: "Fresh"
- 1997" "Jag lever nu"
- 1997: "Kan inte sova"
- 1997: "Sol Sol Sol"

Joint Sandelin/Ekman

- 1990: "10"
- 2004: "Så länge du vill"
- 2004: "Upp för trappan"
- 2005: "Komma dig nära"
- 2005: "Dansar med mig själv"
- 2006: "Singlar (oh, oh)"

Soundtracks

- 1998: "Pojkar som män" (from film Lilla Jönssonligan på styva linan)
