= List of family relations in Allsvenskan =

This is a list of family relations in Allsvenskan. Since the creation of the Allsvenskan in 1924, family members have been involved in all aspects of the league. Although most connections are among players, there have also been family members involved in coaching.

The Nordahl has had the largest number of family members – seven – play and coach in Allsvenskan. The original five brothers (Bertil, Knut, Gunnar, Gösta, Göran) and two of their sons (cousins Thomas and Per-Gösta) result in multiple brother/father-son/uncle-nephew/cousin combinations.

The longest multi-generational family is the direct line of three generations starting with Gösta Sandberg, father of Lars Sandberg, who is father-in-law of Anton Sandberg Magnusson and Gustav Sandberg Magnusson, and the Bild family: Harry Bild, uncle of Per-Olof Bild, who is the father Andreas and Fredrik Bild. To note is also the Hysén family of Allsvenskan players: brothers Erik and Carl Hysén, Eriks's grandson Glenn Hysén, whose sons Tobias and Alexander Hysén also have played in Allsvenskan, all except Alexander for IFK Göteborg. Glenn's father Kurt Hysén also played for IFK Göteborg, however not in the senior team.

Another family is the Svensson family playing for Östers IF: brothers Peter and Tommy Svensson, and their brothers-in-law Karl-Axel Blomqvist and Kalle Björklund, Blomqvist's grandson Matteo Blomqvist-Zampi and Björklund's son Joachim Björklund. Peter and Tommy Svensson's father (and the father-in-law of Karl-Axel Blomqvist and Karl-Gunnar Björklund) played for Östers IF before they were promoted to Allsvenskan and was chairman during a number of Allsvenskan seasons.

Below is a list of family relations throughout Allsvenskan as players and managers.

== Brothers ==
Last name	Siblings	Country	Notes
Albornoz	Mauricio, Miiko	Sweden; Chile	Both brothers played for IF Brommapojkarna in the 2009 season.
Alexandersson	Niclas, Daniel	Sweden	Both brothers played for IFK Göteborg in the 2008 and 2009 seasons.
Amuneke	Kevin, Kingsley	Nigeria	Both brothers played for Landskrona BoIS in the 2005 season.
Anderberg	Gunnar, Lennart	Sweden	
Andersson	Patrik, Daniel	Sweden	Both brothers played for Malmö FF.
Andersson	Rolf-Inge, Sven-Bertil, Bo	Sweden	All three brothers played for Mjällby AIF.
Andersson-Tvilling	Hans, Stig (twins)	Sweden	Both brothers played for Djurgårdens IF.
Aronsson	Jan, Leif	Sweden	Both brothers played for Degerfors IF and Djurgårdens IF.
Augustsson	Jörgen, Bo	Sweden	Both brothers played for Åtvidabergs FF and Landskrona BoIS in the 1970s.
Augustsson	Andreas, Jakob	Sweden	
Berg	Jonatan, Marcus	Sweden	Both brothers played for IFK Göteborg.
Bergvall	Theo, Lucas	Sweden	Both brothers played for Djurgårdens IF.
Bild	Andreas, Fredrik	Sweden	
Börjesson	Helge, Rune	Sweden	Both brothers played for Örgryte IS in the 1959 to 1961 as well as the 1964 to 1966 seasons.
Carlsson	Jerry, Conny	Sweden	Both brothers played multiple seasons together for IFK Göteborg.
Dahlgren	Gert, Kenneth	Sweden	Both brothers played for Landskrona BoIS.
Dahlin	Johan, Erik	Sweden	Both brothers played as goalkeepers.
Dahlqvist	Edvin, Isak	Sweden	Both brothers played for IFK Göteborg.
Ekdal	Albin, Hjalmar	Sweden	Both brothers played for Djurgårdens IF.
Elm	Rasmus, Viktor, David	Sweden	All three brothers played for Kalmar FF. The three of them won the 2008 Allsvenskan.
Elmander	Johan, Patrik	Sweden	Both brothers played for Örgryte IS.
Eriksson	Jan Eriksson, Patrik Eriksson-Ohlsson	Sweden	
Farnerud	Pontus, Alexander	Sweden	Both brothers played for IFK Göteborg, Alexander also represented Landskrona, Häcken and Helsingborg.
Gustafson	Simon, Samuel (twins)	Sweden	Both brothers played for BK Häcken.
Hjertsson	Arne, Kjell, Sven	Sweden	All three brothers played for Malmö FF. The three of them made one appearance together, on 29 May 1944.
Holmgren	Tord, Tommy, Bjarne	Sweden	Tord and Tommy played for IFK Göteborg. IFK Göteborg's Tord and Tommy played against Gefle IF's Bjarne in the 1983 season.
Hult	Nils, Leif	Sweden	Both brothers played as goalkeepers.
Hysén	Erik, Carl	Sweden	Both brothers played for IFK Göteborg.
Hysén	Tobias, Alexander	Sweden	Both brothers played for BK Häcken.
Jansson	Ulrik, Jesper	Sweden	Both brothers played for Östers IF and Helsingborgs IF
Jawo	Omar, Amadou	Gambia; Sweden	Both brothers played for Gefle IF.
Johansson	Allan, Nils	Sweden	Both brothers played for IFK Göteborg.
Källström	Mikael, Jonas	Sweden	
Karlsson	Allan, Wilhelm	Sweden	Both brothers played for Billingsfors IK. Their brothers Rickard, Arvid, Ragnar, and Nils also played for Billingsfors IK, however not in Allsvenskan.
Kujović	Ajsel, Emir	Sweden	Both brothers played for Halmstads BK in the 2008 and 2009 seasons.
Larsson	Peder, Stefan	Sweden	Both brothers played for IF Elfsborg.
Leback	Börje, Yngve (twins)	Sweden	Both brothers played for AIK.
Lindman	Jörgen, Sven	Sweden	Both brothers played for Djurgårdens IF.
Löfgren	Gunnar, Stig	Sweden	Both brothers played for IFK Göteborg.
Magnusson	Benno, Pär	Sweden	Their brother Roger Magnusson represented Sweden national team, but never played in Allsvenskan.
Målberg	Boris, Leif, Morgan	Sweden	Boris and Leif played for IF Elfsborg. IF Elfsborg's Boris and Leif played against IFK Holmsund's Morgan in the 1967 season.
Mayambela	Mark, Mihlali	South Africa	Both brothers played for Djurgårdens IF.
Nordahl	Bertil, Knut, Gunnar, Gösta, Göran	Sweden	Knut, Göran and Gösta played for IFK Norrköping. Gunnar and Bertil played for Degerfors IF.
Ohlsson	Kenneth, Billy	Sweden	Both brothers played for Hammarby IF.
Ohlsson	Sebastian, Samuel	Sweden	Both brothers played for IFK Göteborg, with Samuel only appearing once in Allsvenskan.
Persson	Einar, Ingvar, Valfrid, Rune, Gunnar	Sweden	All five brothers played for Sandvikens IF.
Rajalakso	Sebastian, Joel	Sweden	
Ravelli	Andreas, Thomas, Stefan	Sweden	All three brothers played for Östers IF. Andreas and Thomas played for IFK Göteborg.
Risp–Vilahamn	Fredrik, Robert	Sweden	Both brothers played for IFK Göteborg.
Svensson	Henning, Urban	Sweden	Both brothers played for IFK Göteborg.
Sandberg Magnusson	Gustav, Anton	Sweden	
Schiller	Glenn, Dennis	Sweden	Both brothers played for IFK Göteborg.
Sema	Ken, Maic	Sweden	
Svensson	Tommy, Peter	Sweden	
Rydberg	Gunnar, Anders	Sweden	Both brothers played multiple seasons together for IFK Göteborg.
Wålemark	Jens, Bo, Jörgen	Sweden	
Walker	Robert, Kevin	Sweden	Both brothers played for Örebro SK in the 2007 season.
Wallin	Viktor, Nils	Sweden	Both brothers played for IFK Göteborg.
Wessberg	Sten, Kenneth	Sweden	Both brothers played for GAIS.

== Father and son ==
Parent	Children	Country	Notes
Lars-Erik Ahlberg	Peter Ahlberg	Sweden	
Mauritz Åkervall	Bo Åkervall	Sweden	
Lennart Alexandersson	Niclas Alexandersson, Daniel Alexandersson	Sweden	All played for Halmstads BK.
Stefan Allbäck	Marcus Allbäck	Sweden	Both played for Örgryte IS.
Rolf Almqvist	Reine Almqvist	Sweden	
Nils Åman	Ronald Åhman	Sweden	
Frans Anderberg	Gunnar Anderberg, Lennart Anderberg	Sweden	
Roger Andersson	Tomas Andersson	Sweden	Both played for IF Elfsborg.
Roy Andersson	Patrik Andersson, Daniel Andersson	Sweden	All played for Malmö FF.
Werner Andersson	Lennart Andersson	Sweden	Both played for IFK Göteborg.
Sanny Åslund	Martin Åslund	Sweden	Both played for AIK.
Bo Augustsson	Andreas Augustsson, Jakob Augustsson	Sweden	
Stuart Baxter	Lee Baxter	Scotland; Sweden	
Per-Olof Bild	Andreas Bild, Fredrik Bild	Sweden	
Kalle Björklund	Joachim Björklund	Sweden	Both played for Östers IF.
Bror Blom	Gunnar Blom	Sweden	Both played for IFK Eskilstuna.
Jan Borgqvist	Lars Borgqvist	Sweden	Both played for AIK.
Lars Borgqvist	Michael Borgqvist	Sweden	Both played for AIK.
Erik Börjesson	Reino Börjesson	Sweden	
Helge Börjesson	Sören Börjesson	Sweden	Both played for and managed Örgryte IS. Both Sören and his uncle (Helge's brother) Rune have become Allsvenskan top scorers.
Henry Carlsson	Björn Carlsson	Sweden	Both played for AIK.
Elof Cronman	Jan Cronman	Sweden	
Gunnar Dahlgren	Gert Dahlgren, Kenneth Dahlgren	Sweden	All three played for Landskrona BoIS.
Stefan Dahlin	Johan Dahlin, Erik Dahlin	Sweden	All three played as goalkeepers.
Bengt Dahlqvist	Peter Dahlqvist	Sweden	
Ranko Đorđić	Bojan Djordjic	Yugoslavia; Sweden	
Gösta Dunker	Rolf Dunker	Sweden	
Ragnar Eriksson	Yngve Eriksson	Sweden	
Stig Eriksson	Dixie Eriksson	Sweden	
Bert Fagerman	Kenneth Fagerman	Sweden	
Leif Forsberg	Emil Forsberg	Sweden	Both played for GIF Sundsvall.
Lennart Forsberg	Leif Forsberg	Sweden	
Gunnar Granbom	Krister Granbom	Sweden	Both played for Helsingborgs IF.
Holger Hansson	Roger Hansson	Sweden	
Ronnie Hellström	Erland Hellström	Sweden	Both played for Hammarby IF.
Arne Hjertsson	Kenneth Hjertsson	Sweden	
Folke Holmberg	Lars-Ove Holmberg	Sweden	Both played for Hammarby IF.
Oscar Holmqvist	Leif Holmqvist	Sweden	Both played for IFK Norrköping.
Henry Holmsten	Lars Holmsten	Sweden	Both played for Halmstads BK.
Glenn Hysén	Tobias Hysén, Alexander Hysén	Sweden	Glenn and Tobias both played for IFK Göteborg.
Lars-Olof Jingblad	Mats Jingblad	Sweden	Both played for Halmstads BK.
Georg Johansson	Stig Johansson	Sweden	Both played for IK Brage.
Gustaf Johansson	Ronald Johansson	Sweden	Both played for IFK Göteborg.
Hans Johansson	Johan Johansson	Sweden	
Inge Johansson	Lennart Johansson	Sweden	Both played for IF Elfsborg.
Johan Johansson	Sam Lundholm	Sweden	Both played for AIK.
Nils Johansson	Magnus Johansson	Sweden	Both played for IFK Göteborg.
Manfred Johnsson	Nils Johnsson	Sweden	
Harry Jönsson	Peter Jönsson	Sweden	Both played for Malmö FF.
Mikael Källström	Kim Källström	Sweden	Both played for BK Häcken.
Bengt Karlsson	Mats Karlsson	Sweden	
Mats Karlsson	Pontus Karlsson	Sweden	
Ove Kindvall	Niclas Kindvall	Sweden	Both played for IFK Norrköping.
Henrik Larsson	Jordan Larsson	Sweden	Both played for Helsingborgs IF.
Henry Larsson	Peder Larsson, Stefan Larsson	Sweden	All three played for IF Elfsborg.
Anders Lewicki	Oscar Lewicki	Sweden	
Anders Linderoth	Tobias Linderoth	Sweden	Both were in IF Elfsborg organization in 1997 season, Anders as manager and Tobias as player.
Thorsten Lindskog	Bengt Lindskog	Sweden	
Göte Lindstrand	Hans Lindstrand	Sweden	Both played for Jönköpings Södra IF.
Birger Lönn	Peter Lönn	Sweden	Both played for IFK Norrköping.
Herbert Lundgren	Sten Lundgren	Sweden	
Hugo Lydén	Stefan Lydén	Sweden	Both played for IF Elfsborg.
Gösta Malm	Tomas Malm	Sweden	Both played for IFK Norrköping.
Örjan Martinsson	Tony Martinsson	Sweden	Both played for IFK Norrköping.
Gösta Nordahl	Per-Gösta Nordahl	Sweden	
Gunnar Nordahl	Thomas Nordahl	Sweden	Both played for Degerfors IF.
Frans Nilsson	Carl Nilsson	Sweden	Both played for Landskrona BoIS.
Fritz Nilsson	Jörgen Nilsson	Sweden	Both played for Åtvidabergs FF.
Ivar Nilsson	Bo Nilmert	Sweden	Both played for Kalmar FF.
Ruben Nilsson	Erik Nilsson	Sweden	Both played for IFK Eskilstuna.
Sven Nilsson	Bertil Nilsson	Sweden	Both played for Malmö FF.
Arne Nyberg	Ralph Nyberg	Sweden	Both played for IFK Göteborg.
Henning Olsson	Stig Olsson	Sweden	Both played for IFK Eskilstuna.
Karl-Erik Palmér	Anders Palmér	Sweden	Both played for Malmö FF.
Ingvar Petersson	Bo Petersson	Sweden	
Sune Petersson	Alf Peterson	Sweden	Both played for Halmstads BK.
Bengt Pettersson	Stefan Pettersson	Sweden	
Igor Ponomaryov	Anatoli Ponomarev	Soviet Union; Azerbaijan	
Ronnie Powell	Magnus Powell	England; Sweden	
Kjell Rosén	Sven Rosén	Sweden	Both played for Malmö FF.
Birger Sandberg	Per Sandberg	Sweden	Both played for Djurgårdens IF.
Gösta Sandberg	Lars Sandberg	Sweden	Both played for Djurgårdens IF.
Bengt Sjögren	Lars Sjögren	Sweden	Both played for Åtvidabergs FF.
Erik Svensson	Lennart Svensson	Sweden	Both played for Malmö FF.
Börje Tapper	Staffan Tapper	Sweden	Both played for Malmö FF.
Jonas Thern	Simon Thern	Sweden	Both played for Malmö FF.
Tom Turesson	Tomas Turesson	Sweden	Both played for Hammarby IF.
Pekka Utriainen	Peter Utriainen	Finland	
Pat Walker	Robert Walker, Kevin Walker	Ireland; Sweden	All three were in the Örebro SK organization in 2007 season, Pat as manager and Robert and Kevin as players. Both Pat and Kevin played for GIF Sundsvall.
Joakim Wendt	Oscar Wendt	Sweden	Both played for IFK Göteborg.
Bertil Wennerström	Ulf Wennerström	Sweden	Both played for Kalmar FF.
Henning Wessberg	Sten Wessberg, Kenneth Wessberg	Sweden	All three played for GAIS.
Lennart Westergren	Anders Westergren	Sweden	Both played for Halmstads BK.
Vadym Yevtushenko	Vyacheslav Jevtushenko	Ukraine; Sweden	Both played for AIK.
Göran Ytterell	Leif Ytterell	Sweden	

== Grandfather and grandson ==
Grandfather	Grandson	Country	Notes
Karl-Axel Blomqvist	Matteo Blomqvist-Zampi	Sweden	
Jan Borgqvist	Michael Borgqvist	Sweden	Both played for AIK.
Erik Hysén	Glenn Hysén	Sweden	Both played for IFK Göteborg.
Hans Johansson	Sam Lundholm	Sweden	
Lennart Forsberg	Emil Forsberg	Sweden	
Bengt Karlsson	Pontus Karlsson	Sweden	
Gösta Sandberg	Gustav Sandberg Magnusson, Anton Sandberg Magnusson	Sweden	

== Great-grandfather and great-grandson ==
Great-grandfather	Great-grandson	Country	Notes
Erik Hysén	Tobias Hysén, Alexander Hysén	Sweden	Erik and Tobias both played for IFK Göteborg.

== Uncle and nephew ==
This category is for such pairings not already listed in the Brothers and Father and son sections above.

Uncle	Nephew	Country	Notes
Jörgen Augustsson, Bo Augustsson	Jimmie Augustsson	Sweden	
Harry Bild	Per-Olof Bild	Sweden	
Allan Karlsson, Wilhelm Karlsson	Aller Karlsson	Sweden	All three played for Billingsfors IK in the 1946–47 season.
Lars Sandberg	Gustav Sandberg Magnusson, Anton Sandberg Magnusson	Sweden	

== Cousins ==
Cousin	Cousin	Country	Notes
Andreas Augustsson, Jakob Augustsson	Jimmie Augustsson	Sweden	
Carlos Banda	Carlos Banda (manager)	Sweden	Both in the Djurgårdens IF organization.
Imad Khalili	Abdul Khalili	Sweden	Both played for Helsingborgs IF and Hammarby IF.
Moses Nsubuga	Martin Kayongo-Mutumba	Sweden; Uganda	Second cousins.

== In-laws ==
In-law	In-law	Country	Notes
Kalle Björklund, Karl-Axel Blomqvist	Tommy Svensson, Peter Svensson	Sweden	Karl-Gunnar and Karl-Axel are brothers-in-law of Tommy and Peter.
Alexander Hysén, Tobias Hysén	Andreas Drugge	Sweden	Andreas is brother-in-law of Alexander and Tobias, and son in law of Glenn Hysén. Tobias and Andreas played in IFK Göteborg in the 2011 season.
