= Augustsson =

Augustsson is a Swedish surname. Notable people with the surname include:

- Andreas Augustsson (born 1976), Swedish football defender
- Anna-Lisa Augustsson (1924–2012), Swedish sprinter
- Bo Augustsson (born 1949), former Swedish professional footballer
- Danny Sjöberg-Augustsson (born 1958), former Swedish handball player
- Jörgen Augustsson (born 1952), former Swedish footballer
- Jakob Augustsson (born 1980), right or left wing defender
- Jimmie Augustsson (born 1981), Swedish footballer
- Lennart Augustsson, Swedish computer scientist
