= Andreas Augustsson =

Swedish footballer

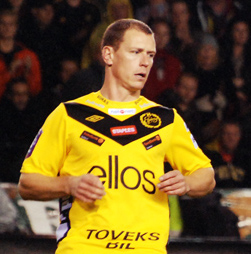

Personal information
- Full name: Eiton Andreas Augustsson
- Date of birth: 26 November 1976 (age 49)
- Place of birth: Häljarp, Sweden
- Height: 1.84 m (6 ft 1/2 in)
- Position: Defender

Team information
- Current team: GAIS
- Number: 2

Youth career
- 1988–1992: Malmö FF

Senior career*
Years	Team	Apps	(Gls)
1992–1995	Helsingborg	0	(0)
1995–1998	Twente	3	(0)
1998–1999	Raufoss	38	(5)
2000–2003	Vålerenga	30	(3)
2003–2005	Sandefjord	61	(12)
2006–2008	Elfsborg	69	(5)
2009–2011	Horsens	56	(2)
2011–2012	Elfsborg	45	(2)
2013–2014	GAIS	25	(2)
Total		327	(31)
- * Club domestic league appearances and goals as of 26 January 2013

Eiton Andreas Augustsson (born 26 November 1976) is a Swedish retired footballer who played as a defender. He made his professional debut in Twente, before he moved to Norway in 2001 where in played for Raufoss, Vålerenga and Sandefjord. Augustsson later returned to his native Sweden, where he won the Allsvenskan with IF Elfsborg in 2006. After a spell in Danish club AC Horsens, he returned to Elfsborg in 2011. After winning his second Allsvenskan title with Elfsborg in 2012, he joined GAIS ahead of the 2013 season.

== Career ==
Hailing from Häljarp, Augustsson played for Häljarps IF before he joined Malmö FF's youth squad. He transferred to rivaling club Helsingborg IF in 1992, where he was included in the first-team squad without playing any matches. He moved to Twente in 1995, where he failed to make a break-through in the first team, and played only three league-matches during his time in the Netherlands. Augustsson moved back to Scandinavia in 1998 and joined Norwegian First Division side Raufoss. He was brought to the Tippeligaen side Vålerenga ahead of the 2000 season, as one of Tom Nordlie's first signings. After Vålerenga's relegation from Tippeligaen, he was playing regularly when the team won promotion back to Tippeligaen in 2001. Because of injuries, he only made one appearance in the 2002 season.

The defender returned to the second tier in 2003, when he signed a contract with Sandefjord. The club narrowly missed out on promotion to the Tippeligaen several times during Augustsson spell at the club. In a match against one of Sandefjord's challengers for promotion in 2004, Aalesund, Augustsson got a red card, towards the end of the first half, for biting the opponent goalkeeper Kim Deinoff in the arm. Augustsson said after the match that he was stuck underneath a few players and was struck by panic, but the next day he apologized to Deinoff. Despite playing half the match with ten players, Sandefjord won 2–0. Sandefjord won promotion to Tippeligaen for the first time in history in 2005, after they won 4–2 against promotion-challengers Moss in the decisive match. Augustsson scored one of Sandefjord's goals, while his teammate Andreas Tegström scored a hat-trick. Augustsson left the club after the season.

Ahead of the 2006 season, Augustsson transferred to Swedish club IF Elfsborg where he scored a goal in his first match in the Allsvenskan, against IFK Göteborg on 20 April 2006. He established himself as a regular in the team's defense alongside Jon Jönsson, and Augustsson scored a total of three goals in 26 games when the team won the 2006 Allsvenskan. After playing for the club for three seasons, he left Sweden and transferred to the Danish Superliga side AC Horsens, where he signed a contract lasting until the summer of 2011. Augustsson was the team's captain while playing for Horsens. In October 2010, he expressed a desire to return to Elfsborg, as he had built a new house in Sandared.

Augustsson returned to Sweden and re-joined Elfsborg in January 2011, six months before his contract with Horsens expired. With Jörgen Lennartsson as head coach, Augustsson made 17 appearances when Elfsborg again won the Allsvenskan in 2012. The club did not want to renew Augustsson's contract, which expired after the 2012-season, and he joined the Superettan side GAIS along with Joel Johansson, Mohammed Abdulrahman, Marcus Jakobssen and Hampus Andersson in January 2013. Augustsson signed a two-year contract with the club.

== Personal life ==
Augustsson comes from a family of footballers, and his father, former footballer Bo Augustsson was assistant coach and player developer in Sandefjord during Andreas' spell at the club. In 2005, his brother Jakob also joined the club. Their third brother, Johan is also a footballer. Bo's brother Jörgen was a part of the Sweden national team for the 1974 World Cup. Andreas' cousins Jimmie and Christian are also footballers.
