= Hysén =

Hysén is a Swedish surname. Notable people with the surname include:

- Alexander Hysén (born 1987), Swedish football goalkeeper
- Antonio Hysén (born 1990), Swedish football player
- Glenn Hysén (born 1959), Swedish footballer and manager
- Tobias Hysén (born 1982), Swedish footballer

== See also ==
- Hysen
