= Bild (surname) =

Bild is a surname. Notable people with the surname include:

- Andreas Bild (born 1971), Swedish footballer
- Fred Bild (born 1935), Canadian diplomat and Holocaust survivor
- Fredrik Bild (born 1974), Swedish footballer, brother of Andreas and grand-nephew of Harry
- Harry Bild (1936–2025), Swedish footballer
