= Bild (disambiguation) =

Bild may refer to:

== People ==
- Bild (surname), people with the surname

== Media ==
- Bild, German tabloid
  - Bild (TV channel), defunct German television channel
  - Bild am Sonntag, German national Sunday newspaper
  - Auto Bild, German automobile magazine
  - Computer Bild, German fortnightly computer magazine
- Bild der Frau, German language weekly women's magazine
- Hänt Bild, Swedish celebrity magazine
- Sport Bild, German sports magazine

== Others ==
- "Das Bild" (Schubert), a song composed in 1815

== See also ==
- Bildt (disambiguation)
