= Bo Augustsson =

Swedish association footballer

Personal information
- Full name: Bo Augustsson
- Date of birth: 28 December 1949 (age 76)
- Place of birth: Mala, Sweden
- Height: 1.88 m (6 ft 2 in)
- Position: Midfielder

Youth career
- Mala IF
- Hässleholms IF

Senior career*
Years	Team	Apps	(Gls)
1968–1972	Åtvidabergs FF	71	(4)
1972-1974	FC Den Haag	19	(3)
1974	Åtvidabergs FF	21	(2)
1975-1979	Landskrona BoIS	102	(16)
- * Club domestic league appearances and goals as of 04:07, 3 March 2020 (UTC)

Bo Augustsson (born 28 December 1949) is a former Swedish professional footballer who played for Åtvidabergs FF, Den Haag and BoIS.

Augustsson grew up in Mala near Hässleholm. As a child, he played football with his brothers on a piece of land near their home. At the age of 17 he moved to Åtvidaberg, and played for Åtvidabergs FF which had just been promoted to Allsvenskan, while he finished his secondary school studies in Linköping. He was recruited by FC Den Haag in 1972, and remained in Holland for two years. He returned to Åtvidaberg in 1974, and finished his career as a player in Landskrona BoIS; a knee injury forced him to stop playing actively.

Augustsson worked as a teacher, but was recruited to BoIS as a youth coach in the 1980s. He subsequently worked as a senior coach for various clubs including Malmö FF, Helsingborgs IF, Bunkeflo FF, Luleå FF, AIK), as well as abroad, in Norway (Sandefjord Fotball), Finland (Turku), Netherlands (Feyenoord), the United Arab Emirates (Abu Dhabi), and South Africa (Kaizer Chiefs Youth Academy).

== Personal life ==
He has a younger brother, (Jörgen), who played for Sweden in 1974 at the FIFA World Cup. His sons Andreas and Jakob have played football in Allsvenskan, the Swedish professional football league; in addition, both brothers played for the Norwegian club Sandefjord when their father was a coach there.
