= Let's Dance 2012 =

- Season 2012
- Celebrity winner: Anton Hysén
- Professional winner: Sigrid Bernson
- No. of episodes: 10

Release
- Original network: TV4
- Original release: 30 March – 1 June 2012

Season chronology
- ← Previous; Let's Dance 2011 Next → Let's Dance 2013

Let's Dance 2012 was the seventh season of the Swedish version of the celebrity dance show Strictly Come Dancing, and was broadcast on the Swedish television channel TV4 starting on 30 March 2012. Anton Hysen won the season.

== Couples ==
Celebrity	Occupation	Professional partner	Status
Pär-Ola Nyström	Show Jumper & TV Star	Jeanette Carlsson	Eliminated 1st on 6 April 2012
Helena Paparizou	Singer	David Watson	Eliminated 2nd on 13 April 2012
Bengt Frithiofsson	Wine Expert	Oksana Spichak	Eliminated 3rd on 20 April 2012
Pernilla Wahlgren	Singer	Tobias Bader	Eliminated 4th on 27 April 2012
Anders Timell	Presenter & restaurateur	Cecilia Ehrling	Eliminated 5th on 4 May 2012
Camilla Henemark	Singer & Actress	Tobias Karlsson	Eliminated 6th on 11 May 2012
Camilla Läckberg	Crime Writer	Kristjan Lootus	Eliminated 7th on 18 May 2012
Marcus Schenkenberg	Model	Maria Bild	Third Place on 25 May 2012
Molly Nutley	Actress	Calle Sterner	Second Place on 1 June 2012
Anton Hysén	Footballer	Sigrid Bernson	Winners on 1 June 2012

== Scoring Chart ==
Couple	Place	1	2	1+2	3	4	5	6	7	8	9	10
Anton & Sigrid	1	18	13	31	26	24	23+0=23	28+10=38	29+10=39	20+27=47	27+28=55	29+30+30=89
Molly & Calle	2	9	16	25	11	13	20+0=20	24+8=32	28+6=34	23+30=53	24+30=54	29+30+30=89
Marcus & Maria	3	13	13	26	17	12	16+3=19	25+12=37	22+8=30	27+23=50	26+22=48	
Camilla L. & Kristjan	4	14	14	28	18	20	21+2=23	29+2=31	22+4=26	26+22=48		
Camilla H. & Tobias	5	10	9	19	5	7	10+1=11	16+6=22	14+2=16			
Anders & Cecilia	6	8	11	19	13	16	16+0=16	20+4=24				
Pernilla & Tobias	7	9	14	25	18	15	18+0=18					
Bengt & Oksana	8	7	12	19	9	11						
Helena & David	9	16	15	31	16							
Pär-Ola & Jeanette	10	8	5	13								

Red numbers indicate the lowest score for each week.
Green numbers indicate the highest score for each week.
indicates the couple eliminated that week.
indicates the returning couple that finished in the bottom two.
indicates the winning couple.
indicates the runner-up couple.
indicates the third place couple.

- ^1 The first week did not eliminate any couple, instead it was announced who was in the bottom two going into Week 2.
- ^2 Since Week 1 was a non-elimination week, Week 2 featured a combined score of both Week 1 and 2, which was used in the final standings.

== Average chart ==
Rank by average	Place	Couple	Total	Number of dances	Average
1	1	Anton & Sigrid	352	14	25.1
2	2	Molly & Calle	317	14	22.6
3	4	Camilla & Kristjan	186	9	20.7
4	3	Marcus & Maria	216	11	19.6
5	9	Helena & David	47	3	15.7
6	7	Pernilla & Tobias	74	5	14.8
7	6	Anders & Cecilia	84	6	14.0
8	5	Camilla & Tobias	71	7	10.1
9	8	Bengt & Oksana	39	4	9.8
10	10	Pär-Ola & Jeanette	13	2	6.5

=== Average dance chart ===
Couples	Averages	Best Dance(s)	Worst Dance(s)
Anton & Sigrid	25.1	Samba & Showdance (30)	Quickstep (13)
Molly & Calle	22.6	Bugg, Tango, Paso Doble & Showdance (30)	Cha-Cha-Cha (9)
Marcus & Maria	19.6	Quickstep (27)	Samba (12)
Camilla & Kristjan	20.7	Quickstep (29)	Waltz & Rumba (14)
Camilla & Tobias	10.1	Quickstep (16)	Foxtrot (5)
Anders & Cecilia	14.0	Foxtrot (20)	Waltz (8)
Pernilla & Tobias	14.8	Jive & Tango (18)	Cha-Cha-Cha (9)
Bengt & Oksana	9.8	Quickstep (12)	Cha-Cha-Cha (7)
Helena & David	15.7	Cha-Cha-Cha & Paso Doble (16)	Quickstep (15)
Pär-Ola & Jeanette	6.5	Waltz (8)	Rumba (5)

== Highest and lowest scoring performances ==
The best and worst performances in each dance according to the judges' marks are as follows:

Dance	Best dancer(s)	Best score	Worst dancer(s)	Worst score
Cha Cha Cha	Camilla Läckberg	22	Bengt Frithiofsson	7
Waltz	Molly Nutley	28	Anders Timell; Pär-Ola Nyström	8
Rumba	Anton Hysén	28	Pär-Ola Nyström	5
Quickstep	Camilla Läckberg; Molly Nutley	29	Bengt Frithiofsson	12
Jive	Anton Hysén	27	Bengt Frithiofsson	9
Tango	Molly Nutley	30	Anders Timell	13
Paso Doble	Molly Nutley	30	Helena Paparizou	16
Foxtrot	Marcus Schenkenberg	25	Camilla Henemark	5
Samba	Anton Hysén	30	Camilla Henemark	7
Rock 'n' Roll	Marcus Schenkenberg	12	Camilla Läckberg	2
Salsa	Anton Hysén	10	Camilla Henemark	2
Viennese Waltz	Marcus Schenkenberg	3	Anton Hysén; Molly Nutley; Anders Timell; Pernilla Wahlgren	0
Bugg	Molly Nutley	30	Camilla Läckberg	22
Showdance	Molly Nutley; Anton Hysén	30	-	-

=== Dance schedule ===
The celebrities and professional partners danced one of these routines for each corresponding week.

- Week 1: Cha-Cha-Cha or Waltz
- Week 2: Rumba or Quickstep
- Week 3: One Unlearned Dance
- Week 4: Samba
- Week 5: One Unlearned Dance & Group Viennese Waltz
- Week 6: One Unlearned Dance & Rock 'n' Roll Marathon
- Week 7: One Unlearned Dance & Salsa Marathon (Movie Week)
- Week 8: One Unlearned Dance & Bugg
- Week 9: Final Unlearned Dance & Judges' Redemption Dance
- Week 10: Couple's Favorite Ballroom Dance, Couple's Favorite Latin Dance & Showdance

== Songs ==
=== Week 1 ===
Individual judges scores in charts below (given in parentheses) are listed in this order from left to right: Dermot Clemenger, Ann Wilson and Tony Irving.

Running order

Couple	Score	Style	Music
Pernilla & Tobias	9 (3,4,2)	Cha-Cha-Cha	"Ain't No Mountain High Enough" - Marvin Gaye & Tammi Terrell
Anders & Cecilia	8 (3,3,2)	Waltz	"Against All Odds (Take a Look at Me Now)" - Phil Collins
Molly & Calle	9 (2,4,3)	Cha-Cha-Cha	"Raise Your Glass" - Pink
Marcus & Maria	13 (4,5,4)	Waltz	"Longing For Lullabies" - Kleerup
Bengt & Oksana	7 (3,3,1)	Cha-Cha-Cha	"Can You Feel It" - The Jacksons
Camilla & Kristjan	14 (5,5,4)	Waltz	"(You Make Me Feel Like) A Natural Woman" - Aretha Franklin
Helena & David	16 (5,5,6)	Cha-Cha-Cha	"Hang With Me" - Robyn
Pär-Ola & Jeanette	8 (3,3,2)	Waltz	"My Heart Is Refusing Me" - Loreen
Anton & Sigrid	18 (6,6,6)	Cha-Cha-Cha	"Moves Like Jagger" - Maroon 5 feat. Christina Aguilera
Camilla & Tobias	10 (4,4,2)	Waltz	"Movin' On" - Sarah Dawn Finer

=== Week 2 ===
Individual judges scores in charts below (given in parentheses) are listed in this order from left to right: Dermot Clemenger, Ann Wilson and Tony Irving.

Running order

Couple	Score	Style	Music
Helena & David	15 (5,4,6)	Quickstep	"Domino" - Jessie J
Pär-Ola & Jeanette	5 (2,2,1)	Rumba	"In The Club" - Danny Saucedo
Bengt & Oksana	12 (4,4,4)	Quickstep	"I'm So Excited" - The Pointer Sisters
Camilla & Kristjan	14 (5,5,4)	Rumba	"No One" - Alicia Keys
Pernilla & Tobias	14 (4,5,5)	Quickstep	"Don't Stop Me Now" - Queen
Anders & Cecilia	11 (3,4,4)	Rumba	"Fields Of Gold" - Sting
Molly & Calle	16 (5,6,5)	Quickstep	"Dry My Soul" - Amanda Jensen
Camilla & Tobias	9 (4,3,2)	Rumba	"Hero" - Enrique Iglesias
Marcus & Maria	13 (4,4,5)	Rumba	"Make You Feel My Love" - Adele
Anton & Sigrid	13 (4,5,4)	Quickstep	"Kom igen Lena" - Håkan Hellström

=== Week 3 ===
Individual judges scores in charts below (given in parentheses) are listed in this order from left to right: Dermot Clemenger, Ann Wilson and Tony Irving.

Running order

Couple	Score	Style	Music
Marcus & Maria	17 (5,6,6)	Tango	"Grenade" - Bruno Mars
Molly & Calle	11 (4,4,3)	Jive	"White Light Moment" - Tove Styrke
Helena & David	16 (7,5,4)	Paso Doble	"Hurtful" - Erik Hassle
Camilla & Tobias	5 (2,2,1)	Foxtrot	"Fever" - Peggy Lee
Anders & Cecilia	13 (4,4,5)	Tango	"Välkommen in" - Veronica Maggio
Bengt & Oksana	9 (3,3,3)	Jive	"Hey Ya!" - OutKast
Anton & Sigrid	26 (9,8,9)	Paso Doble	"Hung Up" - Madonna
Camilla & Kristjan	18 (7,6,5)	Foxtrot	"Why Am I Crying" - Molly Sandén
Pernilla & Tobias	18 (6,6,6)	Jive	"I'm Still Standing" - Elton John

=== Week 4 ===
Individual judges scores in charts below (given in parentheses) are listed in this order from left to right: Dermot Clemenger, Ann Wilson and Tony Irving.

Running order

Couple	Score	Style	Music
Anders & Cecilia	16 (6,5,5)	Samba	"Don't Stop 'Til You Get Enough" - Michael Jackson
Camilla & Kristjan	20 (7,6,7)	Samba	"Release Me" - Agnes
Anton & Sigrid	24 (7,8,9)	Samba	"Ai se eu te pego" - Michel Teló
Pernilla & Tobias	15 (5,6,4)	Samba	"Torn" - Natalie Imbruglia
Bengt & Oksana	11 (3,4,4)	Samba	"Volare" - Gipsy Kings
Molly & Calle	13 (5,5,3)	Samba	"Euphoria" - Loreen
Marcus & Maria	12 (4,5,3)	Samba	"Bumpy Ride" - Mohombi
Camilla & Tobias	7 (3,3,1)	Samba	"Vart Jag Mig I Världen Vänder" - Den svenska björnstammen

=== Week 5 ===
Individual judges scores in charts below (given in parentheses) are listed in this order from left to right: Dermot Clemenger, Ann Wilson and Tony Irving.

Running order

Couple	Score	Style	Music
Pernilla & Tobias	18 (6,5,7)	Tango	"Don't Stop the Music" - Rihanna
Marcus & Maria	16 (5,5,6)	Cha-Cha-Cha	"Shout It Out" - David Lindgren
Camilla & Tobias	10 (4,4,2)	Jive	"Dancing with Tears in My Eyes" - Ultravox
Anders & Cecilia	16 (6,5,5)	Cha-Cha-Cha	"Amazing" - Danny Saucedo
Camilla & Kristjan	21 (7,7,7)	Jive	"Stay The Night" - Alcazar
Anton & Sigrid	23 (7,7,9)	Foxtrot	"I Don't Believe You" - Pink
Molly & Calle	20 (7,7,6)	Tango	"I Gotta Feeling" - Black Eyed Peas
Marcus & Maria; Camilla & Kristjan; Camilla & Tobias; Anders & Cecilia; Anton & Sigrid; Molly & Calle; Pernilla & Tobias	3; 2; 1; 0; 0; 0; 0	Viennese Waltz	"The Blue Danube" - Johann Strauss II

=== Week 6 ===
Individual judges scores in charts below (given in parentheses) are listed in this order from left to right: Dermot Clemenger, Ann Wilson and Tony Irving.

Running order

Couple	Score	Style	Music
Camilla & Kristjan	29 (10,9,10)	Quickstep	"You're the One That I Want" – John Travolta & Olivia Newton-John
Molly & Calle	24 (8,8,8)	Paso Doble	"Vårens Första Dag" - Laleh
Anders & Cecilia	20 (7,7,6)	Foxtrot	"Hero" - Charlotte Perrelli
Anton & Sigrid	28 (10,10,8)	Rumba	"One Moment In Time" - Whitney Houston
Camilla & Tobias	16 (6,6,4)	Quickstep	"Walking On Sunshine" - Katrina And The Waves
Marcus & Maria	25 (8,8,9)	Foxtrot	"I Want To Hold Your Hand" - The Beatles
Marcus & Maria; Anton & Sigrid; Molly & Calle; Camilla & Tobias; Anders & Cecilia; Camilla & Kristjan	12; 10; 8; 6; 4; 2	Rock 'n' Roll	

=== Week 7 ===
Individual judges scores in charts below (given in parentheses) are listed in this order from left to right: Dermot Clemenger, Ann Wilson and Tony Irving.

Running order

Couple	Score	Style	Music
Camilla & Tobias	14 (5,5,4)	Cha-Cha-Cha	"Flashdance... What a Feeling" - Irene Cara
Marcus & Maria	22 (7,7,8)	Paso Doble	"Eye Of The Tiger" - Survivor
Molly & Calle	28 (10,9,9)	Waltz	"Everything I Do I Do It For You" - Bryan Adams
Camilla & Kristjan	22 (8,8,6)	Cha-Cha-Cha	"Pretty Woman" - Roy Orbison
Anton & Sigrid	29 (9,10,10)	Tango	"A View to a Kill" - Duran Duran
Anton & Sigrid; Marcus & Maria; Molly & Calle; Camilla & Kristjan; Camilla & Tobias	10; 8; 6; 4; 2	Salsa	

=== Week 8 ===
Individual judges scores in charts below (given in parentheses) are listed in this order from left to right: Dermot Clemenger, Ann Wilson and Tony Irving.

Running order

Couple	Score	Style	Music
Camilla & Kristjan	26 (10,9,7)	Tango	"Born This Way" - Lady Gaga
Camilla & Kristjan	22 (7,7,8)	Bugg	"Inget Stoppar Oss Nu" - BlackJack
Marcus & Maria	27 (9,9,9)	Quickstep	"When You're Looking Like That" - Westlife
Marcus & Maria	23 (7,8,8)	Bugg	"Sofia Dansar Go-Go" - Stefan Rüdén
Anton & Sigrid	20 (7,7,6)	Waltz	"Because Of You" - Kelly Clarkson
Anton & Sigrid	27 (10,10,7)	Bugg	"Every Little Thing" - Carlene Carter
Molly & Calle	23 (7,8,8)	Rumba	"Mandy" - Barry Manilow
Molly & Calle	30 (10,10,10)	Bugg	"Hound Dog" - Elvis Presley

=== Week 9 ===
Individual judges scores in charts below (given in parentheses) are listed in this order from left to right: Dermot Clemenger, Ann Wilson and Tony Irving.

Running order

Couple	Score	Style	Music
Anton & Sigrid	27 (9,9,9)	Jive	"About You Now" - Timo Räisänen
Anton & Sigrid	28 (9,9,10)	Quickstep	"Kom Igen Lena" - Håkan Hellström
Marcus & Maria	26 (8,9,9)	Jive	"You Can't Hurry Love" - Phil Collins
Marcus & Maria	22 (7,8,7)	Samba	"Bumpy Ride" - Mohombi
Molly & Calle	24 (9,8,7)	Foxtrot	"Set Fire to the Rain" - Adele
Molly & Calle	30 (10,10,10)	Tango	"I Gotta Feeling" - Black Eyed Peas

=== Week 10 ===
Individual judges scores in charts below (given in parentheses) are listed in this order from left to right: Dermot Clemenger, Ann Wilson and Tony Irving.

Running order

Couple	Score	Style	Music
Molly & Calle	29 (10,9,10)	Quickstep	"Dry My Soul" - Amanda Jensen
Molly & Calle	30 (10,10,10)	Paso Doble	"Vårens Första Dag" - Laleh
Molly & Calle	30 (10,10,10)	Showdance	"En jävel på kärlek" - Glenmark Strömstedt Eriksson
Anton & Sigrid	29 (10,10,9)	Tango	"A View to a Kill" - Duran Duran
Anton & Sigrid	30 (10,10,10)	Samba	"Ai se eu te pego" - Michel Teló
Anton & Sigrid	30 (10,10,10)	Showdance	"It's Raining Men" - The Weather Girls

== Dance Chart ==
Couple	1	2	3	4	5		6		7		8		9		10		
Anton & Sigrid	Cha-Cha-Cha	Quickstep	Paso Doble	Samba	Foxtrot	Viennese Waltz	Rumba	Rock 'n' Roll	Tango	Salsa	Waltz	Bugg	Jive	Quickstep	Tango	Samba	Showdance
Molly & Calle	Cha-Cha-Cha	Quickstep	Jive	Samba	Tango	Viennese Waltz	Paso Doble	Rock 'n' Roll	Waltz	Salsa	Rumba	Bugg	Foxtrot	Tango	Quickstep	Paso Doble	Showdance
Marcus & Maria	Waltz	Rumba	Tango	Samba	Cha-Cha-Cha	Viennese Waltz	Foxtrot	Rock 'n' Roll	Paso Doble	Salsa	Quickstep	Bugg	Jive	Samba			
Camilla & Kristjan	Waltz	Rumba	Foxtrot	Samba	Jive	Viennese Waltz	Quickstep	Rock 'n' Roll	Cha-Cha-Cha	Salsa	Tango	Bugg					
Camilla & Tobias	Waltz	Rumba	Foxtrot	Samba	Jive	Viennese Waltz	Quickstep	Rock 'n' Roll	Cha-Cha-Cha	Salsa							
Anders & Cecilia	Waltz	Rumba	Tango	Samba	Cha-Cha-Cha	Viennese Waltz	Foxtrot	Rock 'n' Roll									
Pernilla & Tobias	Cha-Cha-Cha	Quickstep	Jive	Samba	Tango	Viennese Waltz											
Bengt & Oksana	Cha-Cha-Cha	Quickstep	Jive	Samba													
Helena & David	Cha-Cha-Cha	Quickstep	Paso Doble														
Pär-Ola & Jeanette	Waltz	Rumba															

Highest Scoring Dance
Lowest Scoring Dance
Dances performed at the finale by previously eliminated celebrities
