= Molly Nutley =

Swedish actress (born 1995)

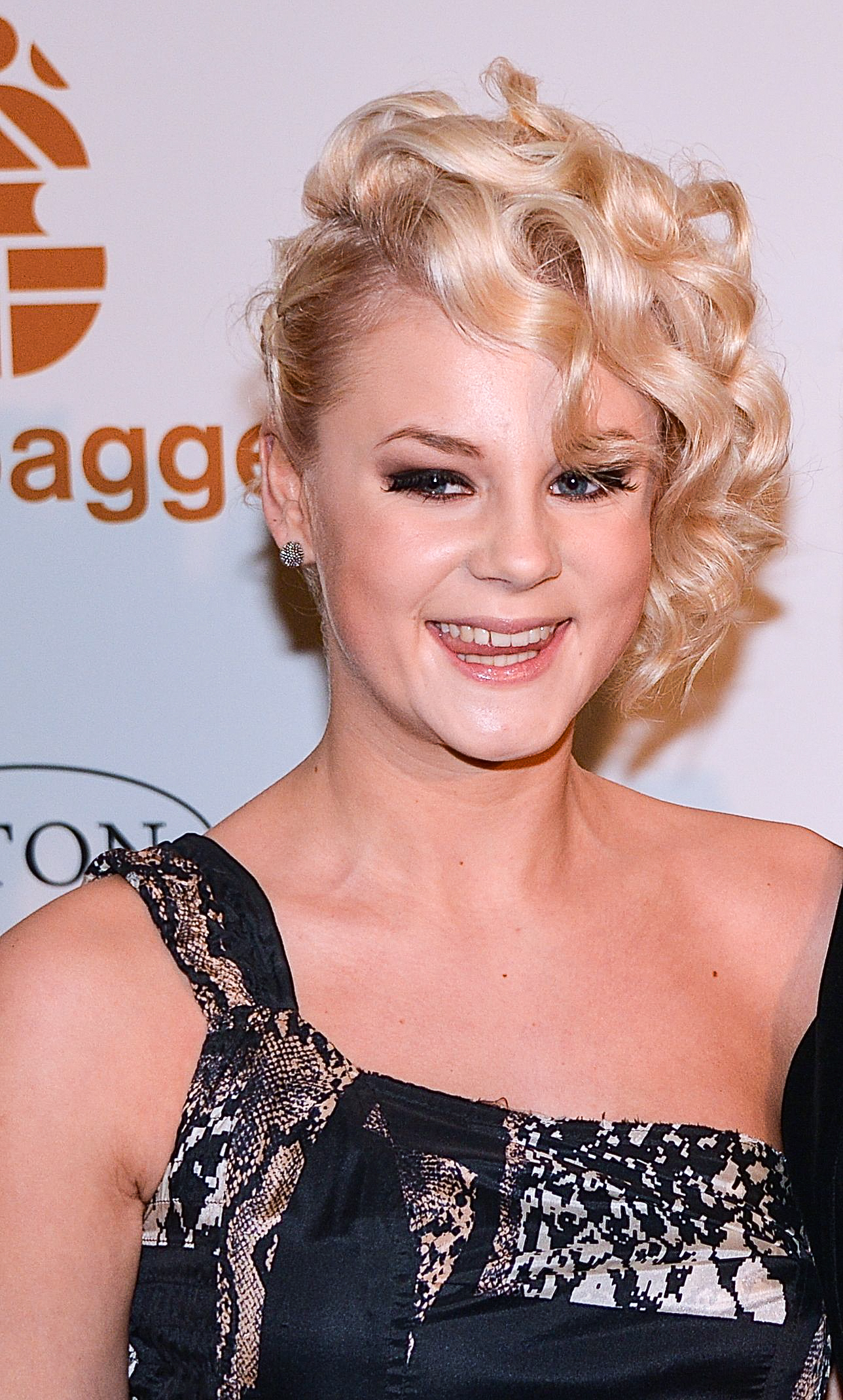
- Nutley in 2013
- Born: 1995 (age 30–31); Stockholm, Sweden
- Occupation: Actress
- Years active: 2009–present
- Parent(s): Colin Nutley; Helena Bergström

Molly Nutley (born 1995) is a Swedish actress.

== Early life ==
She was born in 1995. She is the daughter of actress Helena Bergström and film director Colin Nutley.

== Career ==
Nutley got her first minor role in a film in the film Så olika in 2009, which her mother directed.

She received increased recognition from the film Änglagård – tredje gången gillt, as Alice (who is the daughter of the main character Fanny, played by Bergström).

Nutley was a contestant on Let's Dance 2012, where she placed second, behind footballer Anton Hysén.

She had a major role in Mending Hugo's Heart (2017).

In 2021, she starred in the Swedish film directed by her mother, Dancing Queens.

In 2022, she had the leading role of ”Elin” in the horror film Feed.
