= Sigrid Bernson =

Swedish singer and professional dancer

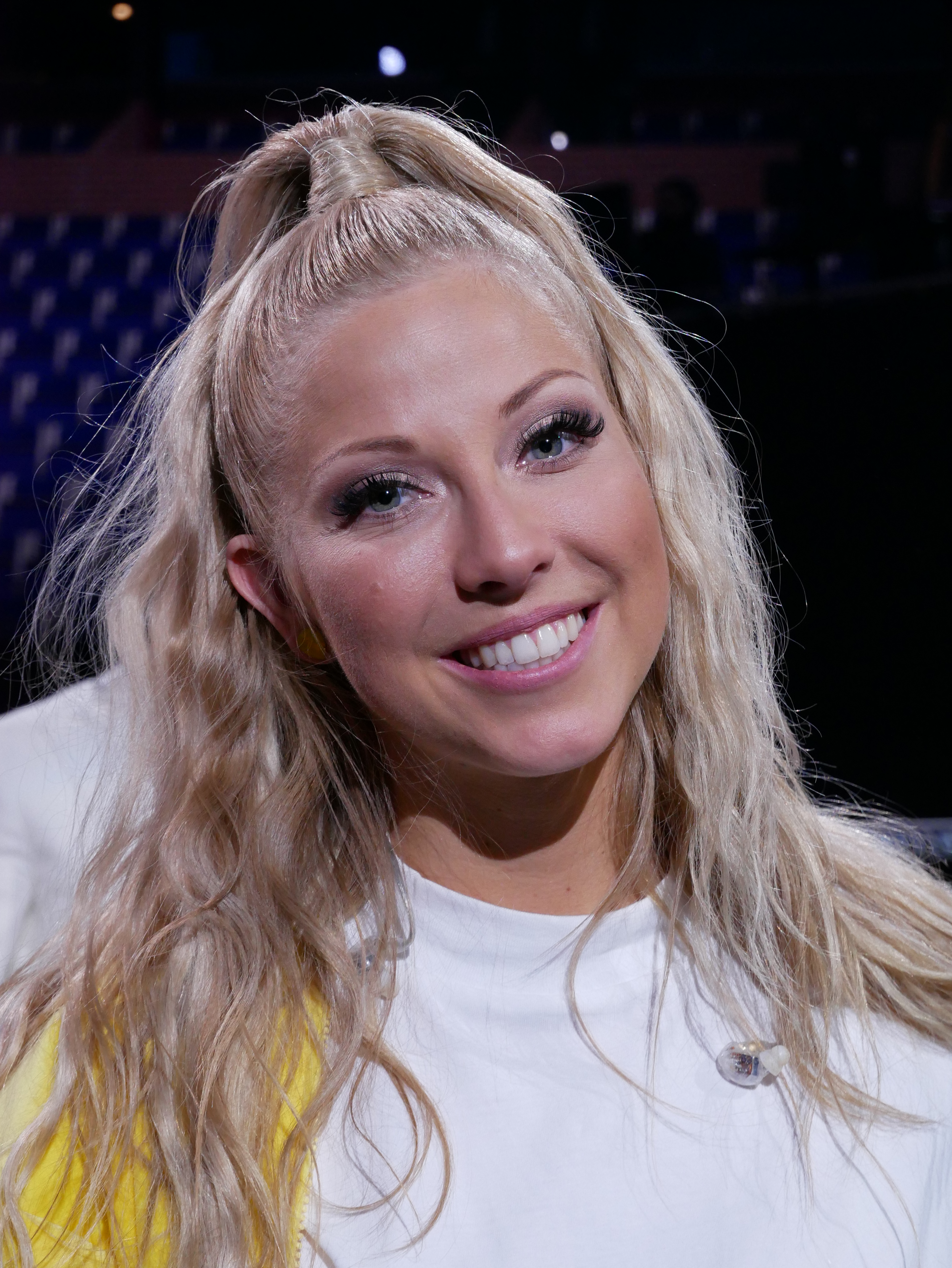
- Sigrid Bernson at Melodifestivalen 2018

Background information
- Born: Sigrid Annamaria Bernson; 28 December 1988 (age 37)
- Genres: Pop
- Occupations: Singer; dancer
- Years active: 2011–present
- Label: Universal Music Sweden

Sigrid Annamaria Bernson (born 28 December 1988) is a Swedish singer and professional dancer. Bernson began her career as one of the professional dancers on the TV4 series Let's Dance in 2011. She won the competition's seventh and ninth seasons, performing with Anton Hysén and Benjamin Ingrosso, respectively.

In 2015, Bernson began a singing career and performed guest vocals on the song "Happy Hours" by John de Sohn. In 2017, she performed her debut solo single "This Summer" on Lotta på Liseberg. She participated in Melodifestivalen 2018 with the song "Patrick Swayze", and qualified to the Andra Chansen round from the first semi-final, where she was eliminated from the competition by DJ Mendez with his song Everyday.

== Discography ==
=== Singles ===
Title	Year	Peak chart positions	Album
Title	Year	SWE	Album
"This Summer"	2017	38	Non-album singles
"Patrick Swayze"	2018	27	Non-album singles
"Skulle dö för dig"	2019	— (Note: "Skulle dö för dig" did not enter the Swedish Singellista Chart, but peaked at number six on the Swedish Heatseeker Chart.)	Non-album singles
