= Hurtig =

Hurtig is a Swedish surname.

== Geographical distribution ==
As of 2014, 48.7% of all known bearers of the surname Hurtig were residents of Sweden (frequency 1:5,620), 18.5% of the United States (1:543,235), 14.4% of Germany (1:154,286), 7.6% of Finland (1:19,988), 4.1% of Canada (1:252,041), 1.2% of Poland (1:844,639) and 1.0% of Norway (1:138,982).

In Sweden, the frequency of the surname was higher than national average (1:5,620) in the following counties:

1. Dalarna County (1:1,794)
2. Jämtland County (1:2,174)
3. Örebro County (1:2,971)
4. Gävleborg County (1:3,836)
5. Södermanland County (1:3,878)
6. Uppsala County (1:4,727)
7. Västra Götaland County (1:4,979)
8. Norrbotten County (1:5,016)
9. Skåne County (1:5,115)

In Finland, the frequency of the surname was higher than national average (1:19,988) in the following regions:

1. Lapland (1:1,203)
2. Tavastia Proper (1:11,143)
3. North Ostrobothnia (1:11,724)
4. Ostrobothnia (1:12,414)

== People ==
- Catarina Hurtig (born 1975), Swedish journalist
- Jules Hurtig (1868–1928), American theatre producer
- Lina Hurtig (born 1995), Swedish footballer
- Lisa Hurtig (born 1987), Swedish football player
- Mel Hurtig (1932–2016), Canadian publisher, writer and politician
- Pär Hurtig (born 1957), Swedish rower
- Ralph Hurtig (1932–2017), Swedish rower
