= 2009 Division 1 (Swedish football) =

Division 1
- Season: 2009
- Champions: Degerfors IF (north); Östers IF (south)
- Promoted: Degerfors IF; IK Brage; Östers IF
- Relegated: Karlslunds IF; Enköpings SK; Skellefteå FF; Motala AIF; IK Oddevold; Lindome GIF
- Top goalscorer: Johan Eklund (21)

The 2009 Division 1 was contested by 28 teams divided into two groups geographically. Degerfors IF and Östers IF won their respective groups, and were thereby qualified for play in the 2010 Superettan. IK Brage who finished second in their group were also promoted after winning their playoff.

== League table ==
=== North ===
Pos	Team	Pld	W	D	L	GF	GA	GD	Pts	Promotion or relegation
1	Degerfors IF (C, P)	26	19	3	4	58	25	+33	60	Promotion to Superettan
2	IK Brage (O, P)	26	16	4	6	47	31	+16	52	Qualification to Promotion playoffs
3	Valsta Syrianska IK	26	14	6	6	54	36	+18	48	
4	Umeå FC	26	14	6	6	51	38	+13	48	
5	Västerås SK	26	11	4	11	49	37	+12	37	
6	Gröndals IK	26	9	8	9	37	43	−6	35	
7	Carlstad United BK	26	9	6	11	30	31	−1	33	
8	Arameiska-Syrianska KIF	26	9	5	12	30	38	−8	32	
9	BK Forward	26	8	7	11	41	45	−4	31	
10	Syrianska IF Kerburan	26	9	4	13	42	48	−6	31	
11	Östersunds FK	26	7	9	10	37	39	−2	30	
12	Karlslunds IF (R)	26	8	5	13	34	42	−8	29	Relegation to Division 2
13	Enköpings SK (R)	26	6	7	13	35	55	−20	25	Relegation to Division 2
14	Skellefteå FF (R)	26	3	6	17	27	64	−37	15	Relegation to Division 2

Source: svenskfotboll.se (in Swedish)
Rules for classification: 1) points; 2) goal difference; 3) number of goals scored.
(C) Champions; (O) Play-off winners; (P) Promoted; (R) Relegated

=== South ===
Pos	Team	Pld	W	D	L	GF	GA	GD	Pts	Promotion or relegation
1	Östers IF (C, P)	26	14	4	8	47	35	+12	46	Promotion to Superettan
2	Skövde AIK	26	14	4	8	44	37	+7	46	Qualification to Promotion playoffs
3	IK Sleipner	26	14	3	9	44	29	+15	45	
4	Kristianstads FF	26	13	6	7	52	41	+11	45	
5	IF Limhamn Bunkeflo	26	11	7	8	41	33	+8	40	
6	Husqvarna FF	26	10	10	6	41	34	+7	40	
7	IFK Värnamo	26	10	8	8	39	36	+3	38	
8	FC Rosengård	26	9	8	9	39	36	+3	35	
9	IF Sylvia	26	9	7	10	38	48	−10	34	
10	Västra Frölunda	26	9	6	11	39	37	+2	33	
11	Torslanda IK	26	8	5	13	32	37	−5	29	
12	Motala AIF (R)	26	9	2	15	28	47	−19	29	Relegation to Division 2
13	IK Oddevold (R)	26	7	4	15	32	44	−12	25	Relegation to Division 2
14	Lindome (R)	26	4	8	14	25	47	−22	20	Relegation to Division 2

Source: svenskfotboll.se (in Swedish)
Rules for classification: 1) points; 2) goal difference; 3) number of goals scored.
(C) Champions; (P) Promoted; (R) Relegated

== Season statistics ==
Northern group top scorers
Rank	Player	Club	Goals
1	(Sweden) Johan Eklund	IK Brage	21
2	(Sweden) Peter Samuelsson	Degerfors IF	17
2	(Bulgaria) Dragomir Draganov	Valsta Syrianska IK	17
4	(Sweden) Danny Persson	Umeå FC	13
5	(Sweden) Johan Bertilsson	Degerfors IF	12
5	(Sweden) Menhal Muqdisi	Syrianska IF Kerburan	12
7	(Sweden) Stellan Carlsson	Karlslunds IF	11
8	(Sweden) Robin Nilsson	Skellefteå FF	10
8	(Sweden) Raby Nahir Youssef	Gröndals IK	10
10	(Sweden) Andreas Hermansson	Umeå FC	9
10	(Sweden) Johan Larsson	Umeå FC	9
10	(Sweden) Andreas Ljunggren Eriksson	Enköpings SK	9

Southern group top scorers
Rank	Player	Club	Goals
1	(Sweden) Jörgen Nilsson	Kristianstads FF	17
2	(Sweden) Jakob Orlov	Skövde AIK	16
3	(Sweden) Niklas Moberg	Östers IF	14
4	(Sweden) Timmy Vilhelmsson	IF Sylvia	13
5	(Sweden) Daniel Leinar	Motala AIF	11
6	(Sweden) Tobias Rickhammar	IK Sleipner	10
7	(Sweden) Bujar Ferizi	IFK Värnamo	9
7	(Sweden) Salif Camara Jönsson	FC Rosengård 1917	9
9	(Sweden) Johan Fäger	Husqvarna FF	8
9	(Kenya) Sunday Eyenga	IK Sleipner	8

== Young Player Teams Of The Year ==
At the end of each Division 1 season an all-star game is played called "Morgondagens Stjärnor" (English: "The Stars Of Tomorrow"). The two teams playing against each other consist of the best young players from each of the two leagues.

Team North
Position	Player	Club
GK	(Sweden) Jonathan Johansson	Skellefteå FF
DF	(Sweden) Olof Bergqvist	Skellefteå FF
DF	(Sweden) Martin Broberg	Degerfors IF
DF	(Sweden) Joakim Cassepierre	Östersunds FK
DF	(Sweden) Daniel Jarl	Enköpings SK
DF	(Sweden) Robbin Sellin	IK Brage
DF	(Peru) Claudio Rojas Flores	Gröndals IK
MF / FW	(Sweden) Emil Berger	Degerfors IF
MF / FW	(Sweden) Anders Bååth	Gröndals IK
MF / FW	(Sweden) Josef Ibrahim	BK Forward
MF / FW	(Sweden) Daniel Sleyman	Arameiska-Syrianska KIF
MF / FW	(Iraq) Ahmed Yasin	BK Forward
MF / FW	(Nigeria) Sunday Abowho	Valsta Syrianska IK
MF / FW	(Sweden) Pontus Hindrikes	IK Brage
MF / FW	(Sweden) Timothy McNeil	Umeå FC
MF / FW	(Sweden) Johannes Gustafsson	BK Forward
Coach	(Sweden) Patrik Werner	Degerfors IF
Coach	(Sweden) Lennart Andersson	IK Brage

Team South
Position	Player	Club
GK	(Sweden) David Asmar	Västra Frölunda IF
DF	(Sweden) Muhamet Ahmeti	Kristianstads FF
DF	(Sweden) Jonatan Ask	Lindome GIF
DF	(Sweden) Martin Holm	IF Limhamn Bunkeflo
DF	(Sweden) Christopher Lenning	Torslanda IK
DF	(Sweden) Elmin Nurkić	Östers IF
DF	(Sweden) Adam Rosén	Skövde AIK
MF / FW	(Sweden) Alexander Angelin	Västra Frölunda IF
MF / FW	(Sweden) Erdin Demir	IF Limhamn Bunkeflo
MF / FW	(Sweden) Matteo Blomqvist-Zampi	Östers IF
MF / FW	(Sweden) Alexander Henningsson	Östers IF
MF / FW	(Sweden) Esat Jashari	IK Sleipner
MF / FW	(Sweden) Joakim Edström	Västra Frölunda IF
MF / FW	(Sweden) Johan Frisk	Östers IF
Coach	(Sweden) Stefan Jakobsson	Skövde AIK
Coach	(Sweden) Tor-Arne Fredheim	IK Sleipner
