= Carl Hysén =

Swedish association football player

Personal information
- Full name: Carl Oskar Hysén
- Date of birth: 12 July 1911
- Place of birth: Härryda, Sweden
- Date of death: 12 February 1992 (aged 80)
- Position: Left back

Senior career*
| Years | Team | Apps | (Gls) |
| 1932–1937 | IFK Göteborg | 73 | (4) |
- * Club domestic league appearances and goals

Carl Oskar Hysén (12 July 1911 – 12 February 1992) was a Swedish footballer who played as a left back. He played for IFK Göteborg between 1926 and 1938.

== Personal life ==
Hysén was the brother of Erik Hysén, the great-uncle of Glenn Hysén, and the great-great uncle of Tobias Hysén, Alexander Hysén, and Antonio Hysén.

== Honours ==
IFK Göteborg

- Allsvenskan: 1934–35
