= Hysen =

Hysen is a male given name and a surname and may refer to:

== Given name ==
- Hysen Bytyqi (born 1968), Kosovan animal scientist
- Hysen Dedja (born 1960), Albanian footballer and manager
- Hysen Hakani (1932–2011), Albanian film director and screenwriter
- Hysen Hoxha (1861–1934), Albanian politician
- Hysen Memolla (born 1992), Albanian association football player
- Hysen Osmanaj (born 1957), member of the Central Election Commission of Albania
- Hysen Pulaku (born 1992), Albanian Weightlifter
- Hysen Vrioni (1881–1944), Albanian politician
- Hysen Zmijani (born 1963), Albanian soccer player

== Surname ==
- see Hysén

== See also ==
- Hysen Pasha Mosque
