= Bildt =

Bildt may refer to:

== People ==
- Bildt family, an old Norwegian-Danish-Swedish noble family traditionally domiciled in Bohus county
- Anna Maria Corazza Bildt (born 1963), Italian-Swedish politician; married to Carl Bildt
- Daniel Knudsen Bildt (1602–1651), Dano-Norwegian military officer
- Daniel Bildt (1792–1827), Swedish Army lieutenant colonel
  - Gillis Bildt (1820–1894), Swedish politician, Prime Minister 1888–1889
    - Carl Bildt (1850–1931), Swedish diplomat
      - Harald Bildt (1876–1947), Swedish diplomat
      - Didrik Bildt (1879–1933), Swedish explorer
    - Knut Gillis Bildt (1854–1927), Swedish Army general and politician
      - Nils Bildt (1889–1969), Swedish Army officer
        - Daniel Bildt (1920–2010), Swedish bureau director
          - Carl Bildt (born 1949), Swedish politician and diplomat, Prime Minister 1991–1994
- Inger Thorén (née Bildt), Swedish engineer and food chemist, in 1938, the first woman assistant appointed at KTH Royal Institute of Technology.

== Other uses ==
- Het Bildt, a municipality in the northern Netherlands
- Bildts, the dialect spoken in Het Bildt

== See also ==
- Bild (disambiguation)
