= Patrick Swayze (song) =

Single by Sigrid Bernson
- Released: 26 February 2018
- Recorded: 2017
- Length: 3:00
- Label: Universal Music Sweden
- Songwriter(s): Andrej Kamnik; Josefin Glenmark; Peg Parnevik; Sigrid Bernson

Sigrid Bernson singles chronology
"This Summer" (2017)	"Patrick Swayze" (2018)

"Patrick Swayze" is a song recorded by Swedish singer Sigrid Bernson. The song was released as a digital download in Sweden on 26 February 2018 and peaked at number 27 on the Swedish Singles Chart. It is taking part in Melodifestivalen 2018, and qualified to andra chansen from the first semi-final on 3 February 2018. It was written by Andrej Kamnik, Josefin Glenmark, Peg Parnevik, and Bernson.

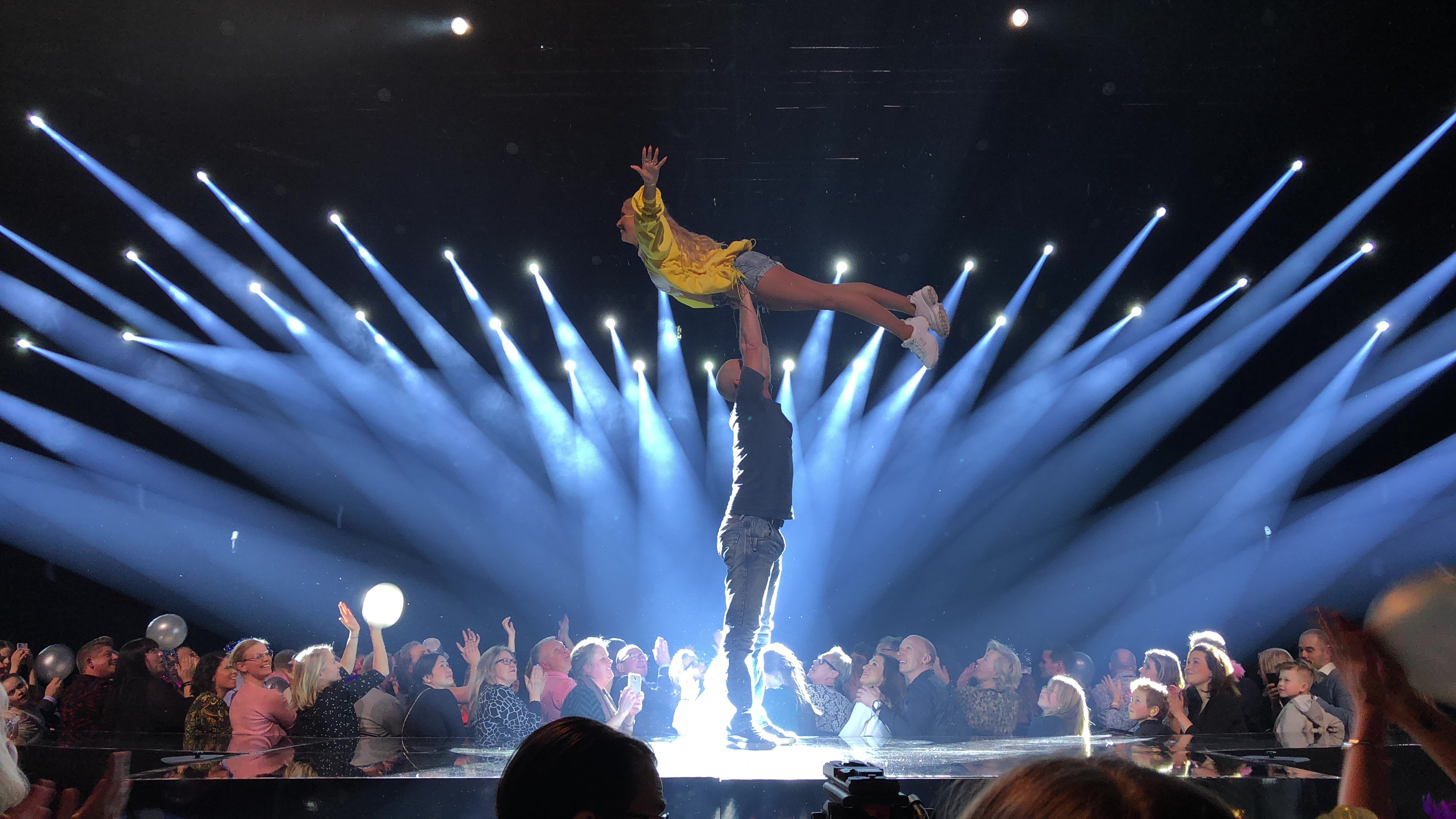
Final scene of "Patrick Swayze" at Melodifestivalen 2018 in Karlstad.

== Track listing ==
Digital download
No.	Title	Length
1.	"Patrick Swayze"	3:00
2.	"Patrick Swayze" (instrumental)	3:00

== Charts ==
Chart (2018)	Peak position
Sweden (Sverigetopplistan)	27

== Release history ==
Region	Date	Format	Label
Sweden	26 February 2018	Digital download	Universal Music Sweden
