= IF Warta =

Swedish football club

- Full name: Idrottsföreningen Warta
- Nickname: IFW
- Founded: 1929
- Ground: Sälöfjordsplan; Hisingen; Gothenburg; Sweden
- Chairman: Roland Jonsson
- League: Division 5
- 2021: Division 5 Göteborg B 9th
Home colours	Away colours

IF Warta is a Swedish football club located in Hisingen, Gothenburg.

== Background ==
Idrottsföreningen Warta, a football club from Hisingen in Gothenburg, was founded in 1929. The name Warta is said to be named after a rusty old boat that was moored at Sannegårdshamnen, Lindholmen (in Gothenburg), at the time when the club was founded. The club's most famous player is Glenn Hysén who began his career with IF Warta as a youngster.

Since their foundation IF Warta has participated mainly in the middle divisions of the Swedish football league system. The club currently plays in Division 3 Nordvästra Götaland which is the fifth tier of Swedish football. The club spent 4 seasons in Division 2, then the third tier of Swedish football, in 1987 and from 1989 to 1991. They play their home matches at the Sälöfjordsplan in Göteborg.

IF Warta are affiliated to Göteborgs Fotbollförbund.

== Recent history ==
In recent seasons IF Warta have competed in the following divisions:

2021 – Division V, Göteborg B
2020 – Division V, Göteborg B
2019 – Division V, Göteborg B
2018 – Division V, Göteborg B
2017 – Division VI, Göteborg D
2016 – Division VI, Göteborg D
2015 – Division V, Göteborg A
2014 – Division IV, Göteborg A
2013 – Division IV, Göteborg A
2012 – Division IV, Göteborg A
2011 – Division III, Nordvästra Götaland
2010 – Division III, Nordvästra Götaland
2009 – Division III, Nordvästra Götaland
2008 – Division III, Nordvästra Götaland
2007 – Division IV, Göteborg B
2006 – Division IV, Göteborg B
2005 – Division IV, Göteborg B
2004 – Division IV, Göteborg B
2003 – Division IV, Göteborg B
2002 – Division IV, Göteborg B
2001 – Division IV, Göteborg B
2000 – Division IV, Göteborg B
1999 – Division IV, Göteborg B
1998 – Division IV, Göteborg B
1997 – Division IV, Göteborg B
1996 – Division IV, Göteborg B
1995 – Division IV, Göteborg B
1994 – Division IV, Göteborg B
1993 – Division IV, Göteborg B

== Attendances ==
In recent seasons IF Warta have had the following average attendances:

Season	Average attendance	Division / Section	Level
2007	Not available	Div 4 Göteborg B	Tier 6
2008	105	Div 3 Nordvästra Götaland	Tier 5
2009	130	Div 3 Nordvästra Götaland	Tier 5
2010	85	Div 3 Nordvästra Götaland	Tier 5
2011	65	Div 3 Nordvästra Götaland	Tier 5
2012	69	Div 4 Göteborg A	Tier 6
2013	66	Div 4 Göteborg A	Tier 6
2014	47	Div 4 Göteborg A	Tier 6
2015	53	Div 5 Göteborg A	Tier 7
2016	30	Div 6 Göteborg D	Tier 8
2017	131	Div 6 Göteborg D	Tier 8
2018	40	Div 5 Göteborg B	Tier 7

* Attendances are provided in the Publikliga sections of the Svenska Fotbollförbundet website.
