= Fredrik Bild =

Swedish footballer (born 1974)

Fredrik Bild (born 25 June 1974) is a Swedish retired football defender, who played for Östers IF.

He also represented IFK Norrköping in Allsvenskan.

He is the brother of Andreas Bild, son of Per-Olof Bild and grand nephew of Harry Bild.
