= Andreas Bild =

Swedish footballer (born 1971)

Personal information
- Full name: Per Andreas Bild
- Date of birth: 3 October 1971 (age 55)
- Height: 1.70 m (5 ft 7 in)
- Position: Defensive midfielder

Senior career*
Years	Team	Apps	(Gls)
1991–1998	Östers IF	174	(29)
1999–2001	Hammarby IF	54	(3)
2002–2004	IF Brommapojkarna	69	(6)
Total		297	(38)

International career
1987–1988	Sweden U17	10	(3)
1989–1991	Sweden U19	20	(8)
1992	Sweden U21	4	(2)
1997	Sweden	2	(0)
- * Club domestic league appearances and goals

Per Andreas Bild (born 3 October 1971) is a Swedish former professional footballer who played as a defensive midfielder. He won the 2001 Allsvenskan with Hammarby IF and appeared twice for the Sweden national team.

== Club career ==
He played for Östers IF (1991–1998), Hammarby IF (1999–2001), and IF Brommapojkarna (2002–2004). He scored twice as he helped Hammarby win the 2001 Allsvenskan.

== International career ==
Bild won a total of 34 youth caps for the Sweden U17, U19, and U21 teams. He made his full international debut for Sweden in a friendly game against Thailand on 11 February 1997, when he played for 64 minutes before being replaced by Anders Andersson. He won his second and final cap for Sweden in a friendly game against Japan on 13 February 1997 when he came on as a substitute for Peter Wibrån in the 86th minute.

== Honours ==
Hammarby

• Allsvenskan: 2001

== Personal life ==
He is the brother of Fredrik Bild, son of Per-Olof Bild and grand nephew of Harry Bild.
