= Dancing Queens (film) =

2021 Swedish film

- Film poster
- Directed by: Helena Bergström
- Screenplay by: Helena Bergström; Denize Karabuda
- Produced by: Joana Sorobetea
- Starring: Molly Nutley; Fredrik Quiñones; Marie Göranzon; Mattias Nordkvist
- Cinematography: Peter Mokrosinski
- Edited by: Emil Stenberg; Malin Lindström
- Music by: Gaute Storaas
- Production company: Sweetwater Production
- Distributed by: Netflix
- Release date: June 3, 2021
- Running time: 110 minutes
- Country: Sweden
- Language: Swedish

Dancing Queens is a 2021 Swedish comedy-drama film directed by Helena Bergström, written by Bergström and Denize Karabuda. It stars Molly Nutley, Fredrik Quiñones, Marie Göranzon, and Mattias Nordkvist.

== Plot ==
Dylan Pettersson, a 23-year-old young woman from a small island in the Bohuslän archipelago, aspires to be a professional dancer. She's talked into covering cleaning duties at the struggling gay drag club Queens for a week. There, Victor, the club's star dancer and choreographer, discovers Dylan's talent, and she desperately wants to be a dancer on the show, but she's a girl — and it's a drag show.

== Cast ==
- Molly Nutley as Dylan Pettersson
- Fredrik Quiñones as Victor
- Marie Göranzon as Margareta
- Mattias Nordkvist as Kenneth Petterson
- Claes Malmberg as Tommy La Diva
- Christopher Wollter as Micke Seth
- Emil Almén as Magnus
- Razmus Nyström as Sasha
- André Christenson as Joel
- Louie Indriana as Hassan

== Release ==
Dancing Queens was digitally released by Netflix on June 3, 2021.

== Reception ==
On the review aggregator website Rotten Tomatoes, 33% of critics' reviews are positive, with an average rating of 4.9/10.
