= Johan Eklund =

Swedish footballer

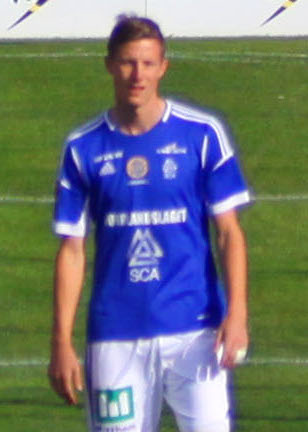

Personal information
- Full name: Johan Olof Peter Eklund
- Date of birth: 30 May 1984 (age 42)
- Place of birth: Falun, Sweden
- Height: 1.93 m (6 ft 4 in)
- Position: Forward

Team information
- Current team: IK Brage

Youth career
- Falu BS

Senior career*
Years	Team	Apps	(Gls)
2004	IK Brage	2	(0)
2005–2006	Falu BS	48	(15)
2007	Falu FK	26	(8)
2008–2011	IK Brage	100	(48)
2012–2016	GIF Sundsvall	130	(43)
2017–	IK Brage	0	(0)
- * Club domestic league appearances and goals as of 5 February 2017 (UTC)

Johan Eklund (born 30 May 1984) is a Swedish footballer who plays for IK Brage as a forward.

== Career ==
Eklund grew up in Falun where he started out playing for hometown club Falu BS which later turned into Falu FK. In his youth he was also a Team handball and Floorball player before deciding to invest all his time into football at age 15 or 16. In 2008, he was signed by IK Brage to play as a defensive midfielder but was soon moved back into his natural forward position. There he had an extremely successful year in 2009 where he scored 21 goals in 23 games and helped his team win promotion to second tier Superettan. The following year he also became a top ten goalscorer of the 2010 Superettan.

== Career statistics ==
As of 9 December 2014

Club performance			League		Cup		Continental		Total	
Season	Club	League	Apps	Goals	Apps	Goals	Apps	Goals	Apps	Goals
Sweden			League		Svenska Cupen		Europe		Total	
2004	IK Brage	Superettan	2	0	—		—		2	0
2005	Falu BS	Division 2	22	11	—		—		22	11
2006	Falu BS	Division 1	26	4	—		—		26	4
2007	Falu FK	Division 1	26	8	—		—		26	8
2008	IK Brage	Division 1	21	7	—		—		21	7
2009	IK Brage	Division 1	23	21	—		—		23	21
2010	IK Brage	Superettan	29	11	—		—		29	11
2011	IK Brage	Superettan	27	9	—		—		27	9
2012	GIF Sundsvall	Allsvenskan	26	5	—		—		26	5
2013	GIF Sundsvall	Superettan	30	15	4	1	—		34	16
2014	GIF Sundsvall	Superettan	28	16	3	1	—		31	17
Career total			260	108	7	2	—		267	110
