= Kändisdjungeln =

- Season 1
- Presented by: David Hellenius and Tilde de Paula
- No. of days: 16
- No. of contestants: 11
- Winner: Karl Petter Bergvall
- Runner-up: Jannike Björling
- Location: Taman Negara, Malaysia
- No. of episodes: 16

Release
- Original network: TV4
- Original release: 11 September – 27 September 2009

Kändisdjungeln (English: The Celebrity Jungle) was the first and only season of the Swedish version of I'm a Celebrity...Get Me Out of Here!. The first of the 16 episodes was broadcast on 11 September 2009. The show's hosts were David Hellenius and Tilde de Paula. The celebrities were sent to the Malaysian jungle for the show's run. Sweden was the first Scandinavian country to broadcast its own version of the format.

== Celebrities ==
The contestants participating in the show were:

Celebrity	Age	Known for	Status
Karl Petter Bergvall	26	Reality show participant	Winner on 27 September 2009
Jannike Björling	42	Model	Runner-up on 27 September 2009
Mikkey Dee	45	Motörhead drummer	Third place on 26 September 2009
Inger Nilsson	50	Actor	Eliminated 7th on 25 September 2009
Kennet Andersson	41	Footballer	Eliminated 6th on 24 September 2009
Ann Söderlund	37	Journalist	Eliminated 5th on 23 September 2009
Thorleif Torstensson	60	Musician	Eliminated 4th on 22 September 2009
Rafael Edholm	43	Actor	Eliminated 3rd on 21 September 2009
Catarina Hurtig	35	Royal correspondent	Eliminated 2nd on 20 September 2009
Katarina Hultling	54	Sports reporter	Eliminated 1st on 19 September 2009
Bengt Frithiofsson	70	Wine expert	Withdrew (Note: Camp leader Bengt was forced to quit on medical grounds.) on 15 September 2009

== Reception ==
Björn Borg's wife Patricia Östfeldt-Borg withdrew from participating in the show prior to its launch, and the final list of celebrities was described in Aftonbladet by one critic as unimpressive. In terms of viewership the show was a flop, as whilst the first episode received viewership of 1.2 million, by the middle of the series viewership had already fallen to 322,000. 62% of the readers of the newspaper Expressen voted the premiere of the show a "disaster".
