= Jonas Källström =

Swedish footballer

Personal information
- Date of birth: 23 September 1963 (age 63)
- Position: Midfielder

Youth career
- IFK Hedemora

Senior career*
Years	Team	Apps	(Gls)
- Krylbo IF
1986	Säters IF		
1987–1993	IK Brage		

Managerial career
- Säters IF
- Korsnäs IF Dam (assistant coach)
- * Club domestic league appearances and goals

Jonas Källström (born 23 September 1963) is a Swedish former footballer who played as a midfielder. He made 98 Allsvenskan appearances for IK Brage and scored six goals. For IK Brage, he also made two appearances in the 1988–89 UEFA Cup.

He is the brother of Swedish footballer Mikael Källström and the uncle of Swedish international footballer Kim Källström.
