= Erik Svensson (footballer) =

Swedish footballer

Personal information
- Full name: Erik Svensson
- Date of birth: 16 April 1903
- Date of death: 1942 (aged 38–39)
- Position: Forward

Senior career*
Years	Team	Apps	(Gls)
1923–1935	Malmö FF	98	(51)
- * Club domestic league appearances and goals

Erik "Kick" Svensson (16 April 1903 – 1942) was a Swedish footballer who played his entire career at Malmö FF as a forward.

Svensson's son, Lennart Svensson (born 1934), made nearly 200 appearances for Malmö FF as a midfielder.
