= Lennart Svensson (footballer) =

Swedish footballer (1934–2025)

Personal information
- Full name: Lennart Tore Erik Svensson
- Date of birth: 18 November 1934
- Place of birth: Malmö, Sweden
- Date of death: 22 October 2025 (aged 90)
- Place of death: Malmö, Sweden
- Position: Midfielder

Senior career*
Years	Team	Apps	(Gls)
1956–1966	Malmö FF	183	(34)

International career
1960–1962	Sweden	2	(0)
- * Club domestic league appearances and goals

Lennart Svensson (18 November 1934 – 22 October 2025) was a Swedish footballer who played his entire career at Malmö FF as a midfielder. He was capped twice by Sweden.

He is known as "Lill-Kick" after his father, Erik "Kick" Svensson (1903–1942), who made nearly 100 appearances for Malmö FF as a forward.
