= Catarina Hurtig =

Swedish journalist and author

- Born: Anna Catarina Helena Hurtig; 2 March 1975

Catarina Hurtig (born 2 March 1975) is a Swedish journalist and author and a participant in the first season of the TV show Kändisdjungeln (2009), Sweden's version of I'm a Celebrity...Get Me Out of Here! That same year, Hurtig also attained notability when she was the first to break the news of Prince Carl Philip's separation from his then-girlfriend on her now-defunct blog "Ladylike."

Hurtig began working as a royal correspondent in 1999 and has followed the royals ever since. She has been a guest at several royal weddings and traveled with Victoria and the Crown Princess of Sweden to Uganda, Ethiopia, Lithuania and Japan. She also participated in the King and Queen of Sweden's state visits to the King and Queen of Thailand, as well as to the Sultan of Brunei. She has also written several books on European Royalty.

== Bibliography ==
- Uppdrag: Prinsessa, Bonnier Fakta, Stockholm, Sweden 2006. ISBN 91-85015-80-6 (inb.). Libris 10017430.
- H.K.H. Victoria: ett personligt porträtt, Norstedt, Stockholm, Sweden 2010. ISBN 978-91-1-302780-7 (inb.). Libris 11746171.
- Det kungliga året 2008, Natur & Kultur, Stockholm, Sweden 2008. ISBN 91-27-11673-5 (inb.). Libris 10654093.
- Prinsessor i Skandinavien, Adelphi Audio, Stockholm, Sweden 2010. ISBN 91-86303-80-5 (audiobook). Libris 11829077.
- Prinsessor, Pocketförlaget, Stockholm, Sweden 2007. ISBN 978-91-85625-54-3. Libris 10417320.
- H.K.H. Victoria: ett personligt porträtt, Norstedt, Stockholm, Sweden 2010. ISBN 978-91-1-302780-7 (inb.). Libris 11746171.
- Yrke: prinsesse, Gyldendal, Oslo 2007. ISBN 978-82-05-36755-5.
- Profession: prinsesse, People's Press, Copenhagen 2007. ISBN 978-87-7055-094-9.
- Profession: prinsesse, Den Grimme Ælling, Copenhagen 2007. (audiobook)
- Todelliset prinsessat, Otava, Helsinki, Soumi 2007. ISBN 978-951-1-21526-4.
- Prinsessen, A.W. Bruna Uitgevers, Utrecht, Netherlands 2007. ISBN 978-90-229-9342-2.
- Päris printsessid, Kirjastus Kunst, Tallinn, Estonia 2009. ISBN 978-9949-437-40-5
- Европейские принцессы, Катарина Хартиг, Амфора,(Amphora), St Petersburg, Russia 2009. ISBN 978-5-367-01128-9
