= Bengt Frithiofsson =

Swedish wine writer (1939–2024)

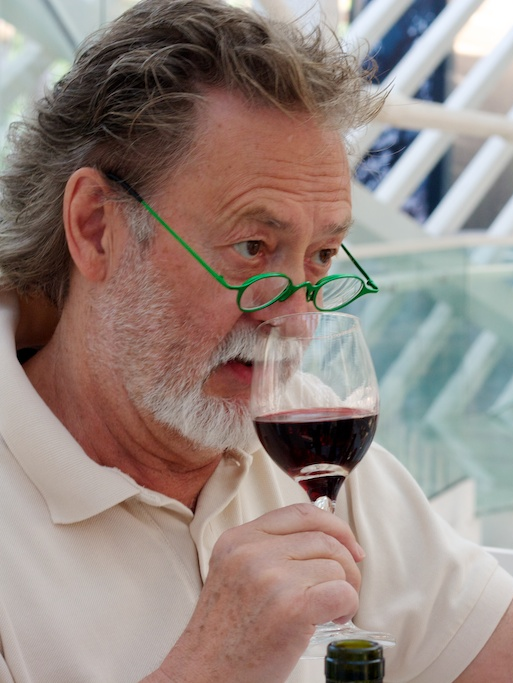
- Frithiofsson in 2010
- Born: 25 August 1939; Landskrona, Sweden
- Died: 28 September 2024 (aged 85)

Bengt Frithiofsson (25 August 1939 – 28 September 2024) was a Swedish wine writer. He initially worked for various Swedish newspapers, and later became a wine and food writer for Svenska Dagbladet for 20 years. In the 1990s he moved to TV4 and the morning show Nyhetsmorgon.

Frithiofsson has also written a number of food and wine books. His first restaurant guide was published in 1977 and his first wine guide in 1983.

In 2009, he appeared in the first season of Kändisdjungeln (The Celebrity Jungle), the Swedish version of I'm a Celebrity...Get Me Out of Here!.

Frithiofsson died on 28 September 2024, at the age of 85.
