= Hysen Osmanaj =

Albanian politician

Member of Albanian Election Commission
- In office 2 February 2009 – 2013
- Nominated by: Democratic Party
- Appointed by: Assembly of the Republic of Albania

Personal details
- Born: 03.10.1957 Tirana, Albania

Hysen Bajram Osmanaj (born 3 October 1957) is member of the Central Election Commission of Albania for the Democratic Party of Albania.
