= Hänt Bild =

Swedish celebrity magazine

Hänt Bild is a celebrity magazine published in Stockholm, Sweden. The magazine was started in 2003. It is part of Aller Media AB. It is published on a weekly basis.
