= Tony Martinsson =

Swedish former football player

Personal information
- Date of birth: 27 November 1966 (age 59)
- Position: Midfielder

Senior career*
Years	Team	Apps	(Gls)
- IFK Norrköping
- * Club domestic league appearances and goals

Tony Martinsson (born 27 November 1966) is a Swedish former footballer and coach. He played for IFK Norrköping in 1989, when they became Swedish champions. After his career he took over as the coach of IF Sylvia. He has worked as director of IFK Norrköping's youth academy.
