= Glenn Hysén =

Swedish footballer and manager

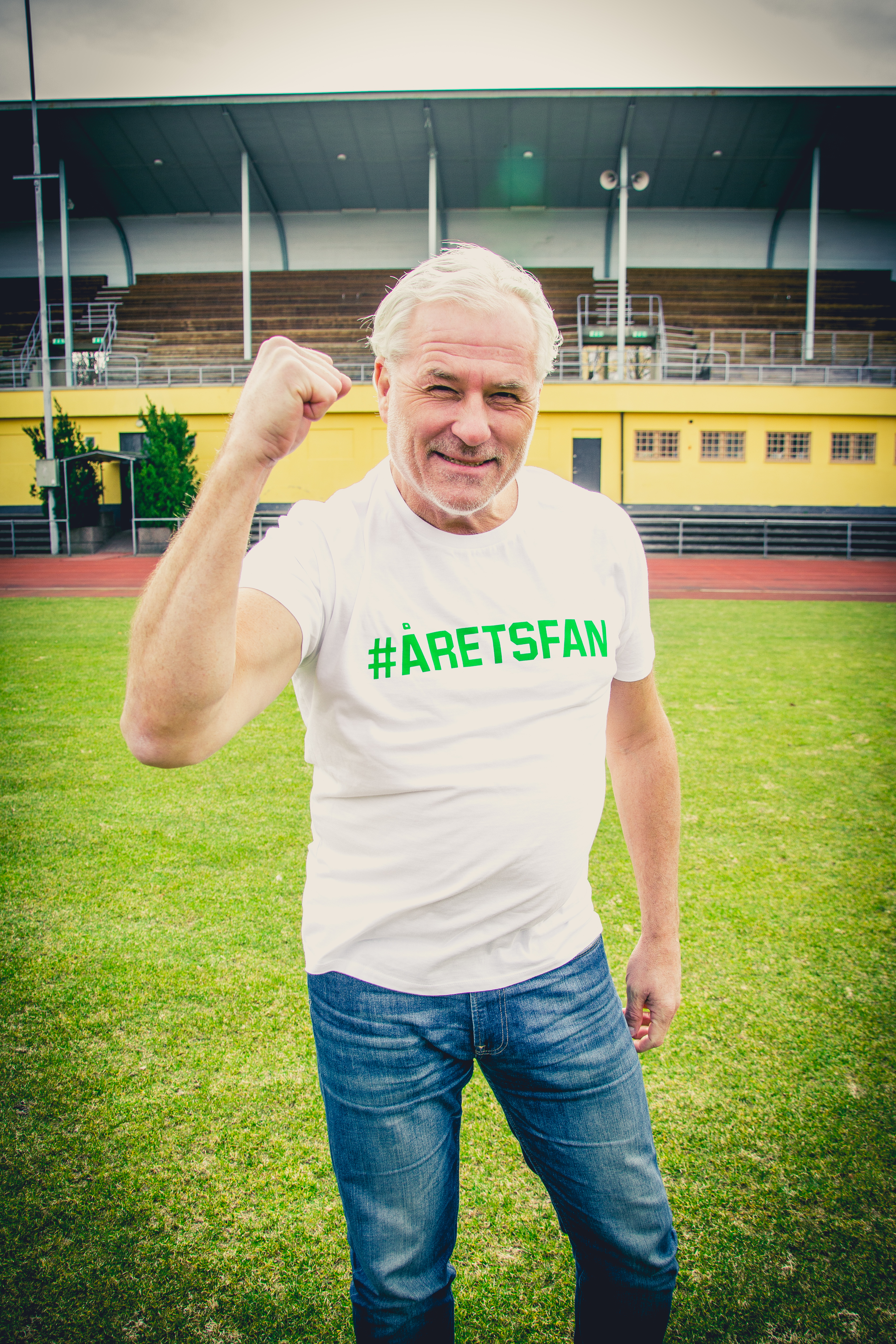
- Hysén in 2015

Personal information
- Full name: Glenn Ingvar Hysén
- Date of birth: 30 October 1959 (age 67)
- Place of birth: Gothenburg, Sweden
- Height: 1.84 m (6 ft 0 in)
- Position: Defender

Youth career
- –1978: IF Warta

Senior career*
Years	Team	Apps	(Gls)
1978–1983	IFK Göteborg	122	(8)
1983–1985	PSV Eindhoven	48	(12)
1985–1987	IFK Göteborg	38	(5)
1987–1989	Fiorentina	63	(1)
1989–1992	Liverpool	72	(2)
1992–1994	GAIS	54	(2)
Total		397	(30)

International career
1976	Sweden U16	3	(1)
1976–1977	Sweden U18	17	(0)
1980	Sweden U21	5	(0)
1981–1990	Sweden	68	(7)

Managerial career
- 2002–2004: Torslanda IK (assistant manager)
- 2010–2012: Utsiktens BK
- * Club domestic league appearances and goals

Glenn Ingvar Hysén (pronounced [hʏˈseːn]; born 30 October 1959) is a Swedish former professional footballer who played as a defender. Starting off his career with IFK Göteborg in 1978, he went on represent PSV Eindhoven, Fiorentina, and Liverpool before retiring at GAIS in 1994. A full international between 1981 and 1990, he won 68 caps for the Sweden national team and represented his country at the 1990 FIFA World Cup. He was awarded Guldbollen as Sweden's best footballer of the year in both 1983 and 1988.

== Early life ==
Glenn Ingvar Hysén was born in Gothenburg to a football family. His grandfather Erik Hysén played for IFK Göteborg as did his great-uncle Carl Hysén. Hysén's father Kurt Hysén also played for IFK Göteborg's B-Team. Hysén started playing football at IF Warta when he was a boy. As a child, he wanted to become a member of Swedish pop group ABBA.

== Club career ==
=== IFK Göteborg ===
Hysén started his professional career with IFK Göteborg and made his competitive debut for the team on 14 May 1979 in an Allsvenskan game against IFK Norrköping that ended 2–2. During his first stint with Göteborg, he helped the team win the 1982 and 1983 Swedish Championships, and the 1981–82 UEFA Cup.

=== PSV Eindhoven ===
He was named Sweden's Footballer of the Year in 1983 and his form earned him a move to PSV Eindhoven in the Netherlands. He was often forced to play out of position, midfielder and even as a forward, and did not enjoy his time in the Netherlands.

=== Return to IFK Göteborg ===
In 1985, he returned to IFK Göteborg and helped the team reach the semi-finals of the 1985–86 European Cup before being eliminated by FC Barcelona on penalty kicks. He also helped the club win another Swedish Championship in 1987 and win their second UEFA Cup title in 1987.

=== Fiorentina ===
Following his success with IFK Göteborg and the Sweden national team, Hysén turned down an offer from Manchester United and their manager Alex Ferguson to instead join his former IFK Göteborg manager Sven-Göran Eriksson at Fiorentina in Serie A.

=== Liverpool ===
Manchester United again expressed an interest in signing Hysén in 1989, and invited the player over to England for a tour of Old Trafford and buffet lunch. He returned to Italy with the deal all but sealed; Manchester United chairman Martin Edwards even rang Alex Ferguson to report that Hysén had shaken hands on the deal. Negotiations stalled on the £300,000 transfer, and Edwards and Ferguson flew out to Italy to conclude matters in person. However, upon arrival in Florence, they were told by Hysén's agent that the player had signed for Liverpool a few days previously, prompting the United management to make a move for Gary Pallister instead.

Hysén made a sensational debut against Arsenal in the 1989 Charity Shield win at Wembley which made him an instant hero. Hysén settled in immediately at Liverpool, scoring his first Liverpool goal in their club record 9–0 mauling of Crystal Palace soon afterwards. He scored Liverpool's eighth goal in this game, which was notable for having eight different players score for the same side.

Alongside veteran club captain Alan Hansen and, in Hansen's injury-enforced absence, the young defender Gary Ablett, Hysén was a major part of Liverpool's success in the League championship of the 1989–90 season, when the Reds fought off a late challenge from Aston Villa and sealed their 18th top division title by a margin of nine points.

It went slightly downhill for Hysén thereafter, with Hansen out with a long-term injury (which led to his retirement). Manager Kenny Dalglish's resignation in February 1991 heralded the beginning of Hysén's end. The new manager Graeme Souness did not really share Dalglish's views on football which led to many changes being made upon his arrival, changes that did not suit the entire team and created some tension between him and some of the players, Hysén being one of those players. This tension together with some minor injuries made Souness less keen to keep him. Hysén did recover fitness for the 1991–92 season, but made just five league appearances, the last a 3–0 loss to Norwich City 22 February 1992, before being given a free transfer.

=== GAIS and retirement ===
He returned to Sweden in 1992 and played three seasons for GAIS before retiring from professional football in 1994.

== International career ==
Hysén represented the Sweden U17, U19, and U21 teams a total of 25 times between 1976 and 1980. He made his full international debut for the Sweden national team on 6 March 1981 against Northern Ireland. He continued to play for the Sweden national team for the next nine years. In a 1990 FIFA World Cup qualification match on 19 October 1988 against England at Wembley Stadium, Hysén was awarded six "wasps" out of five by Expressen for a heroic defensive performance. Hysén captained Sweden at the 1990 FIFA World Cup in Italy, when they lost all three of their first-round matches and went home surprisingly early.

== Coaching career ==
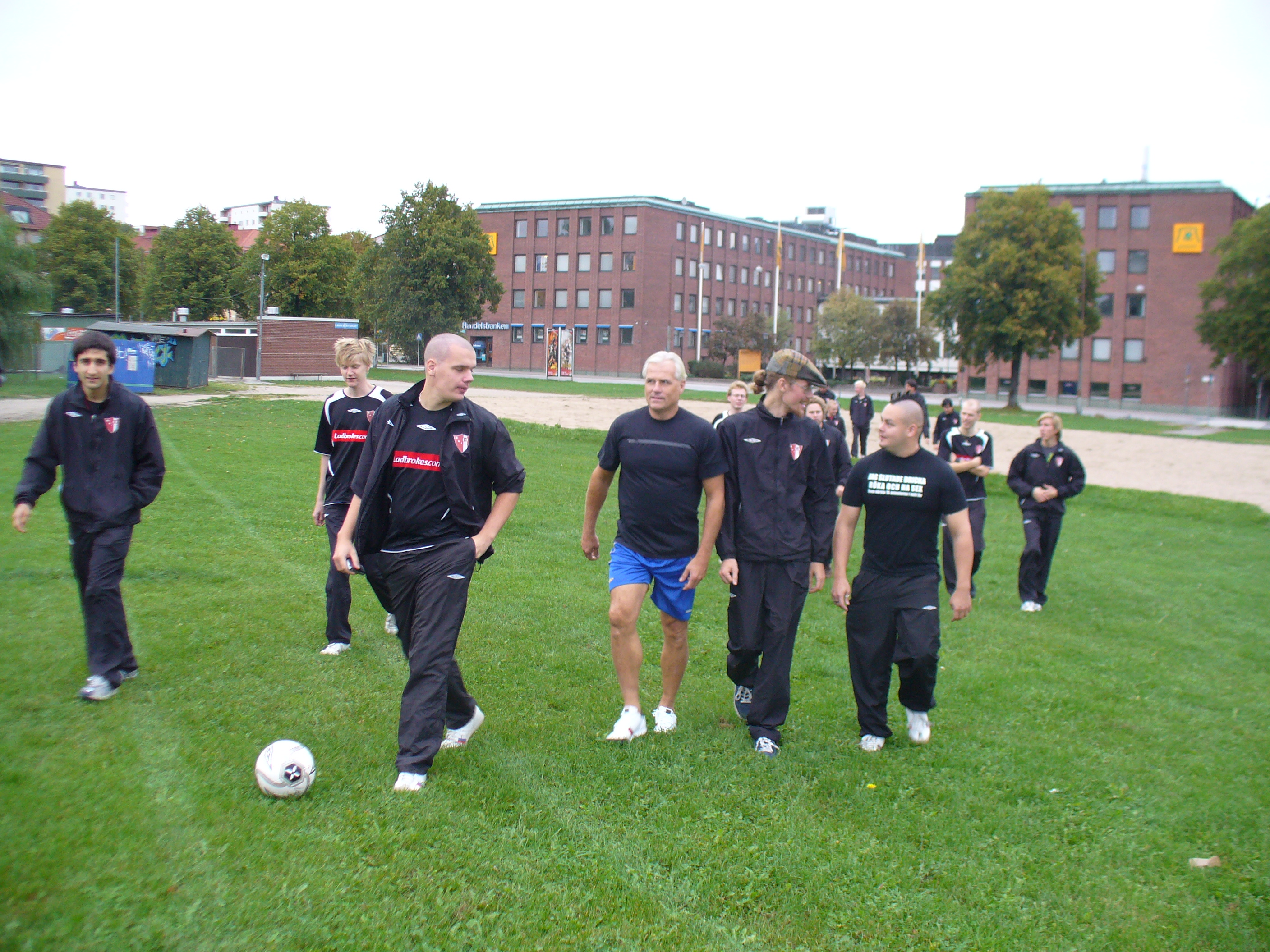
Glenn Hysén on reality TV show FC Z

Hysén has been assistant coach for Torslanda IK. This experience landed him a spot on reality show FC Z which takes 15 men between the ages of 18 and 31 who have never played football before and trains them so they can play against a real team. On the show, he is the coach of the football team FC Zulu which was pinned against his son Tobias's former team, Djurgårdens IF.

In November 2010, Glenn Hysén signed a contract making him co-head coach of Swedish division II team Utsiktens BK.

== Personal life ==
Hysén and his first wife Kerstin had two children. On 9 March 1982 Tobias was born and three years later daughter Charlotte arrived. Kerstin and Glenn divorced.

He married his second wife Helena and had three children. The first of which was son Alexander, who was born on 12 May 1987. That same year, the family moved to Italy, while Hysén was playing for Fiorentina. Whilst Hysén was playing for Fiorentina, a man proposed to Helena and Hysén chased after him and threw him up against a wall, which he revealed in his biography. Hysén and Helena had son Anton, who was born in 1990, and a daughter, Annie, born in 1994.

=== Television ===
After Hysén's retirement from football, he has worked as an expert commentator for TV6 and TV3 in Sweden. At the end of each transmission, he appoints three football players for the game's best player. He now works as a commentator for TV2 in Norway.

Hysén competed as a celebrity dancer in Let's Dance 2014 being the third to be eliminated.

Since 2014 Hysén is also an ambassador for the gaming company Unibet, and the cleaning company Sweden & Co.

=== Incident at Frankfurt Airport ===
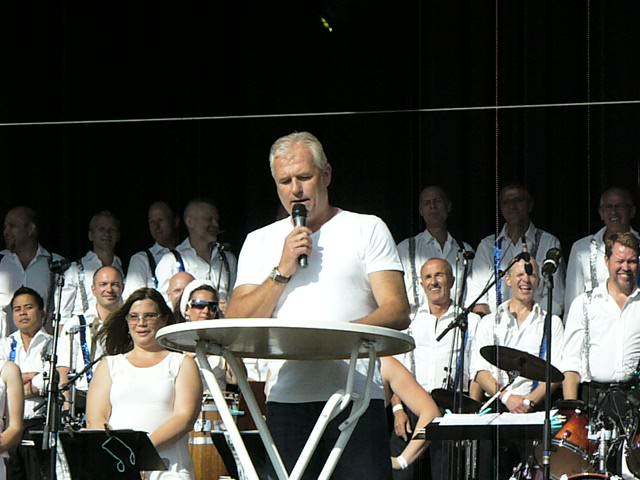
Glenn Hysén giving a speech at Stockholm Pride 2007

At Frankfurt Airport in 2001, Hysén attacked a man who had groped him while in the public restroom. In 2007, Hysén spoke at Stockholm Pride, the largest gay pride festival in the Nordic region. Many people from the gay community were surprised due to the earlier incident. At the Stockholm Pride, he delivered a speech denouncing sports homophobia and laid to rest his 2001 airport incident.

He said, "I know that many LGBT people have been the victims of assaults and hate crimes. I can therefore understand if some people have been upset by the airport incident, so I want to be clear: I think that it is completely unacceptable that anybody should be subjected to assaults, insults or hate crimes due to their sexual orientation or gender identity,...The incident had been blown out of proportion in the media...In order to finally flush the Frankfurt Airport punch down the toilet: it is not the case that I beat up a gay person. I categorically deny that. ...I'm not proud that I took a swing at him, but I am proud that I have integrity and that I reacted."

In the same speech he asked "How easy would it be for a sixteen-year-old boy who plays football to come out as gay to his team mates?" In March 2011 his youngest son, Anton, a professional footballer himself, came out of the closet to the media.

== Career statistics ==
=== International ===
Appearances and goals by national team and year
National team	Year	Apps	Goals
Sweden	1981	7	1
Sweden	1982	4	0
Sweden	1983	9	3
Sweden	1984	7	0
Sweden	1985	6	0
Sweden	1986	8	1
Sweden	1987	6	1
Sweden	1988	8	1
Sweden	1989	6	0
Sweden	1990	7	0
Total		68	7

Scores and results list Sweden's goal tally first, score column indicates score after each Hysén goal.

List of international goals scored by Glenn Hysén
No.	Date	Venue	Opponent	Score	Result	Competition	Ref.
1	24 June 1981	Råsunda Stadium, Solna, Sweden	Portugal	2–0	3–0	1982 FIFA World Cup qualifier	
2	15 May 1983	Malmö Stadion, Malmö, Sweden	Cyprus	3–0	5–0	UEFA Euro 1984 qualifier	
3	22 June 1983	Ullevi, Gothenburg, Sweden	Brazil	3–2	3–3	Friendly	
4	17 August 1983	Laugardalsvöllur, Reykjavík, Iceland	Iceland	3–0	4–0	Friendly	
5	16 November 1986	National Stadium, Ta' Qali, Malta	Malta	1–0	5–0	UEFA Euro 1988 qualifier	
6	14 October 1987	Parkstadion, Gelsenkirchen, Germany	West Germany	1–1	1–1	Friendly	
7	1 June 1988	El Helmantico, Villares de la Reina, Spain	Spain	1–0	1–0	Friendly	

== Honours ==
IFK Göteborg

- UEFA Cup: 1981–82, 1986–87
- Swedish Champion: 1982, 1983, 1987
- Svenska Cupen: 1978–79, 1981–82, 1982–83

Liverpool

- Football League First Division: 1989–90
- FA Charity Shield: 1989, 1990 (shared)

Individual

- Guldbollen: 1983, 1988
- Stor Grabb: 1983
- Årets ärkeängel: 1981
- Guerin Sportivo All-Star Team: 1983
- World XI: 1987
