= Erik Hysén =

Swedish association football player

Personal information
- Full name: Erik Valter Hysén
- Date of birth: 18 May 1906
- Place of birth: Härryda, Sweden
- Date of death: 25 April 1988 (aged 81)
- Position: Midfielder

Youth career
- Krokslätts IK
- Fässbergs IF

Senior career*
Years	Team	Apps	(Gls)
1926–1938	IFK Göteborg	121	(24)
- * Club domestic league appearances and goals

Erik Valter Hysén (18 May 1906 – 25 April 1988) was a Swedish footballer who played as a midfielder. He played for IFK Göteborg between 1926 and 1938.

== Personal life ==
Hysén was the brother of Carl Hysén, the grandfather of Glenn Hysén, and the great-grandfather of Tobias Hysén, Alexander Hysén, and Antonio Hysén.

== Honours ==
IFK Göteborg

- Allsvenskan: 1934–35
