= Mikael Källström =

Swedish footballer and coach

Personal information
- Full name: Jan Mikael Källström
- Date of birth: 26 February 1959 (age 67)
- Position: Attacking midfielder

Youth career
- IFK Hedemora

Senior career*
Years	Team	Apps	(Gls)
1977–1983	Sandvikens IF		
1984–1989	Gefle IF	145	(37)
1990–1994	BK Häcken		
1995	Jonsereds IF	11	(3)

International career
1976–1977	Sweden U19	11	(0)

Managerial career
- 2011: Sandefjord Fotball
- * Club domestic league appearances and goals

Jan Mikael Källström (born 26 February 1959) is a Swedish football coach and former footballer. He made 57 Allsvenskan appearances for Gefle IF and BK Häcken and scored eight goals.

Källström is the father of Swedish international footballer Kim Källström and the brother of Swedish footballer Jonas Källström. He appeared for the Sweden U19 team a total of 11 times.

In 2011, he became acting manager in Sandefjord Fotball
