= Gustav Sandberg Magnusson =

Swedish footballer

Personal information
- Full name: Lars Gustav Sandberg Magnusson
- Date of birth: 3 February 1992 (age 34)
- Place of birth: Stockholm, Sweden
- Height: 1.81 m (5 ft 11 in)
- Position: Midfielder

Team information
- Current team: IF Brommapojkarna
- Number: 6

Youth career
- 1998–2009: IF Brommapojkarna

Senior career*
Years	Team	Apps	(Gls)
2009–2024	IF Brommapojkarna	295	(34)
2010	→ Gröndals IK (loan)	4	(0)
2011	→ Valsta Syrianska IK (loan)	7	(0)

International career
2011	Sweden U19	2	(0)
- * Club domestic league appearances and goals as of 15 November 2023

Gustav Sandberg Magnusson (born 3 February 1992) is a Swedish footballer who plays for IF Brommapojkarna as a midfielder.
