= Häljarps IF =

Swedish football club

- Full name: Häljarps Idrottsförening
- Founded: 1930
- Ground: Häljarps IP; Häljarp; Sweden
- League: Division 4 Skåne Nordvästra
| Home colours | Away colours |

Häljarps IF is a Swedish football club located in Häljarp.

== Background ==
Häljarps IF currently plays in Division 4 Skåne Nordvästra which is the sixth tier of Swedish football. They play their home matches at the Häljarps IP in Häljarp.

The club is affiliated to Skånes Fotbollförbund.

== Season to season ==
In their most successful period Häljarps IF competed in the following divisions:

| Season | Level | Division | Section | Position | Movements |
|---|---|---|---|---|---|
| 1979 | Tier 4 | Division 4 | Skåne Sydvästra | 9th | |
| 1980 | Tier 4 | Division 4 | Skåne Sydvästra | 4th | |
| 1981 | Tier 4 | Division 4 | Skåne Sydvästra | 12th | Relegated |

In recent seasons Häljarps IF have competed in the following divisions:

| Season | Level | Division | Section | Position | Movements |
|---|---|---|---|---|---|
| 2006* | Tier 7 | Division 5 | Skåne Västra | 3rd | Promotion Playoffs |
| 2007 | Tier 7 | Division 5 | Skåne Västra | 3rd | Promotion Playoffs – Promoted |
| 2008 | Tier 6 | Division 4 | Skåne Västra | 6th | |
| 2009 | Tier 6 | Division 4 | Skåne Västra | 6th | |
| 2010 | Tier 6 | Division 4 | Skåne Nordvästra | 9th | Relegation Playoffs |
| 2011 | Tier 6 | Division 4 | Skåne Nordvästra | 10th | Relegation Playoffs |

* League restructuring in 2006 resulted in a new division being created at Tier 3 and subsequent divisions dropping a level.
