= Mala, Sweden =

Mala
- Location within Skåne Location within Sweden
- Coordinates: 56°14′N 13°42′E
- Country: Sweden
- Province: Skåne
- County: Skåne County
- Municipality: Hässleholm Municipality

Area
  - Total: 0.810 km^{2} (0.313 sq mi)

Population (31 December 2019)
  - Total: 223
  - Density: 275.3/km^{2} (713/sq mi)
- Time zone: UTC+1 (CET)
  - Summer (DST): UTC+2 (CEST)

Mala is a locality situated in Hässleholm Municipality, Skåne County, Sweden with 223 inhabitants.
