= Häljarp =

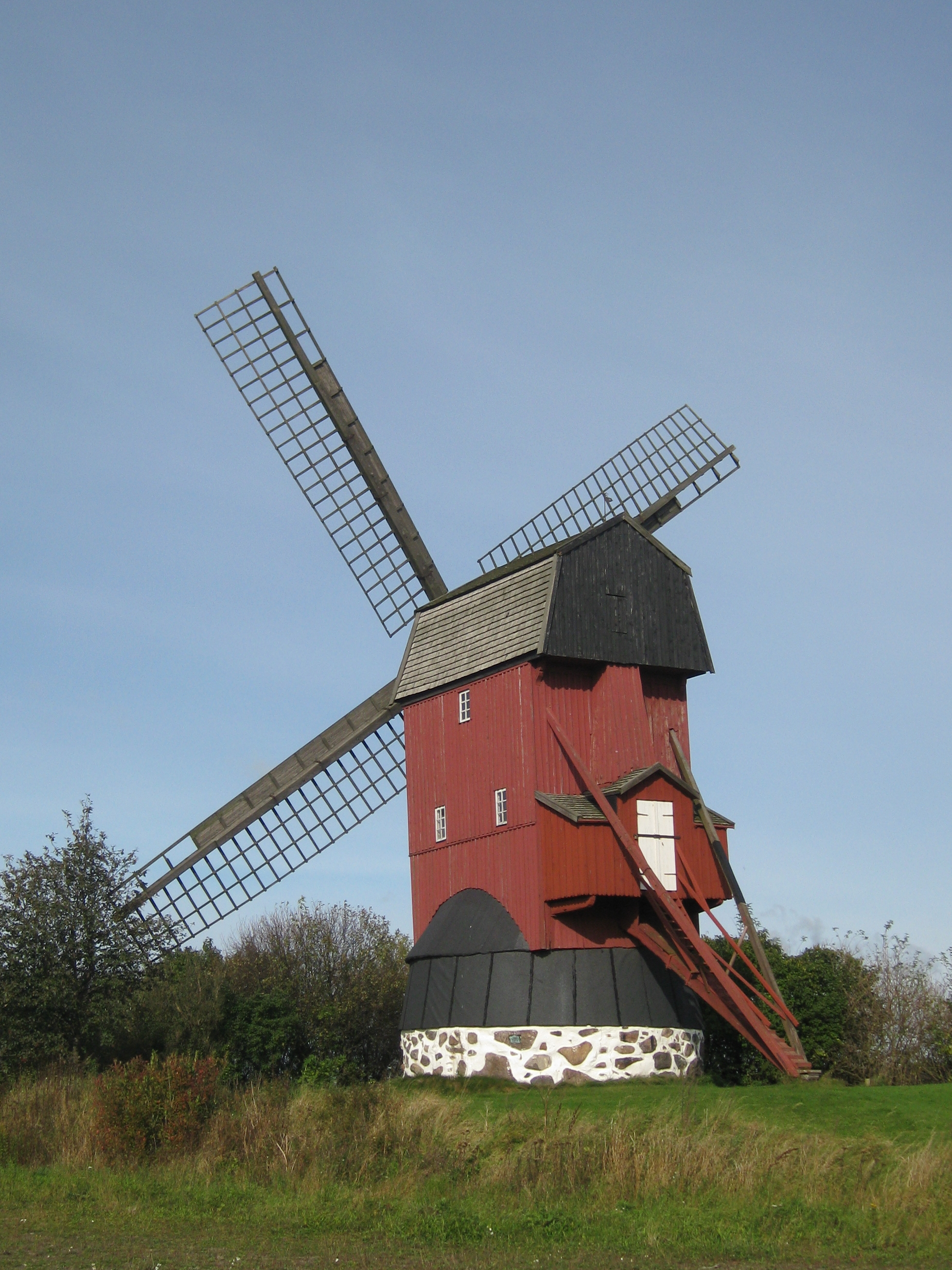
- Windmill in Häljarp

- Location within Skåne Location within Sweden
- Coordinates: 55°51′N 12°55′E
- Country: Sweden
- Province: Skåne
- County: Skåne County
- Municipality: Landskrona Municipality

Area
  - Total: 1.58 km^{2} (0.61 sq mi)

Population (31 December 2010)
  - Total: 2,795
  - Density: 1,766/km^{2} (4,570/sq mi)
- Time zone: UTC+1 (CET)
  - Summer (DST): UTC+2 (CEST)

Häljarp is a locality situated in Landskrona Municipality, Skåne County, Sweden with 2,795 inhabitants in 2010. Häljarp has several schools, a supermarket, two pizzerias and a train station connected to West Coast Line (Sweden). Häljarp has trains going to Malmö, Lund, Helsingborg and several smaller towns and villages.

== Sports ==
The following sports clubs are located in Häljarp:

- Häljarps IF
- Häljarps SK
