= Alexander Hysén =

Swedish footballer

Personal information
- Full name: Glenn Alexander Hysén
- Date of birth: 12 May 1987 (age 39)
- Place of birth: Sweden
- Height: 1.93 m (6 ft 4 in)
- Position: Goalkeeper

Youth career
- Torslanda IK

Senior career*
Years	Team	Apps	(Gls)
2006–2009	BK Häcken	32	(0)
2009	GIF Sundsvall	6	(0)
2010	Östersunds FK	22	(0)
Total		60	(0)

International career^{‡}
2007	Sweden U21	2	(0)
- * Club domestic league appearances and goals as of -- ‡ National team caps and goals as of --

Glenn Alexander Norberg-Hysén (born 12 May 1987) is a Swedish former footballer who played as a goalkeeper.

== Early years ==
He was born to parents Glenn Hysén of Liverpool F.C. fame and his second wife Helena. Alexander has two younger siblings named Anton and Annie as well as two older siblings from his fathers first marriage named Tobias and Charlotte. He is the great-grandson of Erik Hysén.

== Club career ==
Like his brothers, Alexander started his youth career at Torslanda IK. He made his debut for Häcken in 2006 where he continued to play for the next three years. In 2008, Alexander was the second goalie and got very little playing time. In 2009, he moved to Superettan side GIF Sundsvall. In April 2010 he was sent on loan to Östersunds FK in the third tier of the Swedish League system.

== International career ==
In 2007, he was capped twice for the Sweden national under-21 team.
