= Matteo Blomqvist-Zampi =

Italian-born Swedish footballer

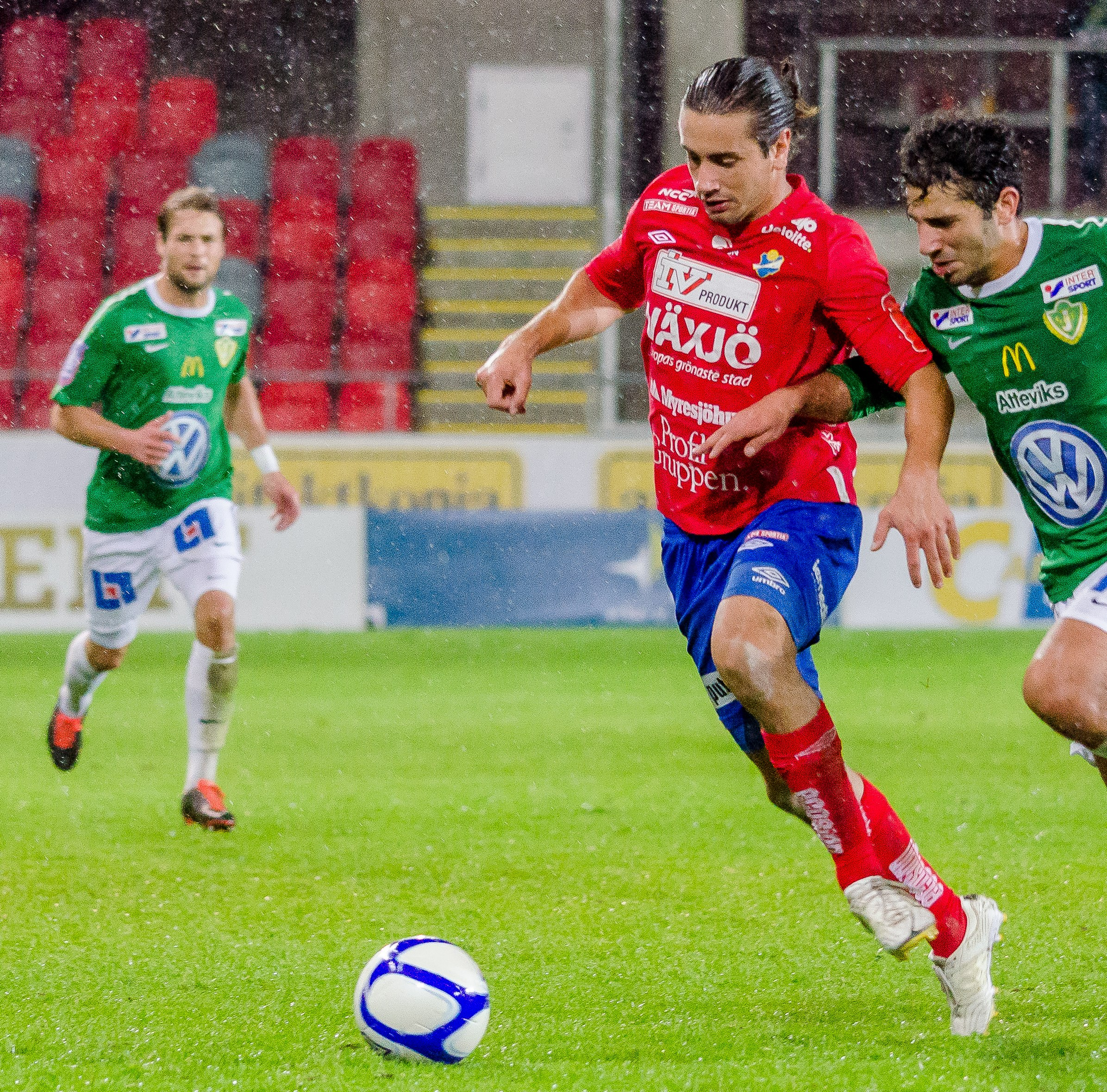
- Blomqvist-Zampi in 2012

Personal information
- Date of birth: 15 August 1990 (age 36)
- Height: 1.81 m (5 ft 11 in)
- Position: Forward

Youth career
- –2007: Växjö BK

Senior career*
Years	Team	Apps	(Gls)
2008–2013	Östers IF		
2013–2015	Falkenbergs FF	6	(1)
2015–2016	Östers IF		
- * Club domestic league appearances and goals

Matteo Blomqvist-Zampi (born 15 August 1990) is a Swedish former professional footballer who played as a forward. (Note: Matteo Blomqvist-Zampi at WorldFootball.net)
