= Per-Olof Bild =

Swedish footballer (born 1949)

Personal information
- Full name: Per-Olof Bild
- Date of birth: 13 December 1949 (age 76)
- Place of birth: Sweden
- Position: Defender

Senior career*
Years	Team	Apps	(Gls)
1968–1984	Östers IF	329	(24)
1984	Högadals IS	15	(0)

International career
1980	Sweden	2	(0)
- * Club domestic league appearances and goals

Per-Olof Bild (born 13 December 1949) is a Swedish former football player.

During his club career, Bild played for Östers IF and Högadals IS.

Bild made two appearances for the Sweden men's national football team, both coming in 1980.
