= Torslanda IK =

Swedish football club

- Full name: Torslanda Idrottsklubb
- Founded: 1944
- Ground: Torslandavallen; Torslanda; Sweden
- Capacity: 1,500
- Coach: Declan Edge
- League: Division 2 Västra Götaland
- 2024: Ettan Södra, 10th
Home colours	Away colours

Torslanda IK is a local sports club in Torslanda, Gothenburg, Sweden.

== History ==
Torslanda IK was founded in 1944 by Anders Tullock, Bengt Tullock and Erik Danielsson. In the 1950s the sports club created sections for football, table tennis, handball, and hockey. In the 1960s gymnastics and in 1972 bowling were added.

The men's A football team won Division VI titles in 1981 and 1985. The men's A team advanced to Division IV in 1987, winning that title in 1996.

The club's original clubhouse was built in 1979 at Torslandavallen but was destroyed by fire in 1992. A replacement clubhouse was inaugurated in March 1994.

Torslanda IK are affiliated to the Göteborgs Fotbollförbund.

== Season to season ==
Season	Level	Division	Section	Position	Movements
1997	Tier 4	Division 3	Nordvästra Götaland	1st	Promoted
1998	Tier 3	Division 2	Västra Götaland	3rd	
1999	Tier 3	Division 2	Västra Götaland	2nd	
2000	Tier 3	Division 2	Västra Götaland	1st	Promotion Playoffs
2001	Tier 3	Division 2	Västra Götaland	7th	
2002	Tier 3	Division 2	Västra Götaland	7th	
2003	Tier 3	Division 2	Västra Götaland	4th	
2004	Tier 3	Division 2	Västra Götaland	3rd	
2005	Tier 3	Division 2	Västra Götaland	5th	Promotion Playoffs
2006*	Tier 4	Division 2	Västra Götaland	1st	Promoted
2007	Tier 3	Division 1	Södra	11th	
2008	Tier 3	Division 1	Södra	10th	
2009	Tier 3	Division 1	Södra	11th	
2010	Tier 3	Division 1	Södra	13th	Relegated
2011	Tier 4	Division 2	Västra Götaland	3rd	
2012	Tier 4	Division 2	Västra Götaland	1st	Promoted
2013	Tier 3	Division 1	Södra	12th	Relegated

* League restructuring in 2006 resulted in a new division being created at Tier 3 and subsequent divisions dropping a level.

== Current squad ==
As of 1 September 2025

Note: Flags indicate national team as defined under FIFA eligibility rules; some limited exceptions apply. Players may hold more than one non-FIFA nationality.

No.	Pos.	Nation	Player
1	GK	SWE	Erik Krantz
2	DF	SWE	Fabian Påhlman
3	DF	SWE	Ludvig Holgersson
4	MF	NZL	Harry Edge
5	DF	SWE	Allan Andersson
6	DF	NZL	Dominic Wooldridge
7	FW	SWE	Yonatan Yosef
8	MF	SWE	Ludvig Eknander
9	FW	SWE	Liam Björninger
11	MF	SWE	Elliot Bäcklund
12	MF	SWE	Malte Nydén
13	DF	SWE	Felix Wennergrund
14	DF	SWE	Charlie Axede (on loan from BK Häcken)

No.	Pos.	Nation	Player
16	MF	NZL	Sean Bright
17	MF	SWE	Albin Bergström
18	FW	SWE	Hannes Davidsson
19	DF	SWE	Elliot Blessner
21	FW	SWE	Olle Johansson
22	MF	SWE	Filip Landegren
23	MF	SWE	Edvard Jahn
24	FW	CAN	Lyvann Baltimore
25	MF	SWE	Kasper Davidsson
26	FW	SWE	Leon Dusi
31	GK	SWE	Joel Nöller
32	GK	SWE	Lukas Lehto
—	DF	SWE	Max Hjalmarsson
