= Jimmie Augustsson =

Swedish footballer

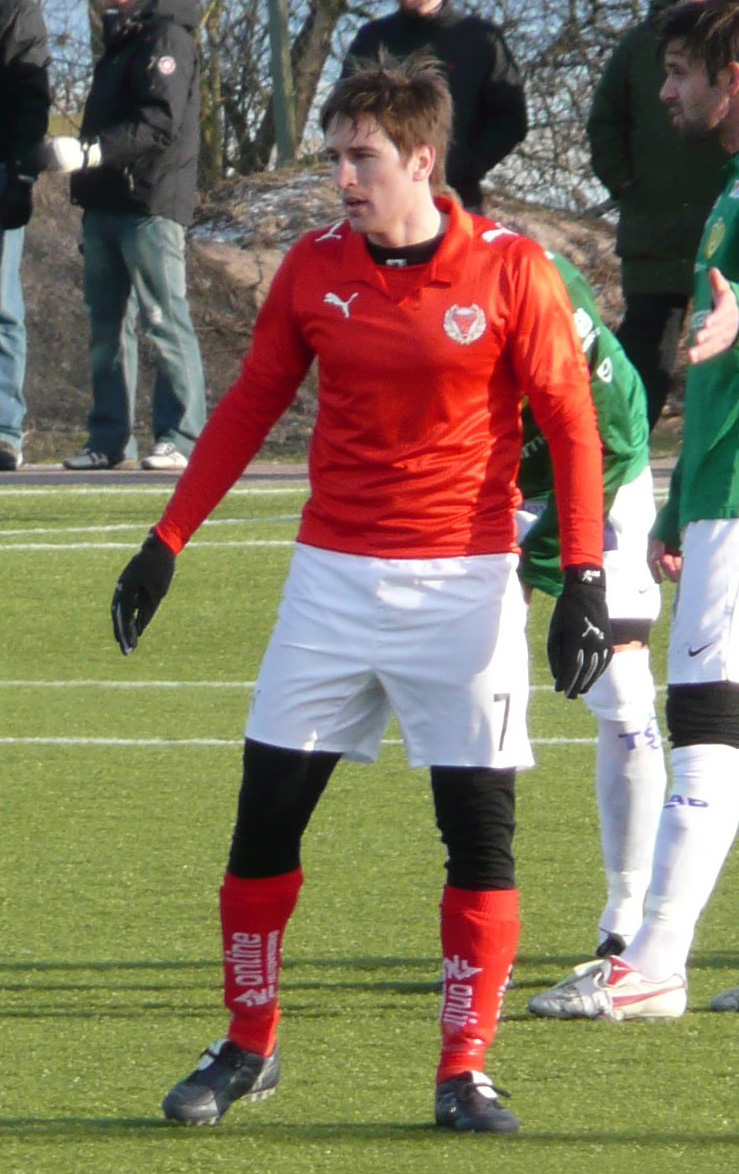

Personal information
- Full name: Göran Sjunne Jimmie Augustsson
- Date of birth: 13 April 1981 (age 45)
- Place of birth: Tyringe, Hässleholm, Sweden
- Position: Midfielder

Senior career*
| Years | Team | Apps | (Gls) |
| 1999 | Tyringe IF | | |
| 2000–2004 | IFK Hässleholm | 87 | (24) |
| 2005–2007 | Trelleborgs FF | 65 | (7) |
| 2008–2011 | Kalmar FF | 19 | (1) |
| 2011–2012 | Assyriska FF | 54 | (1) |
- * Club domestic league appearances and goals ‡ National team caps and goals as of 10 April 2013

Jimmie Augustsson (born 13 April 1981 in Tyringe, Hässleholm) is a Swedish footballer.
