= Jakob Augustsson =

Swedish footballer

Personal information
- Full name: Jakob Augustsson
- Date of birth: 8 October 1980 (age 45)
- Place of birth: Häljarp, Sweden
- Height: 1.83 m (6 ft 0 in)
- Position: Defender

Youth career
- Landskrona BoIS

Senior career*
Years	Team	Apps	(Gls)
1998–2000	Landskrona BoIS	55	(1)
2001–2003	FC Lyn Oslo	50	(1)
2004–2006	Helsingborgs IF	42	(0)
2005	→ Sandefjord Fotball (loan)	7	(0)
2007–2014	Ängelholms FF	175	(8)
2015–2016	Höganäs BK	4	(0)

International career
1999	Sweden U19	9	(1)
2000	Sweden U21	5	(0)

Managerial career
- 2015–2016: Höganäs BK
- * Club domestic league appearances and goals as of 31 December 2018

Jakob Augustsson (born 8 October 1980 in Häljarp, Sweden), is a former football defender who last played for Ängelholms FF. Prior to signing for the club, he represented Helsingborgs IF. He has also played for FC Lyn Oslo in Norway and Landskrona BoIS.
