= Antonio Hysén =

Swedish footballer

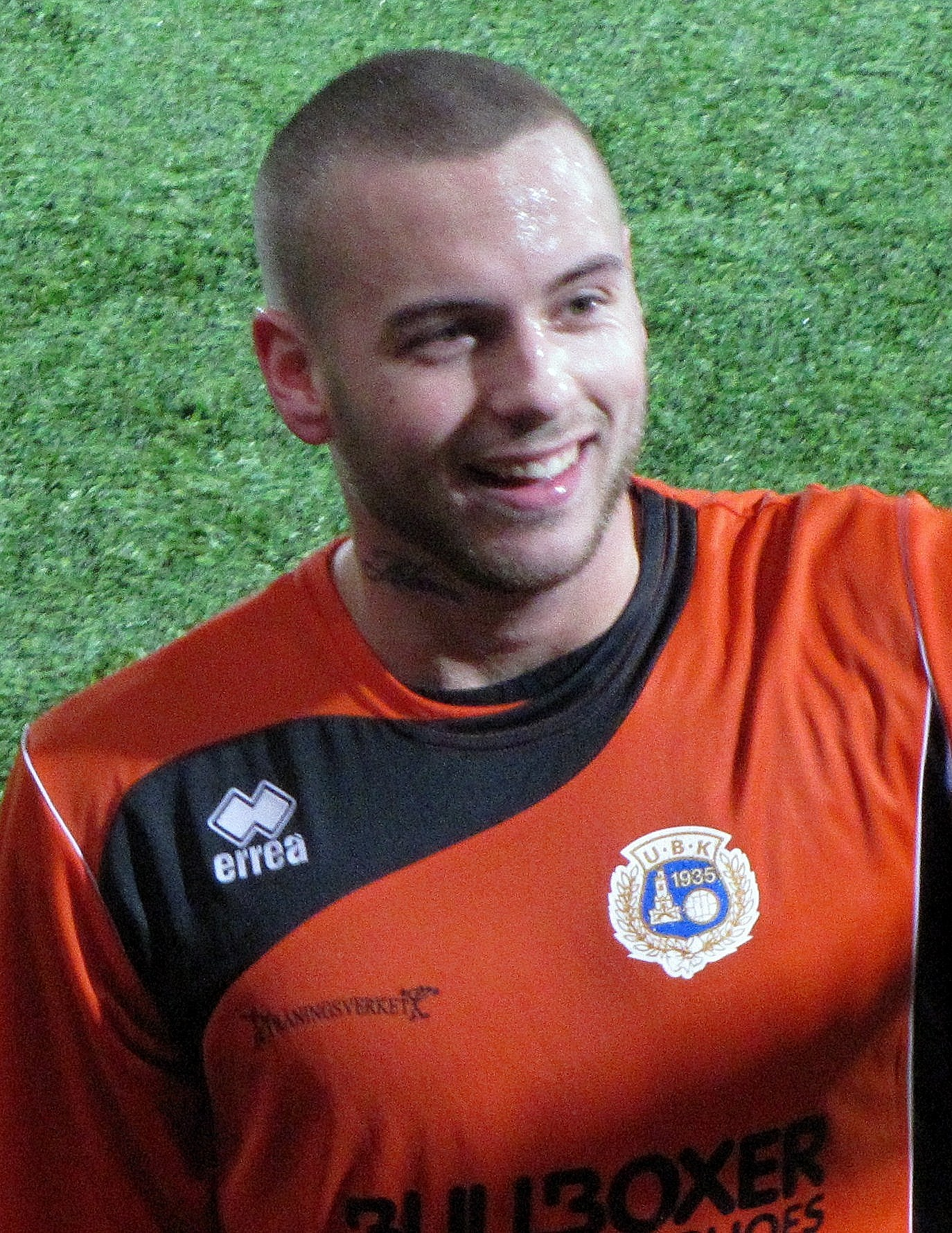
- Hysén at Utsiktens BK in 2012

Personal information
- Full name: Antonio Hysén
- Date of birth: 13 December 1990 (age 35)
- Place of birth: Liverpool, England
- Position: Defender

Team information
- Current team: Torslanda IK
- Number: 20

Youth career
- 1999–2000: Torslanda IK
- 2001–2003: Lundby IF
- 2004–2007: BK Häcken

College career
Years	Team	Apps	(Gls)
2010	North Carolina Wesleyan College	0	(0)

Senior career*
Years	Team	Apps	(Gls)
2008–2009	BK Häcken	0	(0)
2010–2013	Utsiktens BK	71	(2)
2014	Myrtle Beach FC	0	(0)
2015	Torslanda IK	12	(2)
- * Club domestic league appearances and goals

Antonio Hysén (born Glenn Anton Hysén 13 December 1990) is a Swedish footballer who plays as a defender.

== Football career ==
He was given a trainee contract with BK Häcken from 2007 to 2009, but was hindered by injuries and instead joined Utsiktens BK in 2010 after spending the spring of 2010 at North Carolina Wesleyan College in Rocky Mount, North Carolina. In 2014, he played with the American fourth division team Myrtle Beach FC. In 2015, he signed with Torslanda IK.

== Personal life ==
Hysén is the son of former Swedish international Glenn Hysén, and was born in Liverpool, when his father was playing for Liverpool F.C. Antonio Hysén came out as gay to the Swedish football magazine Offside in March 2011. He became only the second active footballer to come out as gay. The BBC called him "a global one-off".

Hysén was profiled on Swedish broadcaster TV4 on 9 March 2011, in a debate show moderated by Lennart Ekdal titled Får även bögar spela fotboll? ("Can gays play football too?").

His older brothers are football players Tobias Hysén (half-brother) and Alexander Hysén. He won the seventh season of Let's Dance, being the first openly gay person to win this competition. He is the great-grandson of the footballer Erik Hysén.
