= Jörgen Augustsson =

Swedish footballer (born 1952)

Personal information
- Date of birth: 28 October 1952 (age 74)
- Place of birth: Mala, Sweden
- Position: Defender

Senior career*
Years	Team	Apps	(Gls)
- Åtvidabergs FF
- Landskrona BoIS

International career
1974–1977	Sweden	18	(0)

Managerial career
- 1990: IFK Norrköping
- 1996: Jönköpings Södra IF
- 2000: Åtvidabergs FF
- * Club domestic league appearances and goals

Jörgen Augustsson (born 28 October 1952) is a Swedish former footballer who played as a defender.

Augustsson played for Åtvidabergs FF and Landskrona BoIS in Allsvenskan during his career. He was also capped 18 times for the Sweden national team and was a member of the squad in the 1974 FIFA World Cup.

He coached IFK Norrköping and Jönköpings Södra IF in 1996.

He was also the coach of Fyllingen from Bergen in Norway early in the 1990s.
