= Harry Bild =

Swedish footballer (1936–2025)

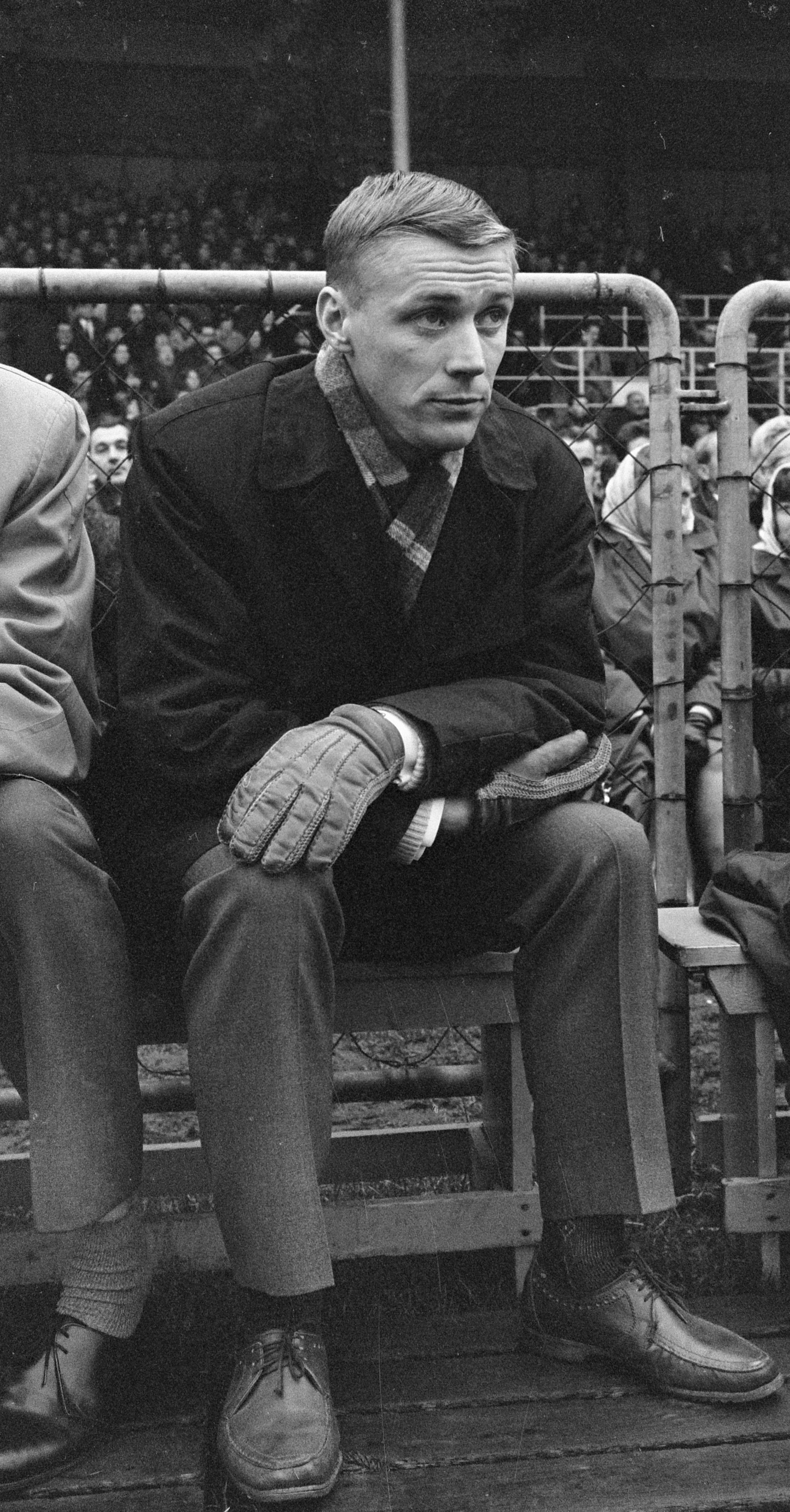
- Bild in 1965

Personal information
- Full name: Harry Sven-Olof Bild
- Date of birth: 18 December 1936
- Place of birth: Växjö, Sweden
- Date of death: 16 January 2025 (aged 88)
- Place of death: Växjö, Sweden
- Position: Striker

Senior career*
Years	Team	Apps	(Gls)
1956–1964	IFK Norrköping	175	(120)
1964–1965	FC Zürich	17	(6)
1965–1967	Feyenoord	52	(39)
1968–1973	Östers IF	115	(42)
Total		359	(207)

International career
1957–1968	Sweden	28	(13)
- * Club domestic league appearances and goals

Harry Sven-Olof Bild (18 December 1936 – 16 January 2025) was a Swedish professional footballer who played as a striker. Starting off his career with IFK Norrköping in 1956, he went on to represent FC Zürich and Feyenoord before retiring at Östers IF in 1973. A full international between 1957 and 1968, he won 28 caps and scored 13 goals for the Sweden national team. In 1963, he was awarded Guldbollen as Sweden's best footballer of the year.

== Club career ==
Born in Växjö he was transferred to IFK Norrköping during the 1950s. He turned professional for FC Zürich in Switzerland and for Feyenoord in the Netherlands, scoring 39 goals in 52 games. He returned to his homeland to join Östers IF in 1967 and won the Swedish national title in 1968. Between 1968 and 1973, he scored 42 goals in 113 matches for Östers.

== International career ==
Bild made 28 appearances and scored 13 goals for the Sweden national football team and he won Guldbollen in 1963.

== Death ==
Bild died from cancer on 16 January 2025, at the age of 88.

== Honours ==
Individual

- Stor Grabb: 1962
- Guldbollen: 1963
