= Vem? =

Studio album by Grönwalls
- Released: 18 January 1999
- Genre: dansband music
- Length: circa 50 minutes
- Label: Frituna

Grönwalls chronology
Bara vi och månen (1997)	Vem? (1999)	Visa vad du går för (2000)

Vem? is a 1999 studio album by Swedish dansband Grönwalls.

== Track listing ==
1. Vem?
2. Stoppa klockan
3. I varje andetag
4. Hooked on a Feeling
5. Min tanke är hos dig
6. Glöm ej ta mig med
7. Anna och mej (Me and Bobby McGee)
8. Be mig stanna kvar
9. Nånstans i det blå
10. Min kärlek är du
11. Ju mer jag ser dig
12. En natt med dig
13. Ett tomt och öde hus
14. Då kan jag lova dig kärlek
15. Never Again, Again

== Charts ==
Chart (1999)	Peak position
Sweden (Sverigetopplistan)	17
