= Monia (album) =

Studio album by Monia Sjöström
- Released: December 2000
- Recorded: The Sound Kitchen, Franklin, Tennessee, United States
- Genre: country
- Length: circa 53 minutes
- Label: Frituna

Monia Sjöström chronology
Monia (2000)	Söderns hjärtas ros (2003)

Monia is a studio album by Monia Sjöström. It was released in 2000. Monia was Sjöström's debut studio album as a solo artist after spending the 1990s in Grönwalls.

== Track listing ==
1. I Should Be Sleeping (Lisa Drew, Shaye Smith)
2. I'm not so Tough (Bruce Bouton, Robert Ellis Orrall, Hillary Lindsay)
3. With This Kiss (Amy Sky, Anthony Vanderburgh)
4. Dance (Franne Golde, Marsha Malamet, Holly Lamar)
5. I Can Do Anything (Franne Golde, Marsha Malamet, Robin Lerner)
6. Almost Mine (Victoria Shaw, Cliff Downs, David Pack)
7. I Remember This (Charlie Black, Carolyn Dawn Johnson, Steven Mandile)
8. Walk on Water (Amy Grant, Wayne Kirkpatrick))
9. I'm all over that (Dave Pickell, Ron Irving, Linda McKillip)
10. The Room (Christ Waters, Tom Shapiro)
11. You Don't Know How it Feels (Wayne Kirkpatrick, Jamie Houston)
12. My Heart Can't Tell You No (Simon Climie, Dennis Morgan)

== Contributing musicians ==
1. Mike Severs – guitar
2. Doug Kahan – bass
3. John Hammond – drums
4. Michael Rojas – keyboard
5. Michael Johnson – steel guitar

== Charts ==
Chart (2001)	Peak position
Sweden (Sverigetopplistan)	25
