= Hästveda railway station =

Railway station in Hästveda, Sweden

Coordinates: 56.2874°N 13.9345°E

Hästveda
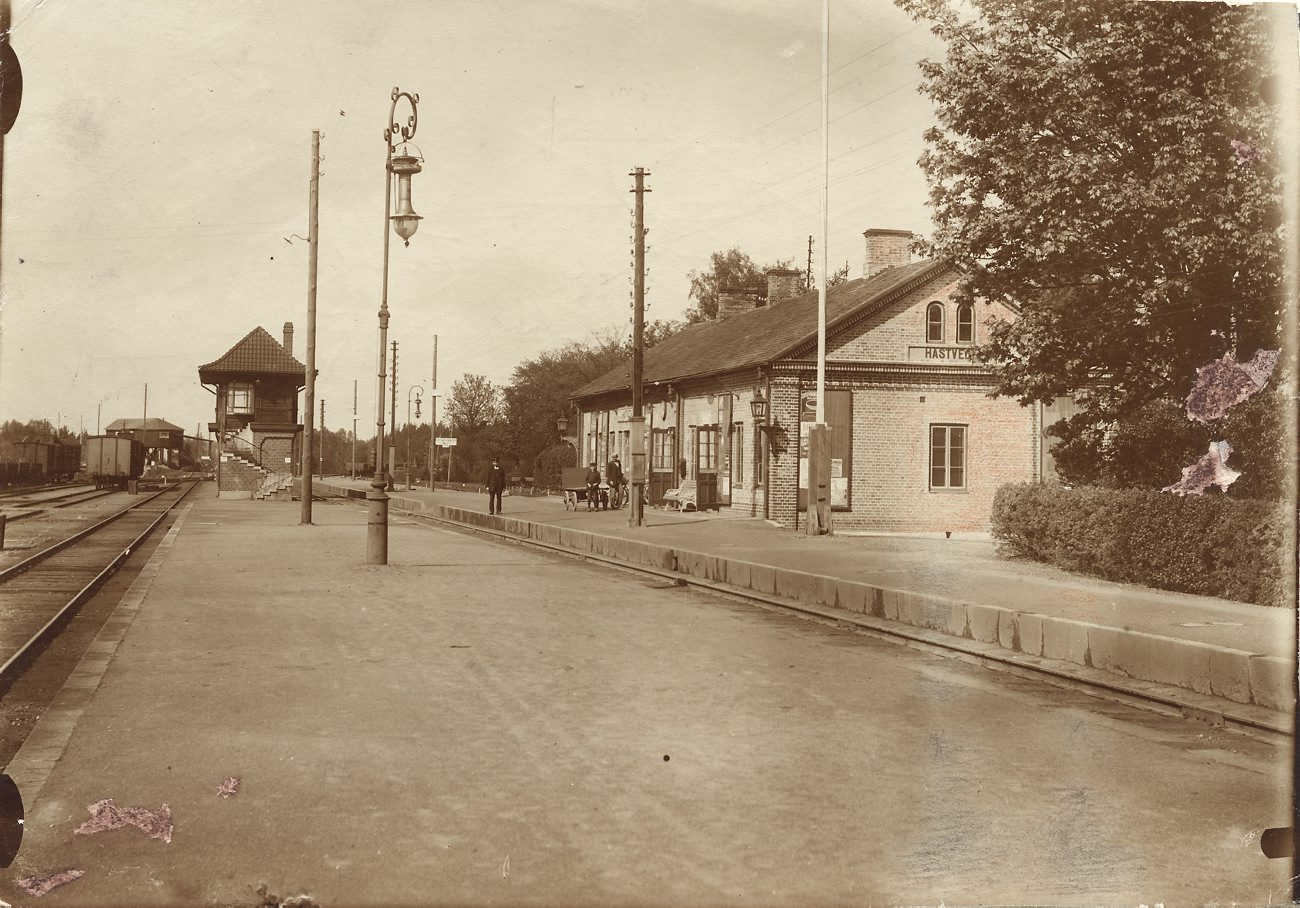
- Early view of the station, date unknown.

General information
- Location: Hästveda, Hässleholm; Sweden
- Line: Southern Main Line
- Platforms: 2
- Tracks: 3

Construction
- Accessible: Yes

Passengers
- 310 per weekday (2016)

Services
Preceding station	Pågatågen	Following station
Ballingslöv towards Hässleholm	Line 10 Krösatågen	Osby towards Växjö
Location

The Hästveda railway station is located on Östra Järnvägsgatan in the locality of Hästveda, in Hässleholm Municipality, Skåne County, Sweden.

The station opened with the arrival of the railway in the 1860s. No trains stopped at the station between 1975 and 2013.

As part of a plan to increase local passenger traffic in southern Sweden, the station was rebuilt and refurbished between 2011 and 2013. It was re-inaugurated on December 14, 2013, with regular passenger traffic starting on the following day. As of 2020, the station is served by the Växjö–Hässleholm route of the Krösatågen regional rail network. In Skåne, where Hästveda is located, ticket-wise the trains belong to Pågatågen.
