= Du har det där =

Studio album by Grönwalls
- Released: 29 October 1992
- Genre: Dansband Music
- Length: 49 minutes
- Label: Frituna

Grönwalls chronology
Du har det där (1992)	Högt i det blå (1993)

Du har det där is the debut studio album by Swedish dansband Grönwalls. It was released on 29 October 1992. Being the band's debut album, it was nominated for a Grammis Award. The songs "Du har det där" and "Du ringde från Flen" also became Svensktoppen hit songs.

== Track listing ==
1. Du har det där (Bert Månsson)
2. Ett ärligt svar (Jack Johansen-Eva Andersson)
3. Limon Limonero (Carlos Imperial-Stig Olin)
4. Hand i hand med kärleken (Bert Månsson)
5. Achy Breaky Heart (Donald Von Tress)
6. I motvind (Michael Saxell)
7. Intill mig (Real World) (Lothar Krell-Maggie Reilly-Gavin Hodgson-Stewart McKillop-Michael Persson)
8. Du, jag och kärleken (Mats Andersson)
9. Kär i dig (Touch the Sky) (Carl-Axel Gårdebäck-Gunnar Johansson-Lars Sandberg)
10. Du ringde från Flen (Ulf Nordqvist)
11. Jag skall bygga en bro (Michael Saxell)
12. Hela natten lång (Hele natten lang) (Anders Valbro-Monia Sjöström-Mikael Andersen)
13. Om en stund (Calle Kindbom-Per-Ola Pettersson)
14. För den kärlek jag känner (When Your Heartache is Over) (Tim Norell-Oson-Alexander Bard-Keith Almgren)

== Personnel ==
- Monia Sjöström - vocals
- Mikael Andersen – acoustic guitar, vocals
- Jonas Nilsson - guitar
- Niclas Brandt – keyboard, vocals
- Sid Andersson - bass, vocals
- Peter Clarinsson - drums
