= En på miljonen =

Compilation album by Grönwalls
- Released: 16 November 2005
- Recorded: Mariann Studio, Skara, Sweden; KMH Studio, Stockholm, Sweden
- Genre: dansband music
- Length: circa 55 minutes
- Label: Mariann

Grönwalls chronology
Visa vad du går för (2000)	En på miljonen (2005)

En på miljonen is a 2005 compilation album by Grönwalls.

== Track listing ==
1. Älskar du mig ännu
2. En på miljonen
3. Börja var enkelt
4. Tänk om
5. Vinden har vänt
6. Falling in Love
7. Om jag bara kunde få dig att förstå
8. Meningen med allt
9. Vem
10. Du har det där
11. Regn i mitt hjärta
12. Du ringde från Flen
13. I varje andetag
14. Ett liv tillsammans
15. En plats i solen
16. Jag ringer upp
17. Tillbaks igen

== Charts ==
Chart (2005)	Peak position
Sweden (Sverigetopplistan)	39
