= Erik Karlberg =

Swedish ice hockey player

- Born: May 5, 1988 (age 38) Tyringe, Sweden
- Height: 5 ft 11 in (180 cm)
- Weight: 189 lb (86 kg; 13 st 7 lb)
- Position: Forward
- Shoots: Right
- SEL team: Skellefteå AIK
- Playing career: 2006–present

Erik Karlberg (born May 5, 1988, in Tyringe, Sweden) is a Swedish professional ice hockey player. He is currently playing with Skellefteå AIK in the Elitserien.
