= Hästveda =

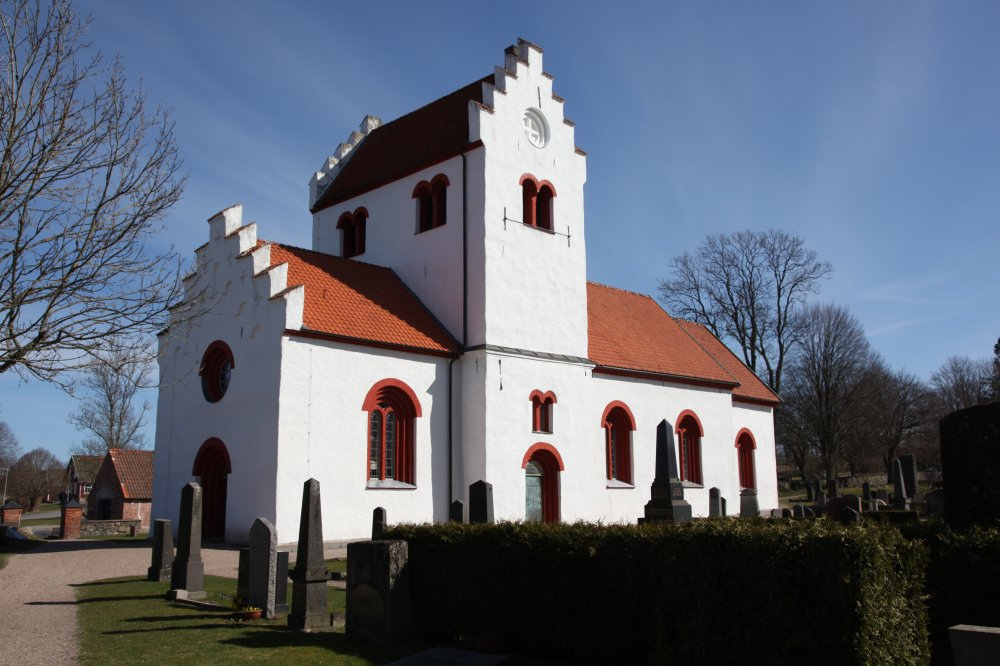
- Hästveda Church

- Location within Scania Location within Sweden Location within European Union
- Coordinates: 56°17′10″N 13°56′10″E
- Country: Sweden
- Province: Scania
- County: Scania County
- Municipality: Hässleholm Municipality

Area
  - Total: 2.49 km^{2} (0.96 sq mi)

Population (31 December 2010)
  - Total: 1,623
  - Density: 652/km^{2} (1,690/sq mi)
- Time zone: UTC+1 (CET)
  - Summer (DST): UTC+2 (CEST)

Hästveda is a locality situated in Hässleholm Municipality, Scania County, Sweden with 1,623 inhabitants in 2010.

The etymology of Hästveda indicates that the name originally signified a wood, or forest where horses were kept.

Hästveda Church is a medieval church with well-preserved both Romanesque and Gothic frescos.

Hästveda railway station is situated on the Southern Main Line and is served by the Växjö–Hässleholm route of the Krösatågen regional rail network.

== Society ==
In central Hästveda is the lake Lilla Sjö, which is part of a recreational area located next to the community park. A hostel is also run in the park during summer.

In Hästveda there is Hästveda church from the 12th century. The church has murals from the 12th and 15th centuries.

To the west of Hästveda is "Barnens by," which is a summer camp owned by Malmö Municipality. 5 km northwest of the town is Åbuamossen, where peat extraction has been conducted since 1905.
