= Tyringe =

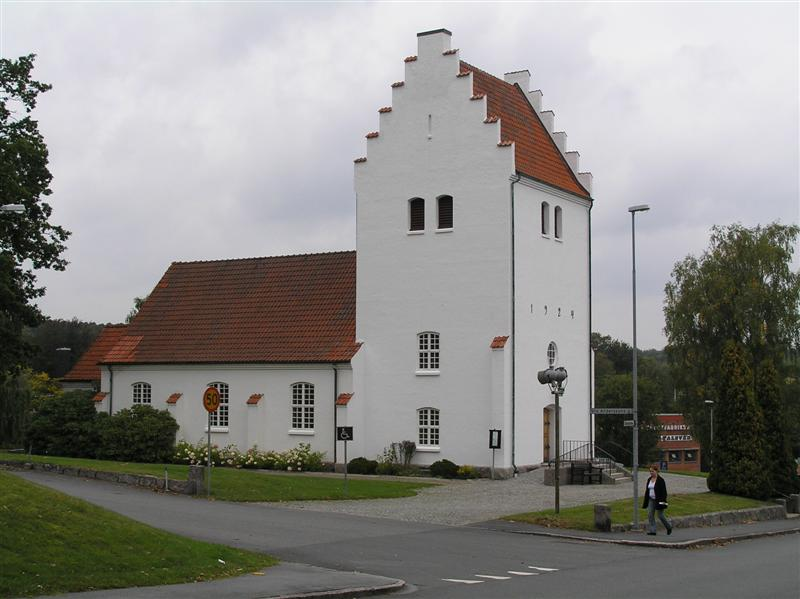
- Tyringe Church

- Location within Scania Location within Sweden Location within European Union
- Coordinates: 56°09′33″N 13°36′03″E
- Country: Sweden
- Province: Scania
- County: Scania County
- Municipality: Hässleholm Municipality

Area
  - Total: 3.95 km^{2} (1.53 sq mi)

Population (31 December 2010)
  - Total: 4,658
  - Density: 1,178/km^{2} (3,050/sq mi)
- Time zone: UTC+1 (CET)
  - Summer (DST): UTC+2 (CEST)

Tyringe is a locality situated in Hässleholm Municipality, Scania County, Sweden with 4,658 inhabitants in 2010.

== History ==
Administratively the place was made a municipal community (municipalsamhälle) within the rural municipalities of Finja and Västra Torup in 1928. In Sweden, the term municipalsamhälle was previously used for certain localities, functioning as a "submunicipality" with certain regulations granted by the king and also in effect for towns. The local government reform of 1952 created Tyringe Municipality out of five former entities. The last four (among them Tyringe) of the once 240 municipalsamhällen were dissolved in 1971. The municipality was amalgamated with Hässleholm Municipality in 1974.

Tyringe was mentioned in writing (with exactly the same spelling as today) in 1530. The name has not been fully interpreted.

By the 17th century, a more organized village center emerged around the village inn. It grew to an urban area after the inception of the railway between Hässleholm and Helsingborg in 1875, and at the turn of the 20th century, it became known as a popular vacation spa town for vacationers arriving to receive mineral cure treatments at the mineral spring. A sanatorium and several hotels and inns were built during this era, including the upscale Tyringe Kurhotell built in 1904.

In 1923, various metalworking industries were established in Tyringe, resulting in a population increase.

Tyringe Church was built in 1925. The architecture includes typical Scanian crow-step gables, and is modeled on Gumlösa Church, which was built in 1191. Since 2006, Tyringe church is no longer open to the public except for mass and various services; it is locked after having been burgled in March 2006, at which time the church's silver chalice, paten and chandeliers, among other things, were stolen. Since the 1990s, Scania has experienced a steady rise in crime. This has affected even smaller urban areas like Tyringe.

Tyringe has two schools, the Tyre School and the Vedhygge School. The Tyre School accommodates pupils from the surrounding villages, including Finja, Hörja, Matteröd, Röke, Västra Torup and other smaller villages.

== Sport and leisure ==
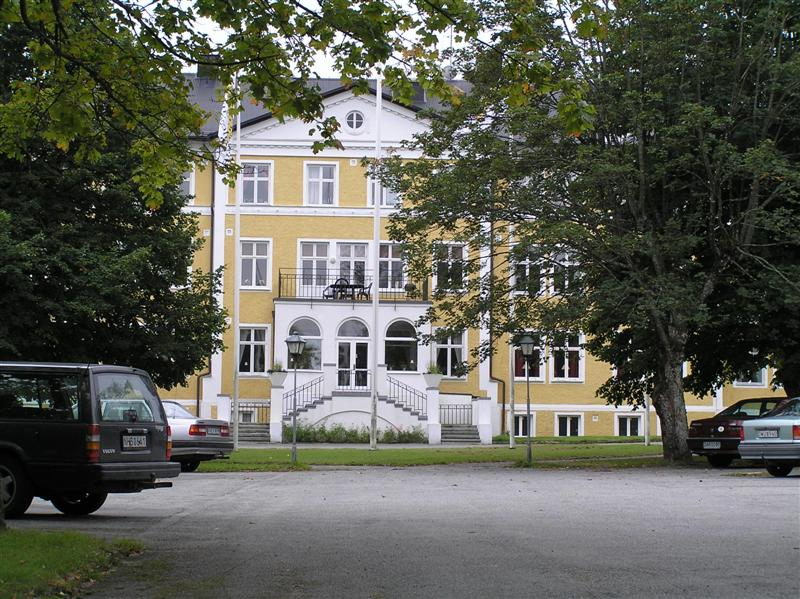
The hotel and spa Tyringe Kurhotell, built in 1904

Tyr Hov sports centre is known throughout the country for the various training camps that are conducted there. It has the following amenities:

- Ice rink
- 25m swimming pool including water flume, child's play pool and outside play pool for summer use
- Bowling hall
- Sports hall
- Outdoor sports ground – grass and gravel football pitches, and athletics track
- Jogging track – 1800m illuminated, 5K, 7K and 10K woodland routes; also used for skiing in the winter
