= Finja Church =

- Finja kyrka
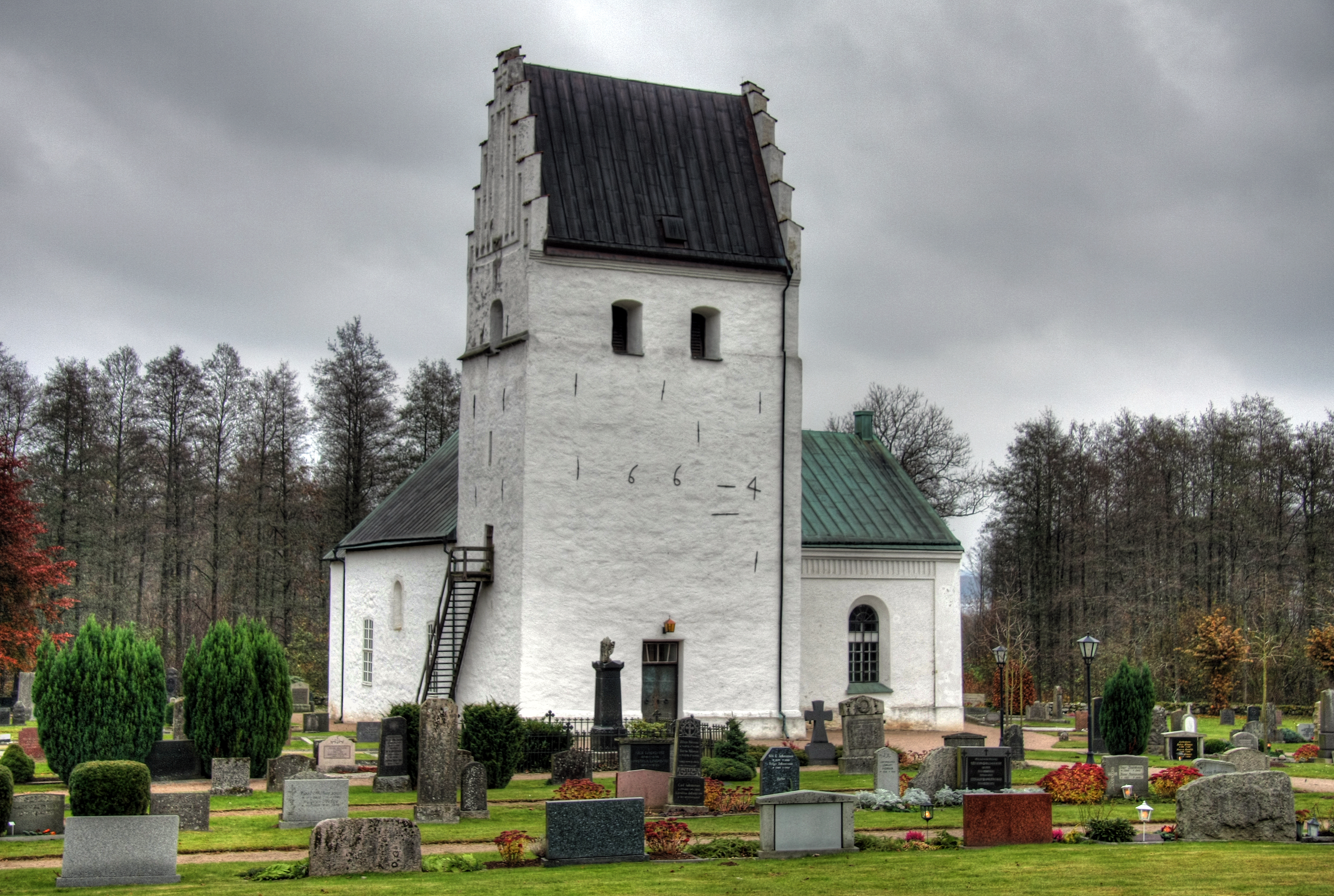
- Finja Church

- Location within Skåne Location within Sweden Location within Europe
- 56°09′30″N 13°41′00″E
- Country: Sweden
- Denomination: Church of Sweden

Finja Church (Swedish: Finja kyrka) is a medieval church in Finja (Hässleholm Municipality) in the province of Skåne, Sweden. The church was built in the 12th century, possibly commissioned by Archbishop Eskil of Lund. The church contains unusually well-preserved Romanesque murals, uncovered in 1931.

== History and architecture ==
The construction period of Finja Church has on stylistic grounds been dated to the 1130s. The Bishop of Lund had holdings in the area in the Middle Ages and it is probable that the church was commissioned by Archbishop Eskil of Lund. It may also have been built for a local lord; at any rate it was not built to serve as a regular parish church. The builder may have been Mårten stenmästare, who was also connected to the building site of Lund Cathedral.

The original church consisted of a nave, chancel and apse. Originally, the nave and chancel were covered with flat, wooden ceilings. A wide western tower was added towards the end of the 12th century. The wooden ceilings were replaced by groin vaults during the late 15th century. At the same time, a church porch was added in front of the southern entrance. The tower underwent changes during the 17th century, and was enlarged by the addition of an extra storey in 1805. In 1857 the medieval church porch was demolished and an extra transept added instead. At the same time, the groin vaults of the nave were replaced by barrel vaults.

In 1932, the medieval murals were uncovered; they were extensively restored in 1981. A major restoration of the entire church was also carried out in 1969–1970.

== Furnishings ==
The baptismal font dates from the late 12th century. The altarpiece is from the 1590s and richly decorated, while the pulpit is from 1599. The church also houses a sculpted funerary monument from 1666, dedicated to the parish priest Christen Willumsen. The current pews are from 1931.

== Murals ==
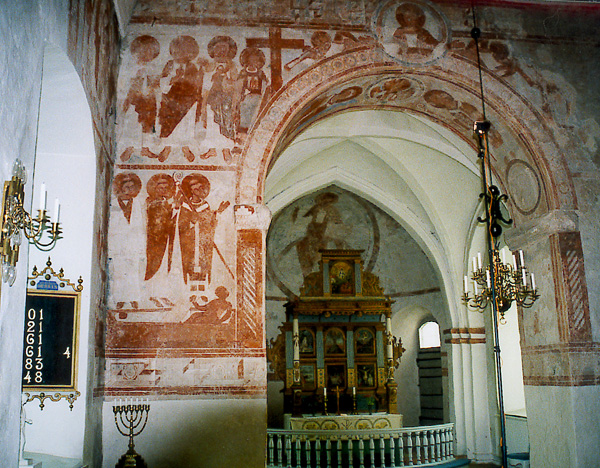
Interior view with the Romanesque murals

Finja Church contains unusually well-preserved Romanesque murals. Stylistically, they are influenced by Byzantine art and have a strict appearance. Because only pigments added al fresco have been preserved, the murals are today dominated by a brownish-red tone, which would not have been the case originally. They date from c. 1140. They decorate the apse and part of the wall facing the chancel; the rest of the murals in the chancel were destroyed when the vaults there were replaced in the 15th century. The murals depict Christ in Majesty in the apse, and on the wall facing the chancel the Last Judgment. Over the entrance to the chancel Christ is depicted as the judge, flanked by angels blowing trumpets. The resurrection of the dead follows, with the blessed gathering at the right hand of Christ, closest to him the Twelve Apostles.

The artists who decorated Finja Church are unknown but on stylistic grounds it has been concluded that the same workshop worked in at least 11 different churches across southern Sweden and Denmark. The subject matter and execution are occasionally so similar that art historians have assumed that the workshop used pattern books. The murals in Finja are considered the main achievement of this group of artists, and therefore the workshop is referred to as the "Finja workshop" or "Finja master".

== See also ==
- Church murals in Sweden
- Church frescos in Denmark
