= Tormestorp =

- Location within Scania Location within Sweden Location within European Union
- Coordinates: 56°07′N 13°44′E
- Country: Sweden
- Province: Scania
- County: Scania County
- Municipality: Hässleholm Municipality

Area
  - Total: 1.03 km^{2} (0.40 sq mi)

Population (31 December 2010)
  - Total: 1,050
  - Density: 1,023/km^{2} (2,650/sq mi)
- Time zone: UTC+1 (CET)
  - Summer (DST): UTC+2 (CEST)

Tormestorp (Swedish pronunciation: [ˈtɔ̂rmɛsˌtɔrp]) is a locality situated in Hässleholm Municipality, Scania County, Sweden with 1,050 inhabitants in 2010.
