= Finja =

- Location within Scania Location within Sweden Location within European Union
- Coordinates: 56°10′N 13°41′E
- Country: Sweden
- Province: Scania
- County: Scania County
- Municipality: Hässleholm Municipality

Area
  - Total: 0.76 km^{2} (0.29 sq mi)

Population (31 December 2010)
  - Total: 535
  - Density: 706/km^{2} (1,830/sq mi)
- Time zone: UTC+1 (CET)
  - Summer (DST): UTC+2 (CEST)

Finja is a locality situated in Hässleholm Municipality, Scania County, Sweden. Finja is located north of Lake Finjasjön, between Hässleholm and Tyringe. The village had a population of 535 inhabitants in 2010.

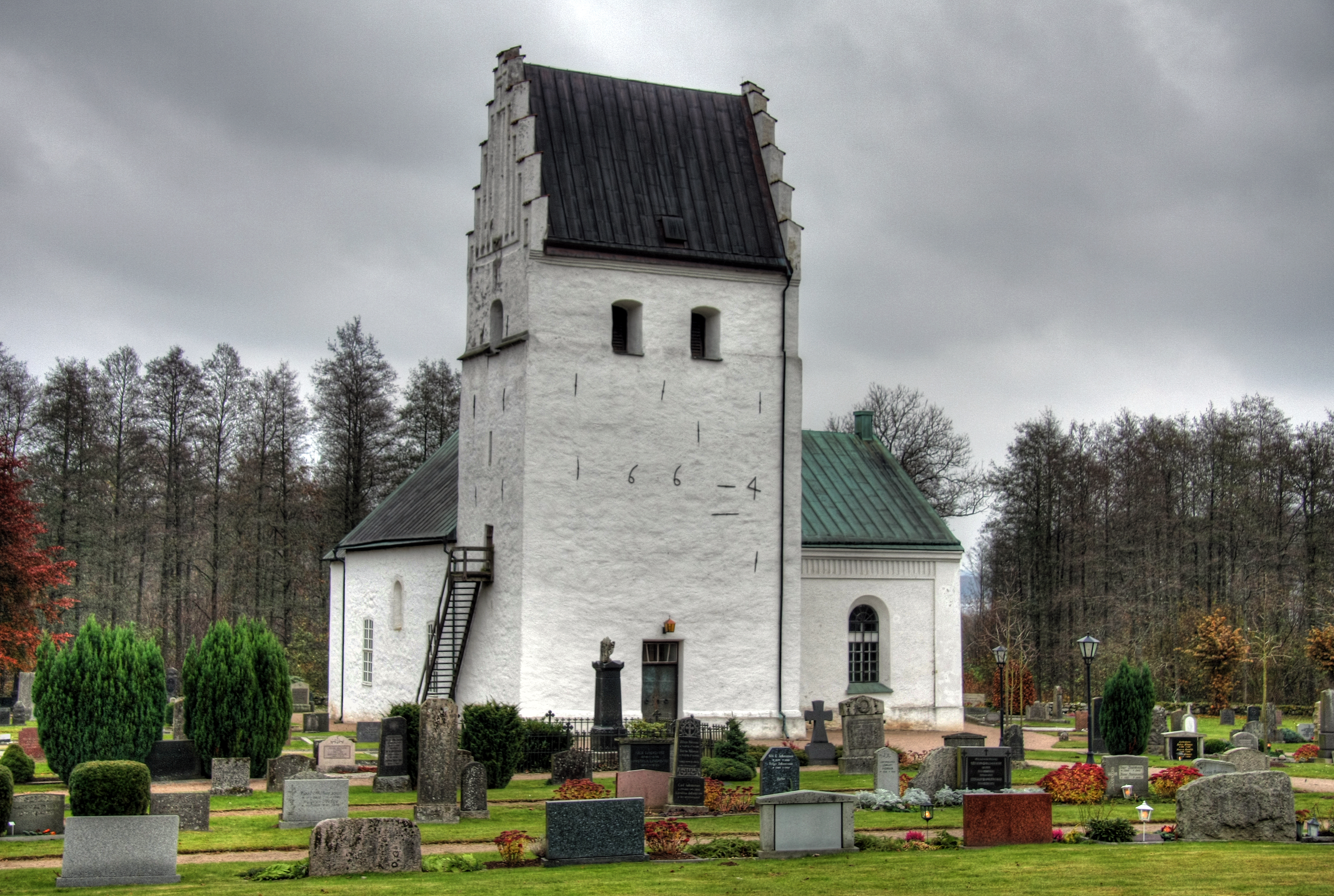
Finja Church

== Finja Church ==
Finja Church is in the parish of Tyringe in the Diocese of Lund. The church was constructed in the middle of the 12th century in a Romanesque style. Inside the church there are murals from the 1140s.
