= Hästveda Church =

- Hästveda kyrka
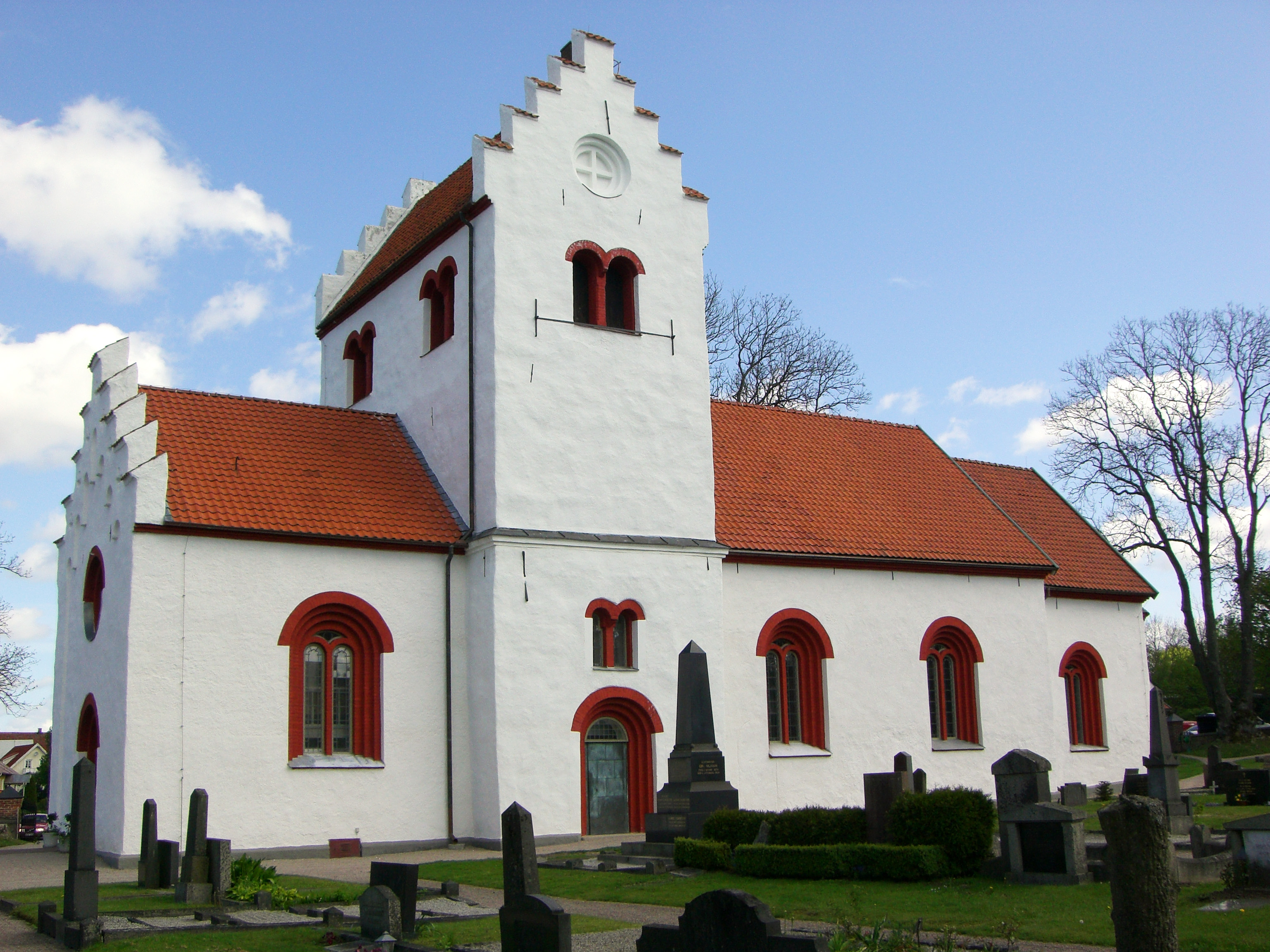
- Hästveda Church

- 56°16′50″N 13°56′57″E
- Country: Sweden
- Denomination: Church of Sweden

Hästveda Church (Swedish: Hästveda kyrka) is a medieval church in Hästveda, in the province of Skåne, Sweden.

== History ==
The church was built at the end of the 12th century, but has undergone several changes throughout its history. A church porch, later demolished, was built during the 15th century and during that century the interior of the church was also remade, and the currently visible Gothic vaults constructed. Substantial changes were also made during the 19th century. The church tower partially collapsed and was rebuilt, albeit lower, to designs by Helgo Zettervall. At the same time, in 1865, the western addition to the church was built. During a restoration in 1939-1940, the medieval murals were discovered under layers of whitewash and uncovered.

== Murals ==
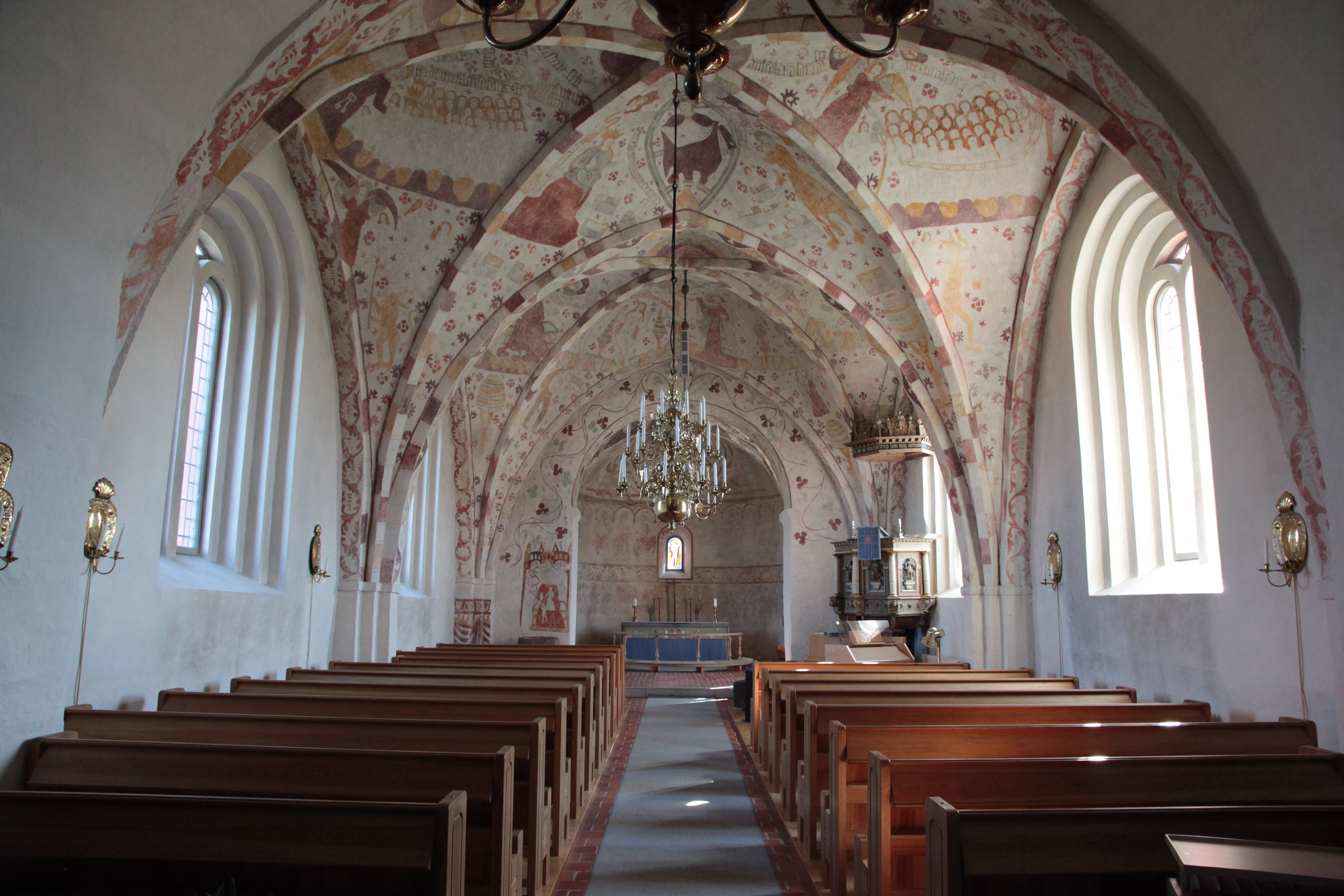
Interior view towards the choir with murals visible

The church is richly decorated with murals from two different time periods. In the apse there are Romanesque murals from the second half of the 13th century, depicting Christ in Majesty surrounded by the symbols of the Four Evangelists. Underneath, the Apostles are depicted in a row. The other set of paintings decorate the vaults in the nave of the church. They are Gothic in style and depict religious scenes from the Bible. They were made some time before 1487, since the coat of arms of two Danish noble families (the province of Skåne was at the time Danish) from Jutland who are known to have owned estates in the area previous to that date decorate the walls. Very probably it was these two families who commissioned the painting of the murals.

== Furnishings ==
The oldest item in the church is the simple baptismal font from the 12th century. The pulpit is from 1598 and made in the workshop of Jacob Kremberg. The altarpiece by Johan Ullberg is from 1774 but was moved from the apse when the murals there were discovered and uncovered. The smaller of the church bells comes from Russia and was brought to Sweden by the lord of Råbelöv Castle, who had served as a colonel in the army. It was bought by the church in 1836.

The church also contains the only runestone in Göinge, the so-called Hästveda stone (Rundata number DR 350 M).
