= Lilla sjö (Hästveda socken, Skåne) =

Lake in Hässleholm Municipality, Sweden

- Lake
- Interactive map of Lilla sjö
- Location: Sweden, Hässleholm Municipality, Skåne County
- Coordinates: 56°16′53.83″N 13°55′27.19″E
- Surface area: 0.144 km^{2} (0.056 sq mi)
- Surface elevation: 57.6 m (189 ft)

Lilla Sjö is a lake in the municipality of Hässleholm in Skåne and is part of the main catchment area of the Helge River. The lake has an area of 0.144 square kilometers and has an elevation of 57.6 meters above sea level. During test fishing, perch, white bream, bream and pike have been caught in the lake.

Until the 1940s, the lake was a bathing lake with a sandy bottom and three bathing places: the ladies', the men's and the priest's. However, due to the lack of a functional wastewater treatment plant, non-existent filtration from peat mining at Åbuamossen, and phosphorus and nitrogen leaks from households and agriculture, it became difficult for the lake to survive on its own.

There is a 2.6 km long illuminated exercise trail around Lilla Sjö. Additionally, there is an outdoor gym by the lake, which is connected to the exercise trail.

== History and conservation ==
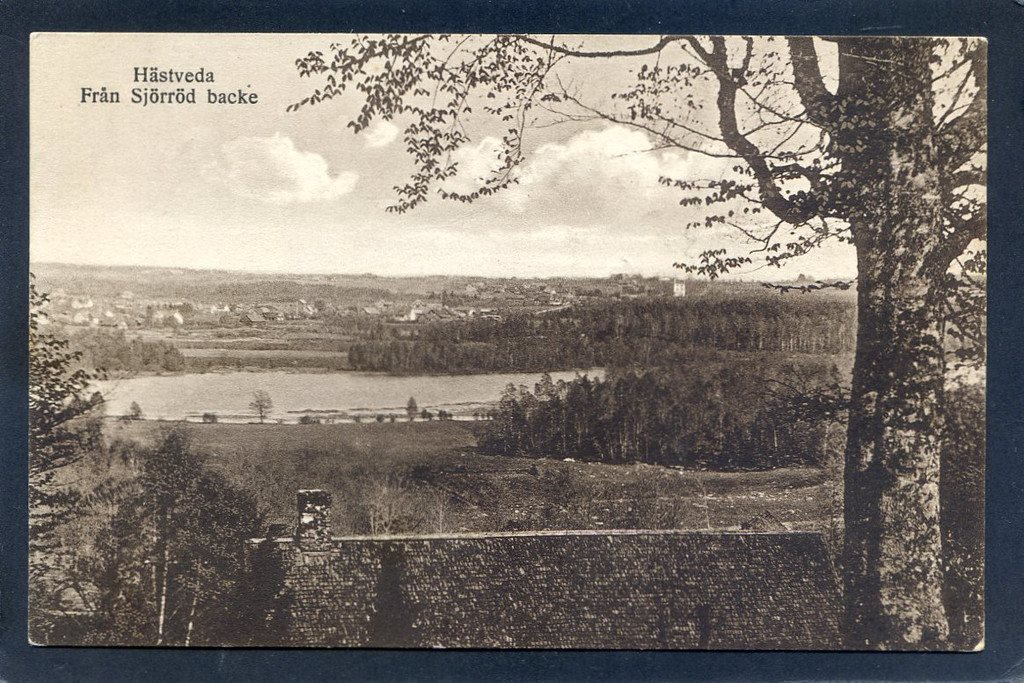
Lilla sjö photographed from west to east. The year is unknown. Hästveda church can be seen in the upper right quarter of the picture. Photographer: Albert Carlsson.

Lilla Sjö has been lowered twice by a total of about 1.8 meters. The first lake lowering occurred in the 1860s when the Southern Main Line was built. The second lowering took place in the early 1900s, with the aim of creating new agricultural land. Today, the water depth is approximately 0.8 to 1 meter

For a long time, the lake has been polluted by untreated sewage, stormwater and peat and humus residues from peat mining at Åbuamossen via Kvarnabäcken. Additionally, residues from local slaughterhouses and dairies have been flushed directly into the lake, sometimes causing it to appear completely white. As a result of this extensive load of nutrients and humus, the lake became heavily eutrophied, which manifested itself partly through overgrowth and partly through heavy blooming of cyanobacteria, mainly Microcystis. The first treatment plant was built in 1961.

In 1977, the Lillasjön Nature Conservation Association was formed. In cooperation with Hässleholm Municipality, they developed an action program for the conservation of the lake. Restoration began in the early 1990s by regulating the water level, cutting reeds, and moving the outlet of the nearby sewage treatment plant to a wetland south of the lake.

The first step in the restoration of Lilla sjö was an extensive water and sewage treatment of Kvarnabäcken, the lake's main tributary. In addition, the footbridge that separated the northern part of the lake from its southern part (which is a wetland) was replaced with a dike that provided some regulation of the water level. Nutrient relief was achieved by relocating the outlet of the treatment plant from the northern to the southern part of the lake. There was an interest in revitalizing and expanding the wetland, prompting the construction of an elongated pond at its outer edge for the outlet. The water from this dam infiltrates the entire length of the wetland, thereby wetting previously dried-up outer areas. The combined effect of these measures was a significant reduction in phosphorus and nitrogen levels in the northern part of the lake, leading to a decrease in algal bloom. The relief of Kvarnabäcken and the relocation of the sewage treatment plant's discharge point greatly improved the situation in the northern part of the lake by the late 1990s.

In 2016 and 2017, a study was carried out to investigate different options for removing some of the lake's bottom sediment. It is estimated that there is approximately 4 meters of bottom sediment, consisting of residues from peat mining on the Åbua bog. The downstream lakes Ottarpasjön and Ballingslövssjön are also under investigation regarding water conservation measures.

== Sub-catchment area ==
Lilla Sjö is part of the sub-catchment area (623467–137980) that SMHI calls 'Mynnar i Almaån.' The average altitude is 70 meters above sea level, and the area covers 43.87 square kilometers. There is an upstream catchment area, and when included, the accumulated area is 65.49 square kilometers. The Lilla å, which drains the catchment area, has a tributary order of 3, indicating that the water flows through a total of 3 watercourses before reaching the sea after traveling 70 kilometers. The catchment area mainly consists of forest (52%), open land (13%), and agriculture (23%). In terms of water surface, the catchment area encompasses 1.2 square kilometers, giving it a lake percentage of 2.7%. The settlements in the area cover 2.57 square kilometers or 6 percent of the catchment area.

== Fish ==
During test fishing, the following fish have been caught in the lake:

- Perch
- White bream
- Freshwater bream
- Pike
- Roach
- Rudd
- Tench

Carp are also reported to be found.
