= Söderns hjärtas ros =

Studio album by Monia Sjöström
- Released: May 2003
- Genre: Country
- Length: circa 53 minutes
- Label: Frituna

Monia Sjöström chronology
Monia (2000)	Söderns hjärtas ros (2003)

Söderns hjärtas ros is a studio album by Monia Sjöström. It was released in May 2003.

== Track listing ==
1. Mannen med gitarr (Per Gessle)
2. En lång väg av längtan (Peter LeMarc)
3. Rakt ut i natten (Mauro Scocco)
4. Kärlekståg till Montréal (Jörgen Smedshammar, Mattias Blomdahl)
5. Den här sortens kärlek (Per "Plura" Jonsson)
6. Ett steg åt ena hållet (Nisse Hellberg)
7. Hej du (Mauro Scocco)
8. Kom genom regnet (Jörgen Smedshammar, Mattias Blomdahl)
9. Du behöver en kvinna (Mauro Scocco)
10. Vägskäl (Shep)
11. Han påminner om dej (Martin Hansen, Mikael Nord Andersson)
12. Gabriel (Mauro Scocco)
13. Söders hjärtas ros (Mats Ronander, Thomas Enochsson)

== Contributing musicians ==
1. Mikael Nord Andersson - guitar, dobro, mandolin, pedal steel
2. Peter Forss – bass
3. Thomas Haglund - violin
4. Christer Jansson - drums
5. Jesper Nordenström - piano, organ, fender rhodes, moog

== Charts ==
Chart (2003)	Peak position
Sweden (Sverigetopplistan)	32
