= Emmaljunga =

- Location within Skåne Location within Sweden
- Coordinates: 56°24′N 13°39′E
- Country: Sweden
- Province: Skåne
- County: Skåne County
- Municipality: Hässleholm Municipality

Area
  - Total: 0.87 km^{2} (0.34 sq mi)

Population (31 December 2010)
  - Total: 262
  - Density: 303/km^{2} (780/sq mi)
- Time zone: UTC+1 (CET)
  - Summer (DST): UTC+2 (CEST)

Emmaljunga is a locality situated in Hässleholm Municipality, Skåne County, Sweden with 262 inhabitants in 2010. It lies on Highway 117 which connects it directly with Hässleholm in the south. The town was founded in 1925.

Emmaljunga Barnvagnsfabrik, the oldest manufacturer of baby strollers in Europe, was founded in Emmaljunga in 1925. It is still owned by its founders, the Persson family.
