= Barbara Bush: A Memoir =

1994 memoir by Barbara Bush

- Author: Barbara Bush
- Genre: Memoir
- Publication date: 1994
- ISBN: 9780025106352

Barbara Bush: A Memoir is a 1994 memoir by Barbara Bush, the wife of U.S. President George H. W. Bush. It was published as a Lisa Drew book by Charles Scribner's Sons.

American film critic Lisa Schwarzbaum in a review for Entertainment Weekly suggested that the memoir allowed the First Lady to reveal her true feelings on current events by subtly criticizing others. Schwartzbam wrote that her "blithe imperiousness and deft passive aggression" was used as a powerful weapon to comment on the lives and activities of political figures and celebrities like Jesse Jackson, Rosalynn Carter, and Cher.
