= Vankiva =

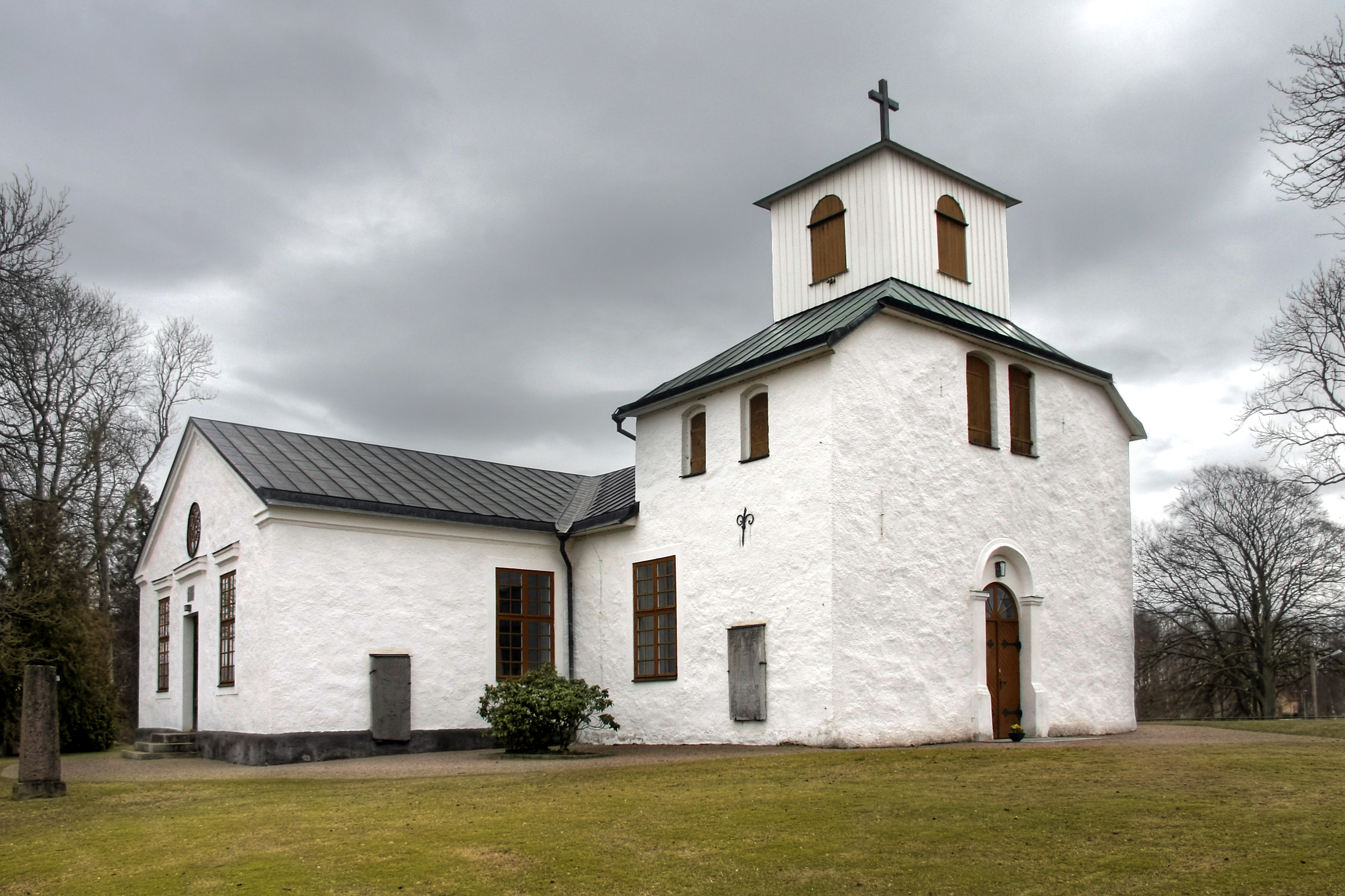
- Vankiva Church

- Location within Scania Location within Sweden Location within European Union
- Coordinates: 56°11′N 13°44′E
- Country: Sweden
- Province: Scania
- County: Scania County
- Municipality: Hässleholm Municipality

Area
  - Total: 0.44 km^{2} (0.17 sq mi)

Population (31 December 2010)
  - Total: 340
  - Density: 772/km^{2} (2,000/sq mi)
- Time zone: UTC+1 (CET)
  - Summer (DST): UTC+2 (CEST)

Vankiva (Swedish pronunciation: [ˈvânːˌɕiːva]) is a locality situated in Hässleholm Municipality, Scania County, Sweden with 340 inhabitants in 2010.

== The society ==
Besides the church (see below) Vankiva used to have a local store, gas station, train station and school (Vankiva School 1916-2010). The store, gas station and school have been sold and re-purposed. After the train station was decommissioned its station building was used by the local Scouts, Malvan of KFUM-KFUK, until it was razed.

Vankiva have large football ground for the local club Vankiva IF with several grass fields and a gravel one. The football club yearly hosts a tournament called Ivar Persson Cup. On the same grounds as the football club is also a community building called Åttingastugan run by the local community and used for holiday celebrations, parties and LAN parties.

== Vankiva Church ==
Vankiva Church is located outside the village center. It was constructed in the 12th century but has been expanded and renovated several times since.
