= Monia Sjöström =

- Born: 21 December 1973 (age 52); Ballingslöv, Sweden
- Genres: country, dansband
- Occupation: singer
- Years active: 1991–
- Formerly of: Grönwalls

Linda Monia Paulette Sjöström (born 21 December 1973, in Ballingslöv) is a Swedish female dansband singer who has sung with Grönwalls, and was one of the band members who in 1991 formed the band, and in 1992 won the Swedish Dansband Championships contest. She also participated in Melodifestivalen 1997 with the song "Nu i dag", ending up 11th.

In February 1999, she was appointed "best dansband voice of Sweden" in the "Får jag lov" magazine. Some months later, she left Grönwalls to start a country music career with the albums "Monia", recorded in the United States, and "Söderns hjärtas ros". Both albums entered the Swedish album chart.

In mid 2004, she returned to Grönwalls, and in 2006 she was awarded the Guldklaven award in the category "Singer of the year" during the Swedish Dansband Week in Malung.

== Solo discography ==
=== Albums ===
- 2000 – Monia
- 2003 – Söderns hjärtas ros

=== Singles ===
- 1997 – Nu i dag / Burnin' For You (released as a Grönwalls single)
- 2003 – Rakt ut i natten / Den här sortens kärlek (released as a Monia single)
