= Jag ringer upp =

Studio album by Grönwalls
- Released: 13 November 1995
- Genre: dansband music
- Length: circa 47 minutes
- Label: Frituna

Grönwalls chronology
En plats i solen (1994)	Jag ringer upp (1995)	Bara vi och månen (1997)

Jag ringer upp is the fourth studio album by Swedish dansband Grönwalls. It was released on 13 November 1995.

== Track listing ==
1. Jag ringer upp
2. Säj minns du parken
3. Om du ger mej tid
4. Funny How Time Slips Away
5. Mr Magic
6. Vad en kvinna vill ha
7. Ge mej en kyss
8. Itsy Bitsy
9. Jag har en dröm
10. Akta dej vad du är min
11. Älskat dig i smyg
12. I vems famn
13. Jag har plats i mitt hjärta
14. Kärleken är

== Charts ==
Chart (1995)	Peak position
Swedish Albums (Sverigetopplistan)	48
