= En plats i solen (Grönwalls album) =

Studio album by Grönwalls
- Released: 24 November 1994
- Genre: dansband music
- Length: 47 minutes
- Label: Frituna

Grönwalls chronology
Högt i det blå (1993)	En plats i solen (1994)	Jag ringer upp (1995)

En plats i solen is the third studio album by Swedish dansband Grönwalls. It was released on 24 November 1994.

== Track listing ==
1. Jag tror på kärleken
2. Ett liv tillsammans
3. Du är min hjärtevän
4. Vindarnas melodi
5. En evig sommar
6. Klackarna i taket
7. En plats i solen
8. Ett album av mitt liv
9. Radio
10. Tidvattensböljor
11. Har du sett stjärnorna
12. Jag har fått nog av dig
13. Don't Touch Me
14. Finns det någon bättre än du
15. Kärlekens språk
