= Jacob Kremberg =

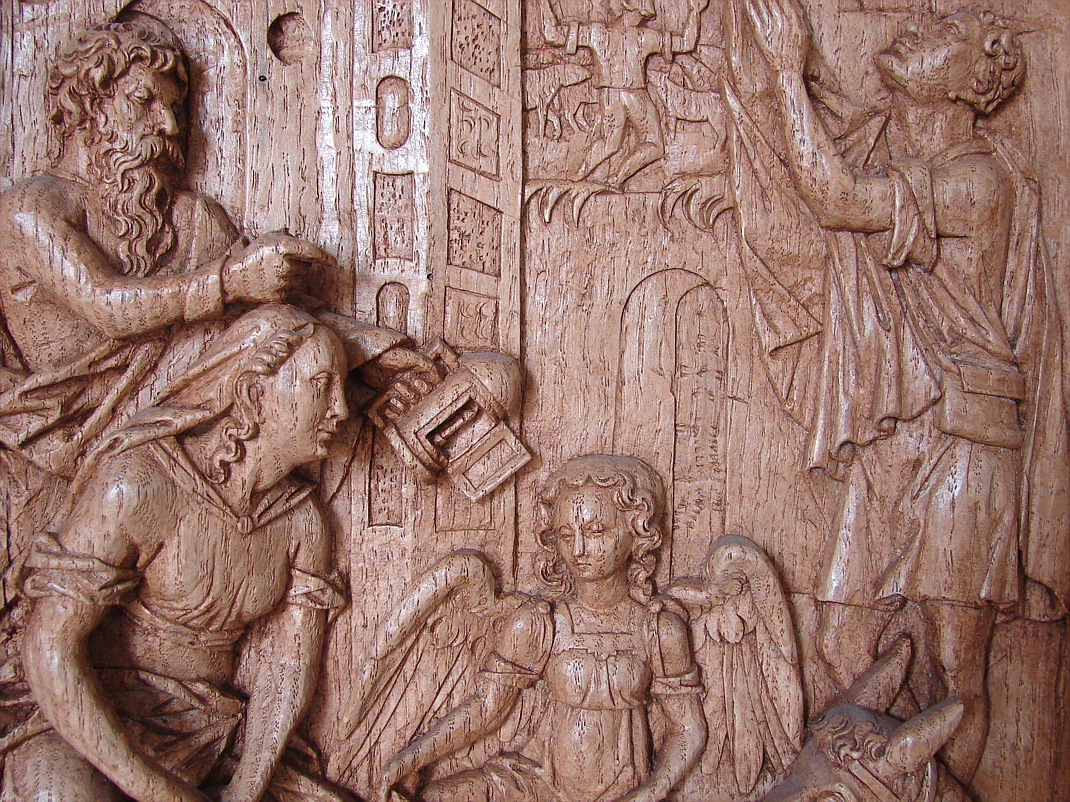
Detail of the pulpit in Höör Church, a work by Kremberg

Jacob Kremberg (sometimes Jakob Kremberg) was a sculptor, working in Scania, present-day Sweden, then Denmark, during the early 17th century.

He was probably born in Schleswig-Holstein and arrived in Lund around 1595 to work on decorations in Lund Cathedral.

He subsequently created many furnishings for churches in Scania, notably pulpits but also altarpieces and baptismal fonts.

His works are characterised by an expressive Northern Renaissance style. Surviving works by Kremberg exist in Gårdstånga, Burlöv, Hästveda, Hammarlunda, Harlösa, Holmby and Västra Sallerup Church.
