= Röke =

Locality in Skåne, Sweden

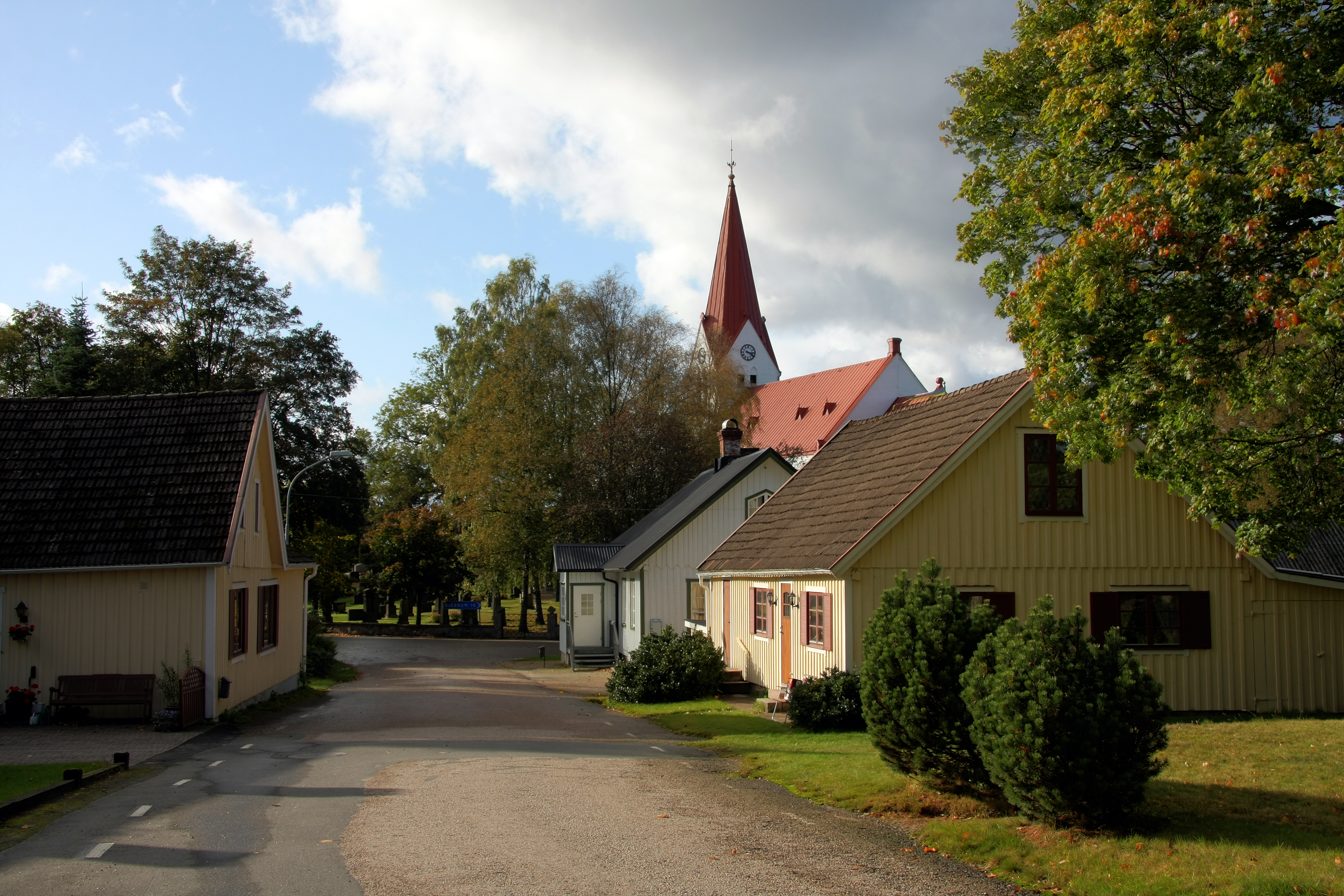
- Röke

- Location within Skåne Location within Sweden
- Coordinates: 56°14′N 13°30′E
- Country: Sweden
- Province: Skåne
- County: Skåne County
- Municipality: Hässleholm Municipality

Area
  - Total: 0.66 km^{2} (0.25 sq mi)

Population (31 December 2010)
  - Total: 219
  - Density: 330/km^{2} (850/sq mi)
- Time zone: UTC+1 (CET)
  - Summer (DST): UTC+2 (CEST)

Röke is a locality situated in Hässleholm Municipality, Skåne County, Sweden with 219 inhabitants in 2010.
