= Högt i det blå =

Studio album by Grönwalls
- Released: 7 October 1993
- Genre: dansband music
- Length: 49 minutes
- Label: Frituna

Grönwalls chronology
Du har det där (1992)	Högt i det blå (1993)	En plats i solen (1994)

Högt i det blå is the second studio album by Swedish dansband Grönwalls. It was released on 7 October 1993.

== Track listing ==
1. Mr Blue Eye
2. Gabriella
3. En calypso om kärleken
4. Vi två har varandra (The Two Step is Easy)
5. Mina röda skor
6. Åh Marie
7. Låt mig komma hem igen
8. Se på mig
9. Högt i det blå
10. Det är min dröm
11. I'm a Believer
12. Ett liv i en drömvärld (Domani, Domani)
13. Varje litet ögonkast (Every Little Thing)
14. Lyckan som du ger
15. Årets sång
