= Visa vad du går för =

Studio album by Grönwalls
- Released: 7 April 2000
- Genre: dansband music
- Length: circa 47 minutes
- Label: Mariann

Grönwalls chronology
Vem (1999)	Visa vad du går för (2000)	En på miljonen (2005)

Visa vad du går för is a 2000 studio album by Swedish dansband Grönwalls. The album is the first with the band's new lead singer, Camilla Lindén.

== Track listing ==
1. Visa vad du går för (T. Pettersson)
2. Alla ord på vägen (C. Kindbom – T. Thörnholm)
3. Jag ger dig min dag (H.Sethsson)
4. Varje gång jag drömmer (L. Holm – G. Lengstrand)
5. Rör vid mig (C. Kindbom – T. Thörnholm)
6. Vertical Expression (D. Bellamy)
7. So Long Bye Bye (B. Nilsson)
8. Två namn i en ring (S. Hoge – P. Barnhart – J.House-H. Krohn)
9. He-man (C. Wedin)
10. Min allra bästa vän (H. Krohn)
11. When Love Starts Talkin' (J. OHara – B. Warfer – G. Nicholson)
12. Tillbaks igen (K.Fingal – H.Krohn)
13. Maniana (A. Anderson – L. White – C. Cannon – K. Almgren)
14. Den allra bästa tiden (A. Överland – C. Lösnitz)
