= Bara vi och månen =

Studio album by Grönwalls
- Released: 17 March 1997
- Genre: dansband music
- Length: circa 48 minutes
- Label: Frituna

Grönwalls chronology
Jag ringer upp (1995)	Bara vi och månen (1997)	Vem (1999)

Bara vi och månen is a 1997 studio album by Swedish dansband Grönwalls.

== Track listing ==
1. Bara vi och månen
2. Säj minns du parken
3. Om du ger mej tid
4. Funny How Time Slips Away
5. Mr Magic
6. Vad en kvinna vill ha
7. Ge mej en kyss
8. Itsy Bitsy
9. Jag har en dröm
10. Akta dej vad du är min
11. Älskat dig i smyg
12. I vems famn
13. Jag har plats i mitt hjärta
14. Kärleken är

== Charts ==
Chart (1997)	Peak position
Swedish Albums (Sverigetopplistan)	24
