= Du ringde från Flen =

Song by Grönwalls

from the album "Du har det där"
- Language: Swedish
- Released: 1992
- Genre: dansband music
- Label: Frituna
- Songwriter: Ulf Nordquist
- Composer: Ulf Nordquist

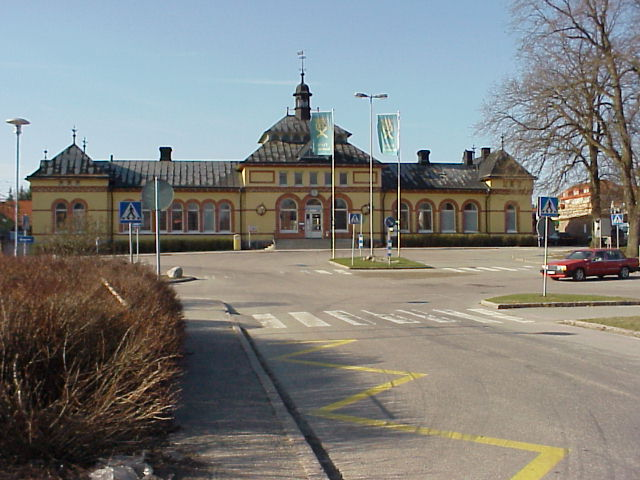
Flen

Du ringde från Flen is a song written by Ulf Nordquist, and originally recorded by Grönwalls on the debut album Du har det där in 1992. Ending up third in the 1992 edition of the music competition "Höstens melodier", it is one of Grönwall's most well-known songs. The song was also tested for Svensktoppen, where it charted for listan 13 weeks between 3 July-18 September 1993.

In the song lyrics, the I person, probably a girl/woman, sings about the you person always works overtime and travels around Sweden, blaming it on meetings and visiting relatives, but the I person suspects oninfidelity. Five towns in Sweden are mentioned in the song lyrics; Flen, Luleå, Hässleholm, Halmstad and Laholm.

At Dansbandskampen 2008, the song was performed by Shake, in a calm ballad tempo. Shake's version was released in January 2009 for digital download. At Dansbandskampen 2009, the song was used during Sveriges Television's information.

A version in Swedish radio program Framåt fredag was called "Han ringde Hamrén" and was about Lars Lagerbäck leaving his job as manager for the Sweden men's national soccer team.
