= Västra Torup =

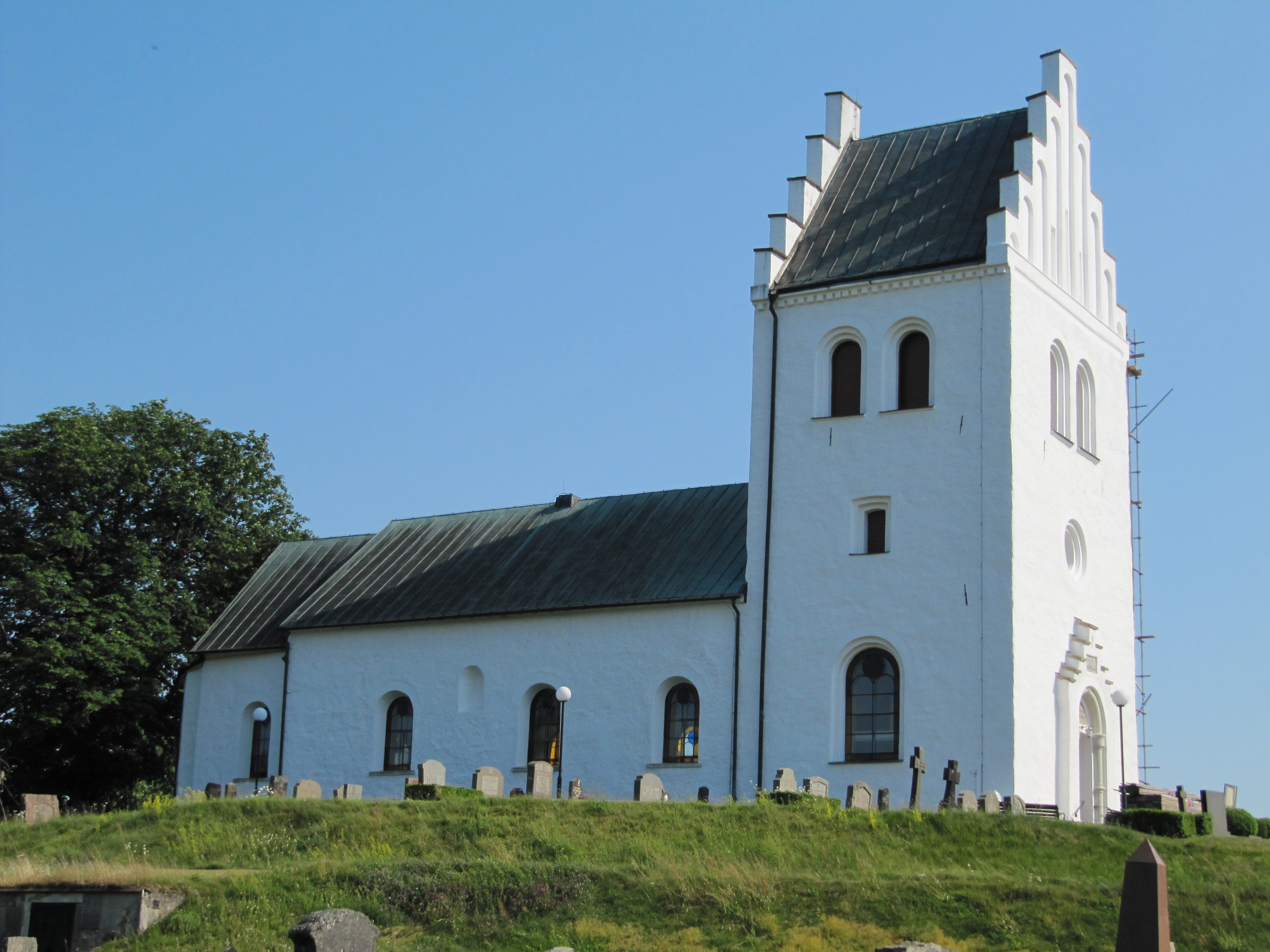
- Västra Torup Church

- Location within Skåne Location within Sweden
- Coordinates: 56°09′N 13°29′E
- Country: Sweden
- Province: Skåne
- County: Skåne County
- Municipality: Hässleholm Municipality

Area
  - Total: 0.59 km^{2} (0.23 sq mi)

Population (31 December 2005)
  - Total: 210
  - Density: 358/km^{2} (930/sq mi)
- Time zone: UTC+1 (CET)
  - Summer (DST): UTC+2 (CEST)

Västra Torup is a minor locality situated in Hässleholm Municipality, Skåne County, Sweden with 198 inhabitants in 2010 down from 210 in 2005, Västra Torup is no longer classified as an urban area by Statistics Sweden.

== Attractions ==
The Ingelbo Moose Park is located in Hissmossa north of Västra Torup
