= Lisa Drew =

Lisa Drew is a retired editor who held top editorial positions at Doubleday, William Morrow and Company, and Scribner. Drew was an editor for Pulitzer Prize-winning Roots: The Saga of an American Family as well as numerous books by the Bush family. Other notable authors she edited include Helen Thomas, Nathan Miller, John E. Douglas, Bruce Henderson, Christine Brennan, and Geraldine Ferraro. At Scribner, Drew created her own imprint, A Lisa Drew Book.

== Career ==
=== Doubleday ===
Lisa Drew began her publishing career in the production department at Doubleday in 1961 where she rose to editor-in-chief by 1979. At one point, Drew was an assistant to Kenneth McCormick who oversaw such authors as Leon Uris, Irving Stone, Dwight Eisenhower and Richard Nixon.The first book that Drew acquired for Doubleday was Methods of Childbirth by Constance A. Bean and published in 1972 and still in publication as of 1999. Drew stated that this was one of the first books to cover the different options for childbirth for women.

Drew described the changes to the publishing industry with regards to women editors in the early 1970s in an interview with Art Silverman. She stated that it was "slow-going" for women. Doubleday didn't promote women into editorial positions and she was only the fourth woman editor. Around 1970 that began to change as women started to come in at the assistant editor level. At the same time, Drew and other women editors at Doubleday were derisively referred to as "the brides of Doubleday." Harriet Rubin noted that these "brides" were influencers. Rubin said, "they shaped the cultural conversation through the books they edited. Editor is a formidable stealth position: An editor can launch twenty books a year into the culture, a writer maybe one every few years."

Lisa Drew, along with Ken McCormick, was the editor for Alex Haley's Pulitzer Prize-winning book, Roots: The Saga of an American Family. Alex Haley first met with Lisa Drew and Ken McCormick about the book in 1964. Drew thought that the project was exciting and that to her knowledge, "no black writer had ever traced his origins back through slavery." Haley was signed to Doubleday with and an advance of $5,000. Drew later stated that it was soon apparent that the project was evolving into something much bigger than originally planned by Haley. Haley's work on the book dragged on for several years and Drew protected Haley from Doubleday executives who wanted Haley to either write the book or return the book's advance. At one point, Drew traveled to visit Haley in Jamaica in 1975 expecting to take back a finished manuscript and was surprised to find only 70% of the book done and another editor, Murray Fisher, who considered himself to be Alex Haley's personal editor, in residence and working on the book. While Haley wrote on the porch, Drew read the manuscript inside the house. Doubleday did not receive the book from Haley until 1976, ten years past its initial contracted due date.

Haley credited Drew for coming up with the sub-title for the book, "The Saga of an American Family."

When first released, Roots was labeled as non-fiction. Drew stated that she pushed for the non-fiction label and Ken McCormick stated that he considered the book fiction, but deferred to Drew on the matter. Drew was afraid that "if we called this book fiction, although it had fictional elements in it, the people who are not sympathetic to the viewpoint of the book would use that as an excuse to say...this is fiction and it is all made up and it didn't happen that way. Haley himself called the book, "faction," a mix of fiction and facts. Later Haley was accused of plagiarizing parts of the book from the book, the African by Harold Courlander. While Haley ended up settling out-of-court with Courlander, Drew didn't believe he should have settled and said he should have paid a personal permission fee.

Lisa Drew became a colleague and friend to Jackie Kennedy Onassis. They met in 1978 while working as editors at Doubleday and remained friends until Onassis' death.

Drew was promoted to executive director and editorial director of Doubleday General Books in 1979.

=== William Morrow and Company ===
Drew left Doubleday in 1985 to join William Morrow and Company as a vice-president and senior editor.

=== Scribners ===
Drew left William Morrow in 1992 to form her own imprint, A Lisa Drew Book, at Scribners which was then owned by Macmillan. Lisa Drew Books began publishing books in 1993. Simon & Schuster purchased Macmillan/Scribners in 1994 and Lisa Drew Books continued as an imprint at Simon & Schuster.

Drew was the editor for many books by the Bush family including Barbara Bush and George H. W. Bush beginning with C. Fred's Story, a children's book about their pet Spaniel. Barbara Bush described Drew in her memoir as a "bright, feisty, funny lady." Bush described Drew in her Reflections memoir as having a very active red pencil and not being a tactful editor. "Lisa hates exclamation points. She is not crazy about the words "dearest," as in "dearest friends"; "greatest," as in "greatest children" or grandchildren; "best," as in "best friend." Lisa actually became a great friend and if she behaves, she will be in danger of becoming a great dearest best friend.

Drew was the chairman of the Freedom to Read Committee of the Association of American Publishers in 1998 while Vice-President and Publisher for Scribner and Lisa Drew Books.

Drew retired as publisher from the imprint Lisa Drew Books in 2006.

== Notable authors ==
- George H. W. Bush
- Barbara Bush
- Christine Brennan
- John E. Douglas
- Nathan Miller
- Geraldine Ferraro
- Alex Haley
- Bruce Henderson
- Caroline Kennedy
- Howell Raines
- Helen Thomas

== Notable Books Published as A Lisa Drew Book ==
- All the Best, George Bush: My Life in Letters and Other Writings by George H. W. Bush
- Barbara Bush: A Memoir by Barbara Bush
- Edith and Woodrow: The Wilson White House by Phyllis Lee Levin
- Inside Edge: A Revealing Journey Into the Secret World of Figure Skating by Christine Brennan
- Jimmy Carter: A Comprehensive Biography from Plains to Post-presidency by Peter G. Bourne
- Journey Into Darkness by John Douglas and Mark Olshaker
- Obsession by John Douglas and Mark Olshaker
- Thanks for the memories, Mr. President: Wit and Wisdom from the Front Row at the White House by Helen Thomas
- The Breach: Inside the Impeachment and Trial of William Jefferson Clinton by Peter Baker
- Trace Evidence: The Hunt for an Elusive Serial Killer by Bruce Henderson
- Vladimir Putin's Russia and the End of the Revolution by Peter Baker and Susan Glasser
