= Ballingslöv =

Swedish locality

- Location within Skåne Location within Sweden
- Coordinates: 56°13′N 13°51′E
- Country: Sweden
- Province: Skåne
- County: Skåne County
- Municipality: Hässleholm Municipality

Area
  - Total: 0.58 km^{2} (0.22 sq mi)

Population (31 December 2010)
  - Total: 310
  - Density: 533/km^{2} (1,380/sq mi)
- Time zone: UTC+1 (CET)
  - Summer (DST): UTC+2 (CEST)

Ballingslöv is a locality situated in Hässleholm Municipality, Skåne County, Sweden with 310 inhabitants in 2010.
