= Grönwalls =

Swedish dansband

- Origin: Hässleholm, Sweden
- Genres: Dansband music
- Years active: 1991–

Grönwalls is a dansband from Hässleholm in Sweden. The band won the Swedish dansband championships in Sunne in August 1992. Famous hit songs include Du ringde från Flen from 1993 and Ett liv tillsammans, written by Calle Kindbom and Peo Pettersson, topping Svensktoppen in 1995, as well as Regn i mitt hjärta from 1996.

Several band members also participated in the side project Grönrock, which in mid 2008 played with Dan Hylander. In October 2008, the band announced a break from New Year 2008-2009.

In November–December 2009, the band announced its comeback.

== Members ==
=== Members ===
- Monia Sjöström - vocals
- Niclas Brandt - keyboard, Members
- Mikael Andersen - acoustic guitar, Members
- Peter Clarinsson - drums
- Jonas Zetterman - guitar
- Sid Andersson - bass

=== Former members ===
- Camilla Lindén - vocals, 1999–2001
- Madlén Trasthe - vocals, 2001–2004
- Thomas Wennerström - bass, 2003–2008
- Mattias Fredriksson- bass, 2008–2009
- Johan Fredriksson - drums, 2008–2009
- Andy Lundberg - drums, 2000–2008

== Discocraphy ==
=== Studio albums ===
- Du har det där - 1992
- Högt i det blå - 1993
- En plats i solen - 1994
- Jag ringer upp - 1995
- Bara vi och månen - 1997
- Vem - 1999
- Visa vad du går för - 2000

=== Compilation albums / Other albums ===
- Du ringde från Flen - 1994
- Ett liv tillsammans - 1996
- På begäran - 1997
- Regn i mitt hjärta - 1998
- I varje andetag - 1999
- Tillbaks igen - 2000
- En på miljonen - 2005
- Du ringde från Flen - 2008
- Favoriter 1 - 2011

== Svensktoppen songs ==
- Du ringde från Flen - 1993
- Du har det där - 1993
- Ett liv tillsammans - 1995
- En plats i Solen - 1995
- Jag ringer upp - 1996
- Regn i mitt hjärta - 1997
- Nu i dag - 1997
- Bara vi och månen - 1997
- I varje andetag - 1998–1999
- Vem - 1999–2000
- Ännu en dag - 2000
- Tillbaks igen" - 2000

=== Tested for Svensktoppen, failed to enter chart ===
- För den kärlek jag känner - 1992 (8 November) (single 1992)
- Vägen till mitt hjärta - 1998–1999
- Rör vid mig - 2000
- Stjärnorna vet - 2002
- Falling in Love - 2006
