= Hässleholm Municipality =

Hässleholm Municipality Hässleholms kommun
- Municipality
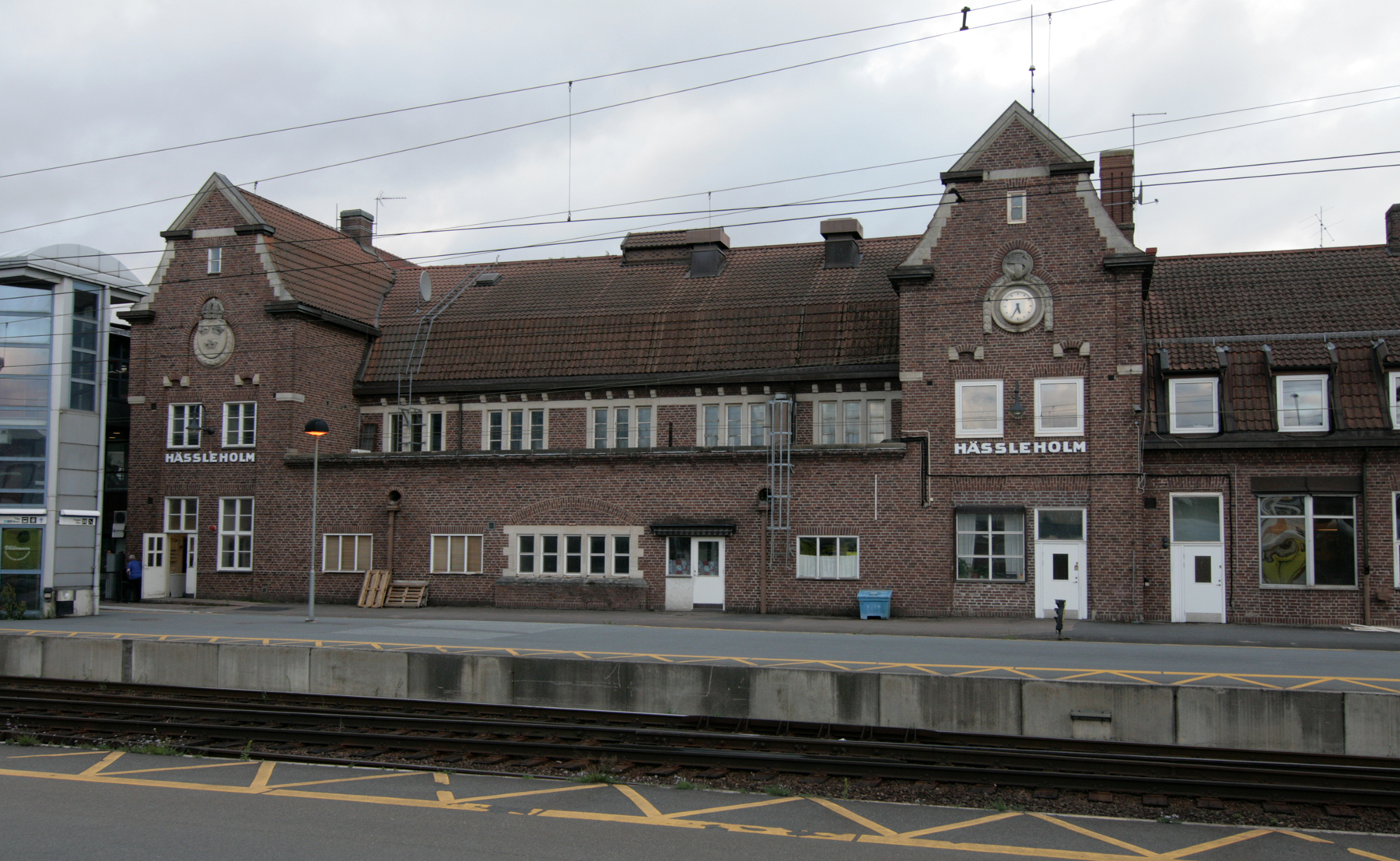
- Hässleholm Railway Station

- Flag Coat of arms

- Coordinates: 56°10′N 13°46′E
- Country: Sweden
- County: Scania County
- Seat: Hässleholm

Area
  - Total: 1,306.27 km^{2} (504.35 sq mi)
  - Land: 1,268.53 km^{2} (489.78 sq mi)
  - Water: 37.74 km^{2} (14.57 sq mi)
- Area as of 1 January 2014.

Population (30 June 2025)
  - Total: 52,062
  - Density: 41.041/km^{2} (106.30/sq mi)
- Time zone: UTC+1 (CET)
  - Summer (DST): UTC+2 (CEST)
- ISO 3166 code: SE
- Province: Scania
- Municipal code: 1293
- Website: www.hassleholm.se

Hässleholm Municipality (Swedish: Hässleholms kommun) is a municipality in Scania County in southern Sweden. Its seat is located in the city Hässleholm.

The present municipality was created in 1974 when the former City of Hässleholm, itself incorporated in 1914, was amalgamated with seven surrounding municipalities. In 1863, there were 29 local government units, all rural, in the area.

The municipal coat of arms was granted in 1920 and registered for the new municipality in 1974. The cross symbolizes the railway junction, which is the origin of the town Hässleholm. The hazelnuts allude to the name Hässleholm, which roughly translates as "Hazel-isle".

== Geography ==
At 1,306.27 km^{2} Hässleholm is the second largest municipality in Skåne County by total area. By land area Hässleholm is the largest in Scania County with 1,268.53 km^{2} (Kristianstad Municipality short after with 1,246.25 km^{2}), much due to its relatively small water area of 37.74 km^{2}.

=== Localities ===
There are 17 urban areas (also called a Tätort or locality) in Hässleholm Municipality.

In the table the localities are listed according to the size of the population as of December 31, 2020. The municipal seat is in bold characters.

#	Locality	Population
1	**Hässleholm**	19,435
2	Tyringe	4,752
3	Vinslöv	4,113
4	Bjärnum	2,762
5	Sösdala	1,835
6	Vittsjö	1,796
7	Hästveda	1,731
8	Sjörröd	1,470
9	Tormestorp	1,097
10	Stoby	747
11	Finja	530
12	Vankiva	387
13	Ballingslöv	361
14	Emmaljunga	313
15	Mala	223
16	Hörja	211
17	Västra Torup	211

== Demographics ==
This is a demographic table based on Hässleholm Municipality's electoral districts in the 2022 Swedish general election sourced from SVT's election platform, in turn taken from SCB official statistics.

In total there were 52,201 residents, including 39,480 Swedish citizens of voting age. 37.1% voted for the left coalition and 61.7% for the right coalition.

Location	Residents	Citizen adults	Left vote	Right vote	Employed	Swedish parents	Foreign heritage	Income SEK	Degree
Location			%	%					
Ballingslöv	1,219	946	31.2	67.0	79	87	13	23,799	33
Bjärnum N	1,738	1,255	33.1	65.6	78	75	25	22,900	28
Bjärnum S	1,556	1,093	33.2	65.5	72	74	26	20,659	28
Bokalyckan	1,228	1,031	44.8	54.5	74	74	26	22,655	42
Bokeberg	1,495	1,290	45.2	53.0	72	74	26	18,498	35
Djupadal	1,272	1,032	37.7	61.4	78	76	24	23,650	40
Finja	1,498	1,136	34.9	64.5	82	88	12	26,130	33
Fredentorp	1,199	987	40.9	58.0	78	81	19	21,123	29
Gäddastorp	1,137	873	36.0	63.5	84	82	18	28,937	52
Haga	1,484	1,061	47.3	51.7	65	59	41	18,131	30
Hässleholm C	1,500	1,187	40.0	58.2	72	64	36	20,364	36
Hästveda V	1,357	1,028	33.0	65.2	80	88	12	23,825	30
Hästveda Ö	1,531	1,074	33.2	65.5	73	77	23	20,860	27
Kristinehem-Ekedal	1,504	1,123	40.6	58.5	85	71	29	28,337	52
Ljungdala	1,642	1,272	48.8	50.1	84	69	31	26,322	42
Läreda	1,635	1,042	64.1	32.0	59	26	74	16,009	28
Röke-Hörja	1,540	1,167	29.3	69.2	80	89	11	23,281	33
Sjörröd	1,576	1,180	30.9	68.3	87	90	10	31,310	52
Stattena	1,717	1,291	36.5	62.0	81	73	27	25,939	39
Stoby-Ignaberga	1,823	1,351	31.1	68.5	85	86	14	27,078	40
Sösdala V	1,567	1,165	40.6	58.7	77	80	20	21,602	32
Sösdala Ö	1,430	1,017	36.4	62.7	73	83	17	21,926	32
T4-området	1,510	1,235	41.4	58.0	70	68	32	21,410	34
Tormestorp	1,401	1,071	33.3	65.5	85	90	10	28,531	43
Tyringe N	1,615	1,178	36.4	61.4	73	72	28	20,889	30
Tyringe S	1,643	1,280	32.8	65.7	78	86	14	22,751	36
Tyringe V	1,709	1,263	39.0	59.9	71	78	22	19,878	27
Vankiva	1,225	966	30.5	68.4	83	87	13	26,150	35
Vinslöv C	1,894	1,499	36.3	63.2	82	91	9	23,689	32
Vinslöv N	1,804	1,375	34.0	65.2	81	91	9	23,967	34
Vinslöv S	1,865	1,380	31.0	68.3	87	90	10	26,480	32
Vittsjö C	1,783	1,321	35.8	62.8	72	78	22	21,014	34
Vittsjö	1,300	983	27.4	71.2	76	85	15	21,579	33
Östervärn-Röinge	1,804	1,328	42.6	56.9	84	76	24	27,566	46
Source: SVT

== Industry ==
- Hässleholms Workshops
- Göinge Mechanical Workshop
- Hässleholms Brewery
- Hässleholms Kapsyl- och Stanniolfabrik
- Hässleholms Filfabrik

== Sport in Hässleholm ==
- IFK Hässleholm

== Twin towns ==
- Darłowo, Poland
- Eckernförde, Germany
- Nykøbing-Rørvig, Denmark

== Notable residents ==
- Bengt Bauler
- Johan T Karlsson
- Ida-Theres Nerell
- Pia Hansen
- Andreas Tilliander
- Grönwalls
- Andreas Dahl, football (soccer) player
- Jon Jönsson, football (soccer) player
- Ingrid Swede, film
- Jan Brink
- Åke "Kometen" Persson
- Jeanette Thelander
- Anders S. Nilsson
- Glenn Wish
- Neneh Cherry, Swedish-American singer raised here sporadically throughout her childhood
- Martin Ingvarsson
- Joddla med Siv
- Freddie Ljungberg, footballer born in Vittsjö, but grew up in Halmstad
- Nilla Fischer, footballer
- Gustav Fridolin, Sweden's youngest parliament member, now a journalist for Kalla Fakta
- Bildsköne Bengtsson
- Peps Persson, musician
- KG Hammar, former archbishop
- Gunhild Sehlin
