= Seip =

Seip is a surname. Notable people with the surname include:

- Andreas Martin Seip (1790–1850), Norwegian military officer and politician
- Anne-Lise Seip (born 1933), Norwegian historian and former politician
- Didrik Arup Seip (1884-1963), Norwegian professor of northern Germanic languages
- Hans Kristian Seip (1881-1945), Norwegian engineer and politician
- Hans Kristian Seip (forester) (1920–2012), Norwegian professor and politician
- Hans Martin Seip (born 1937), Norwegian chemist
- Helge Seip (1919-2004), Norwegian politician
- Jens Arup Seip (1905-1992), Norwegian historian, husband of Anne-Lise Seip
- Karl Seip (1850-1909), Norwegian priest, educator, and briefly Minister of Education and Church Affairs
- Kristian Seip (born 1962), Norwegian mathematician
- Marcel Seip (born 1982), Dutch footballer
- Tim Seip (born 1969), American politician

== See also ==
- Seip mountain, Norway, named after Karl Seip
- Seip House, in Chillicothe, Ohio, on the National Register of Historic Places
- Search engine image protection, designed to protect a company or brand against negative publicity
- Seipsville Hotel, also known as Seip's Hotel or Seip's Tavern
