= Kramgoa låtar 16 =

Studio album by Vikingarna
- Released: March 1988
- Recorded: Soundtrade Studios, Solna, Sweden, December 1987-February 1988
- Genre: Dansband music
- Label: NMG

Vikingarna chronology
Kramgoa låtar 15 (1987)	Kramgoa låtar 16 (1988)	Kramgoa låtar 17 (1989)

Kramgoa låtar 16 is a studio album by Vikingarna released in 1988. For the album, the band was awarded a Grammis Award in the "Dansband of the Year" category.

== Track listing ==
1. Lördagsafton (S.Möller-M.Winald)
2. Tredje gången gillt (with Annika Hagström och Jacob Dahlin) (Lennart Sjöholm-Lars Westmann-Jacob Dahlin)
3. Den gamle vandringsmannen (Martin Klaman-Keith Almgren)
4. En liten människa (Nannini-Pianigiani-Monica Forsberg)
5. Hela veckan längtar jag till fredag (L.Holm)
6. Vernissage (R.Pauls-Jacob Dahlin)
7. 100 % (Torgny Söderberg-Monica Forsberg)
8. Romantica (A.Melander)
9. När det våras i bland bergen (R.Sauer-M.H.Woolsey-S.O.Sandberg)
10. Sommarnatt (G.Stevens-M.Schrader)
11. Får jag lämna några blommor (Martin Klaman-Keith Almgren)
12. Dagen är din (S.Kristiansen)
13. Tiotusen röda rosor (Thore Skogman)
14. Dä årner sä (O.Bredahl-Alfson)
15. Längtan hem (L.Holm)

== Charts ==
Chart (1988)	Peak position
Norway	6
Sweden	11
