= Tredje gången gillt =

Single by Vikingarna, Annika Hagström, Jacob Dahlin

from the album Kramgoa låtar 16
- A-side: "Tredje gången gillt"
- B-side: "Tiotusen röda rosor"
- Released: 1988
- Genre: dansband
- Label: Skandinaviska musikgruppen
- Songwriters: Jacob Dahlin, Lennart Sjöström, Lasse Westmann

"Tredje gången gillt" is a song written by Lasse Westmann, Lennart Sjöholm and Jacob Dahlin, and originally performed by Christer Sjögren, Annika Hagström and Jacob Dahlin. The song was also included on Vikingarna's 1988 album Kramgoa låtar 16.

The song charted at Svensktoppen for nine weeks during the period of 8 May to 11 September, peaking at second position.

The song has been recorded by Canyons orkester and Kjelleriks for the album 88 (1988). and by Jontez for the album Om du vill så ska jag gå (2008).
