= Hans Martin =

Hans Martin or Hans-Martin may refer to:

== People with the personal name ==
- Hans Martin (cyclist), Swiss cyclist
- Hans Martin (singer), Swedish-Finnish singer

== People with the given name ==
- Hans Martin Gulbrandsen (1914–1979), Norwegian sprint canoer
- Hans Martin Hanssen (1911–1971), Norwegian politician
- Hans-Martin Linde (born 1930), German flute and recorder player
- Hans Martin Pippart (1888–1918), German pioneer aircraft manufacturer and early pilot
- Hans-Martin Sass (born 1935), German bioethicist
- Hans Martin Seip (born 1937), Norwegian chemist
- Hans Martin Sutermeister (1907–1977), Swiss physician and medical writer, politician, and activist (pen name Hans Moehrlen)
- Hans-Martin Tillack, (born 1961), German reporter
- Hans-Martin Trepp (1922–1970), Swiss ice hockey player

== Other uses ==
- Hans-Martin Nunatak, an isolated nunatak in Queen Maud Land, Antarctica
