= Den stora dagen (disambiguation) =

Den stora dagen may refer to:

- A song, see Den stora dagen
- Another name of Vikingarna's 1982 album Kramgoa låtar 10
- 2006 Mats Bergmans album, see Den stora dagen (Mats Bergmans album)
