= Är du min älskling än? =

Song by Janne Önnered

from the album Kärlekens hus
- Language: Swedish
- Released: 1977
- Genre: Dansband music
- Label: Frituna
- Songwriter: Rune Wallebom
- Composer: Rune Wallebom

"Är du min älskling än?" is a song written by Rune Wallebom and originally recorded by Janne Önnerud for the 1977 album Kärlekens hus. He also scored a Svensktoppen hit with the song from the period of 22 May-14 August 1977.

The song's lyrics depict a former prison inmate being released, and now wondering if his partner is still by his side.

The song was also recorded by Vikingarna on the album Kramgoa låtar 5 in 1977., in 2002 by Matz Bladhs and in 2006 by Tommys on the album En dag i taget and by Mats Bergmans on the 2006 album Den stora dagen.
