= Qvigstad =

Qvigstad is a surname. Notable people with the surname include:

- Just Knud Qvigstad (1853–1957), Norwegian philologist, linguist, ethnographer, historian, and cultural historian
- Just Knut Qvigstad (1902–2001), Norwegian engineer
- Lasse Qvigstad (born 1946), Norwegian jurist
