= I kväll jag tänder ett ljus =

Single by Lennart Duvsjö
- A-side: "I kväll jag tänder ett ljus"
- B-side: "Tankar i juletid"
- Released: 1975
- Genre: schlager
- Label: Philips
- Songwriter: Ingvar Hellberg

"I kväll jag tänder ett ljus" is a Christmas song with lyrics and music by Ingvar Hellberg. With lyrics referring to childhood, it references snowy Christmases, probably on the Earth's Northern Hemisphere. It also uses some older Swedish grammar, with the lines och nu när snöflingor falla i julnatten lång.

In 1975 the song was recorded by Lennart Duvsjö, who released it as a single with "Tankar i julekväll" as B-side. Vikingarna recorded the song for the 1979 album "Vikingarnas julparty", and the 1985 Vikingarna Christmas album "Julens sånger" 1985. In 1981 Stefan Borsch recorded the song on his Christmas album "I kväll jag tänder ett ljus". The same year the song was also recorded by Lasse Stefanz. Even Göran Lindberg, on the 1995 album Sånger i jul, and och Anna-Lena Löfgren at Julens favoriter; Julens schlager from the same year have recorded the song. In 2011, Tony Strandberg and Strandbergz Orkester recorded the song.

During the period 13 December 1987-31 January 1988 Kikki Danielsson scored a Svensktoppen hit with the song, topping the chart on 20 December 1987. Her recording was also included on her 1987 Christmas album "Min barndoms jular".

In the year 2000 the song was recorded by Christer Sjögren on his Christmas album Ett julkort från förr.
