= Seib =

Seib is a surname. Notable people with the surname include:

- Ian Seib (born 1946), Australian cricket player
- Jacob Seib (1812–1883), German photographer
- Marion Seib (born 1954), German politician
- Philip Seib, American journalist and professor
- Rod Seib (born 1975), Australian rugby coach
- Wilhelm Seib (1854–1924), Austrian sculptor

== See also ==
- Seip
- Seipp
