= Jens Arup Seip =

Norwegian historian (1905–1992)

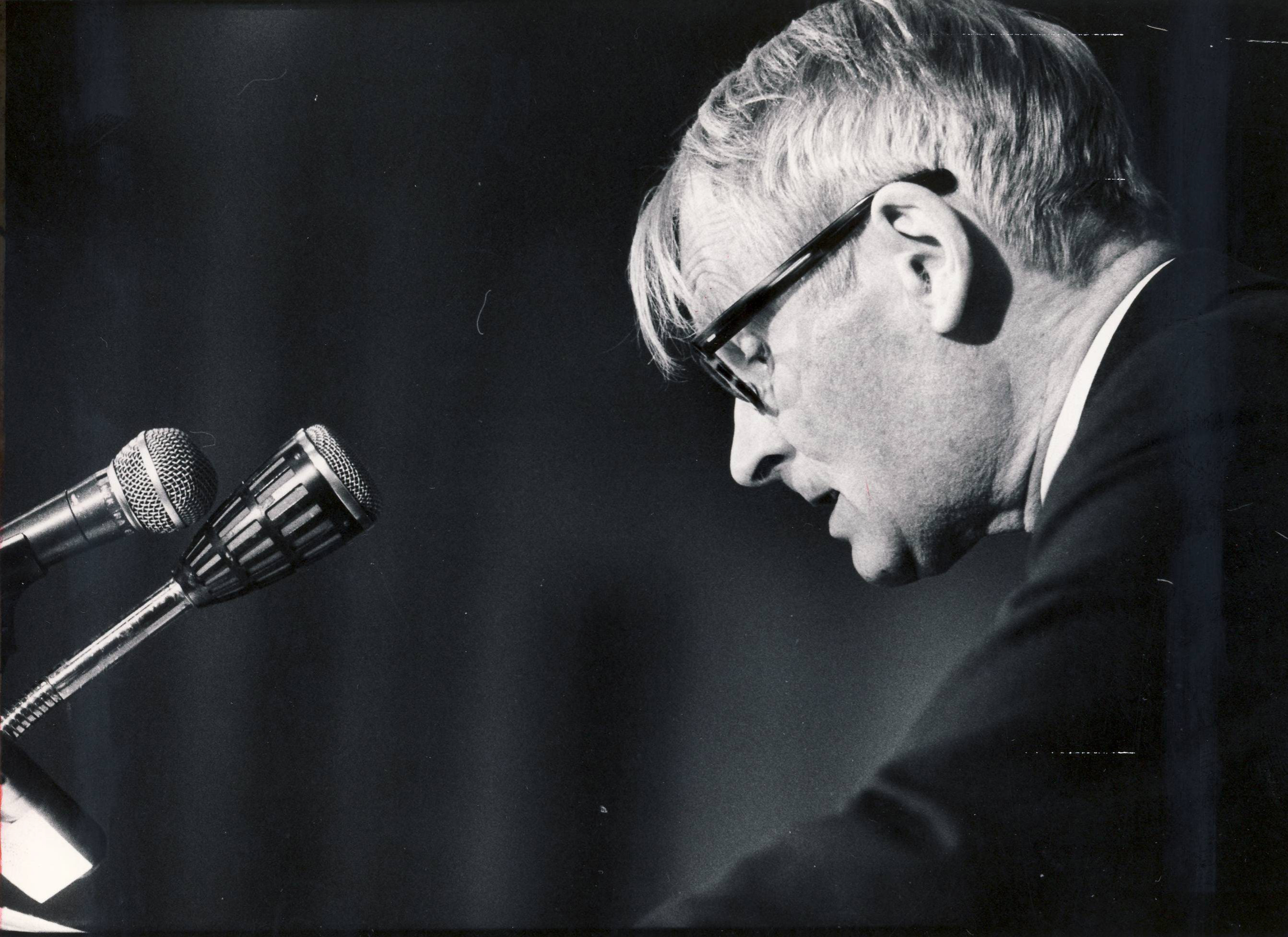
- Born: 11 October 1905; Bolsøy Municipality, Norway
- Died: 5 September 1992 (aged 86); Bærum Municipality, Norway
- Citizenship: Norwegian
- Scientific career
- Fields: medieval history political history history of ideas
- Institutions: University of Oslo lecturer 1946–1952 professor 1952–1975
- Notable students: Anne-Lise Seip, his later wife

Jens Lauritz Arup Seip (11 October 1905 – 5 September 1992) was a Norwegian historian originally trained as a medieval historian, but stood out as the strongest of his time in interpreting Norwegian political history in the 1800s, particularly known for having created the term "embedsmannsstaten". He was a professor at the University of Oslo from 1952 to 1975, specializing in political history and the history of ideas. He was married to fellow historian Anne-Lise Seip. Seip's use of the Norwegian language and his writing style which numerous historians have described as brilliant, and often tried emulating. Seip was included among the 16 authors of " The Norwegian literary canon" from 1900 to 1960 and 2nd among 20 authors in a ranking of nonfiction writers conducted by Dagbladet in 2008. Seip received an honorary doctorate at the University of Bergen from 1975.

== Personal life ==
Jens Arup Seip was born in Bolsøy Municipality, near Molde. He was a descendant of military officer and politician Andreas Martin Seip (1790–1850). Andreas' grandson Jens Laurits Arup Seip, brother of politician Karl Seip, was the father of academic Didrik Arup Seip and politician Hans Kristian Seip, the latter being the father of Jens Arup Seip. Jens Arup Seip was also a first cousin of the forester and state secretary Hans Kristian Seip, and a second cousin of politician Helge Seip and physician Martin Fredrik Seip, who were grandnephews of Jens' grandfather Jens Laurits.

Jens Arup Seip was married to teacher and painter Rachel Lehre Seip (1931–1960) and had three children, Hans Christian, Morten and Knut, then to historian Anne-Lise Seip, whom he met while she was a student at the University of Oslo. The couple lived at Høvik in Bærum Municipality, and had two children, Ingebjørg and Åsmund, both of whom are academics. He died in September 1992 in Bærum Municipality.

== Career ==
He graduated as cand.philol. in 1931. He worked as a research fellow at the University of Oslo from 1936, under the tutorship of Edvard Bull, and became known for the journal article Problemer og metode i norsk middelalderforskning in 1940. He then worked for the National Archival Services of Norway from 1941. The same year his uncle Didrik Arup Seip was removed by the Nazi occupants from his position as rector. Jens Arup Seip completed his thesis Sættargjerden i Tunsberg og kirkens jurisdiksjon in 1942, but did not receive the dr.philos. degree until 1945. He worked as a lecturer in history from 1946, and was also a consultant at the Norwegian Nobel Institute from 1946 to 1958. From 1955 to 1966 he chaired the Norwegian Historical Association.

In 1952 he was promoted to the position of professor. In addition, he drifted from his former specialty in medieval history to political history and the history of ideas. Among his most important publications were Fra embedsmannsstat til ettpartistat (1963) and Utsikt over Norges historie in two volumes (1974 and 1981). He retired from the position as professor in 1975, incidentally the same year that his wife was appointed to the Institute of History. Many of his terms have entered the Norwegian historio-political lexicon.
