= Hans Kristian Seip =

Norwegian politician

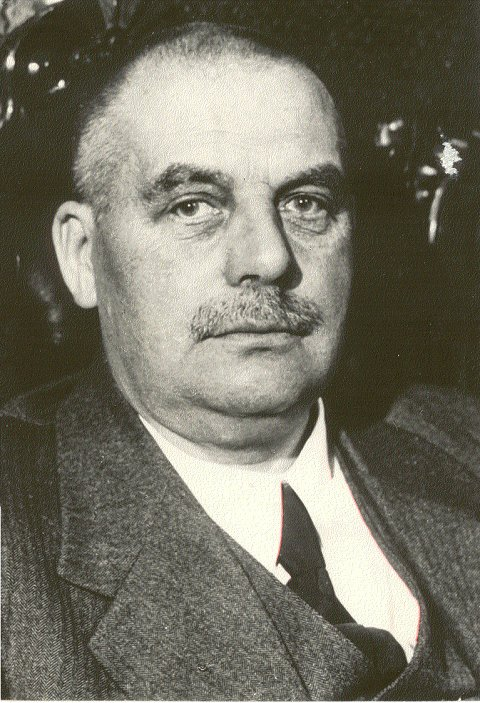
- Hans Kristian Seip

County Governor of Sogn og Fjordane
- In office 1929–1941

Member of Parliament
- In office 1934–1945 (1940-1945: Norway occupied by Germany)

Personal details
- Born: 6 November 1881 Røyken
- Died: 25 March 1945 (aged 63)
- Party: Liberal
- Relations: Andreas Martin Seip (great-grandfather); Didrik Arup Seip (brother); Karl Seip (uncle); Hans Kristian Seip (nephew)
- Children: Jens Arup Seip
- Occupation: Road engineer

Hans Kristian Seip (6 November 1881 - 25 March 1945) was a Norwegian road engineer and politician for the Liberal Party. He spent most of his professional career in the Norwegian Public Roads Administration. As a politician he was Mayor of Bergen and County Governor of Sogn og Fjordane, and served two terms in the Norwegian Parliament. He is also known as the father of political scientist Jens Arup Seip.

== Personal life ==
He was born in Røyken as the son of priest Jens Laurits Arup Seip (1852–1913) and Marie Fredrikke Aubert (1853–1931), He was the brother of academic Didrik Arup Seip, nephew of educator and politician Karl Seip, and great-grandson of military officer and politician Andreas Martin Seip.

Hans Kristian was the father of political scientist Jens Arup Seip and thus father-in-law of historian Anne-Lise Seip. He was also the uncle of forester Hans Kristian Seip.

== Career ==
Hans Kristian Seip graduated from the technical school in Kristiania in 1900, and after working for the Norwegian Public Roads Administration for two years he studied one year at Zürich Polytechnikum. He then returned to Norway to work for the Norwegian Public Roads Administration in Møre from 1903 to 1909, Hordaland from 1909 to 1915 and as engineer in Bergen from 1915 to 1921. From 1921 to 1929 he was the director of roads in Bergen county.

Seip was elected to Bergen city council in 1913. He was re-elected several times, and served until 1928; from 1922 to 1924 he served as mayor. He represented the small Prohibition Party. He was also a deputy representative to the Norwegian Parliament during the terms 1925-1927 and 1928–1930, but represented the Liberal Party on the national level.

On 2 November 1929 Seip was appointed County Governor of Sogn og Fjordane. While stationed here he was elected to the Norwegian Parliament twice; in 1934 and 1937. The scheduled election in 1940, however, was not held due to the German invasion of Norway in April 1940 and subsequent occupation. In 1941 Seip was removed from the position as County Governor. He retired to Fjærland, and worked on the history of Sogn og Fjordane County Municipality. He died in March 1945, a month and a half before the liberation of Norway.

Political offices
Preceded by Henrik Ameln	Mayor of Bergen; 1922-1924	Succeeded by Julius M. Nilssen
Preceded by Ingolf Elster Christensen	County Governor of Sogn og Fjordane; 1929–1941	Succeeded by Vidar Atne; Acting governor for WWII occupied government
