= Till mitt eget Blue Hawaii =

Single by Vikingarna

from the album Kramgoa låtar 18
- A-side: "Till mitt eget Blue Hawaii"
- B-side: "Crying in the Chapel" (with "The Jordanaires")
- Released: 1989
- Recorded: 1989
- Genre: dansband music
- Label: NMG
- Songwriter: Rose-Marie Stråhle

Vikingarna singles chronology
"En vissnad blomma"/" Hasta Mañana" (1989)	"Till mitt eget Blue Hawaii" (1989)	"Höga berg, djupa hav"/"Glöm inte bort varann" (1991)

"Till mitt eget Blue Hawaii" is a song written by Rose-Marie Stråhle, and recorded by Vikingarna on the 1990 album "Kramgoa låtar 18". With lyrics about Hawaii, it became a major Svensktoppen hit, staying at the chart for 23 weeks during the period 7 January-13 May 1990, and was atop of the chart for the first nine weeks. In October 1989, the song won "Hänts meloditävling".

== Other recordings ==
- A 1995 heavy metal version by Black-Ingvars, was on the album "Earcandy Six" and released as a single that year. The single entered the charts, peaking at 3rd position in Sweden and 12th position in Norway.
- A recording by Östen med Resten was on the band's 2001 cover album""Originallåtar", and in 2002 served as the B-side for the single "Hon kommer med solsken".
- Bjørn Held wrote lyrics in Danish, also titled "Till mitt eget Blue Hawaii", which was recorded by Danish dansband Kandis on the 2004 album "Kandis live".
- At Dansbandskampen 2008 the song was performed by Scotts. It was also on the 2008 Scotts album På vårt sätt.
- At Dansbandskampen 2009 the song was performed by Von Hofstenz.
- During a Dansbandskampen 2010 pause act, the song was performed by Gunhild Carling.

== Charts ==
=== Black Ingvars version ===
Chart (1995)	Peak position
Norway (VG-lista)	12
Sweden (Sverigetopplistan)	3
