= Vi har så mycket att säga varandra =

"Vi har så mycket att saga varandra"

Single by Ulla Billquist & Gösta Jonsson
- A-side: "Vi har så mycket att saga varandra"
- B-side: "Mademoiselle"
- Released: June 1940
- Recorded: Stockholm, Sweden, 23 May 1940
- Genre: schlager
- Label: Sonora
- Songwriters: Jules Sylvain, Åke Söderblom

Vi har så mycket att säga varandra is a song written by, Jules Sylvain (music) and Åke Söderblom (lyrics), for the 1940 film "Kyss henne!", where it was performed by Annalisa Ericson and Åke Söderblom. The song was also recorded by Ulla Billquist & Gösta Jonsson, and became a major success that year.

The song was also recorded by Jigs in 1974 and Vikingarna in 1992. Jigs recording charted at Svensktoppen, where it stayed for eleven weeks during the period of 8 September-7 November 1974, topping the chart from the fourth to the eleventh week.

Musician Nils Dacke recorded the song on the album "Nils Dacke spelar partyorgel 3" (1975). Other recordings were done by Stig Lorentz in 1984, by Lill-Arnes in 2003, and in 2007 by Leif Hagbergs.
