= Vikingarnas julparty =

Studio album by Vikingarna
- Released: December 1979
- Genre: Christmas, dansband music
- Label: Mariann Records

Vikingarna chronology
Greatest Hits (1979)	Vikingarnas julparty (1979)	Kramgoa låtar 8 (1980)

Vikingarnas julparty is a 1979 Vikingarna studio album. The side A consists of Christmas songs.

== Track listing ==
=== Side A ===
1. I kväll jag tänder ett ljus
2. Bella Notte
3. Bjällerklang (Jingle Bells)
4. Låt mig få tända ett ljus (Mozarts vaggsång)
5. Hej, mitt vinterland
6. Ser du stjärnan i det blå (When You Wish upon a Star)
7. Sjömansjul på Hawaii
8. Jag drömmer om en jul hemma (White Christmas)

=== Side B ===
1. Hav och himmel
2. Leende guldbruna ögon (Beautiful Brown Eyes)
3. Mississippi
4. Moskva (Moskau)
5. Fernando
6. Inför prästen
7. En gång är ingen gång (Han är min sång och glädje)
8. Charlie Brown

== Charts ==
Chart (1979)	Peak position
Swedish Albums (Sverigetopplistan)	41
