= Fröken Fräken =

1964 song written by Thore Skogman

Single by Sven-Ingvars
- A-side: "Fröken Fräken"
- B-side: "Min gitarr"
- Released: 1964
- Recorded: Philips
- Genre: popular music
- Songwriter: Thore Skogman

"Fröken Fräken" is a song written by Thore Skogman and recorded by Sven-Ingvars, who released it as a single in 1964. Their version charted at Svensktoppen for six weeks between 21 November 1964 and 9 January 1965, peaking at first position.

Thore Skogman recorded the song on 10 November 1963, and released it in December 1965 on the EP featuring Pop opp i topp.

The song also became successful outside Sweden, with recordings in Danish, Finnish, Norwegian, French, English, Icelandic and Dutch, as "Sophietje", by the popular dutch artist Johnny Lion.

In 2008, the song was performed at Dansbandskampen by Scotts, who included it on their 2008 album På vårt sätt 2008.

== Charts ==
Chart (1964–1965)	Peak position
Norway (VG-lista)	1
