= Kramgoa låtar 9 =

1981 studio album by Vikingarna

Studio album by Vikingarna
- Released: March 1981
- Genre: Dansband
- Length: 41:54
- Label: Mariann
- Producer: Lars O. Carlsson

Vikingarna chronology
Kramgoa låtar 8 (1980)	Kramgoa låtar 9 (1981)	Kramgoa låtar 10 (1982)

Kramgoa låtar 9 is a 1981 Vikingarna studio album. The album was rereleased to CD in 1988. and 1996. In December 1999, Aftonbladet's Michael Nystås appointed the album the "best dansband album of the 20th century". The album is also one of the titles in the 1999 book Tusen svenska klassiker.

== Track listing ==
Side one
No.	Title	Writer(s)	Length
1.	"Hallå Västindien"	Anders Melander	3:35
2.	"Jag ger dig min morgon"	Tom Paxton; Fred Åkerström	2:25
3.	"En fin gammal sång"	Wayland Holyfield; Monica Forsberg	2:40
4.	"Brusa högre lilla å"	Björn J:son Lindh	3:41
5.	"Hälften så kär"	Curley Williams; Sven-Olof Sandberg	2:39
6.	"Det är du min vän"	Tommy Cash; Bengt Sundström	2:14
7.	"Sänd inga rosor"	Acke Svensson; Ebbe Nilsson	3:18
Total length:			20:32

Side two
No.	Title	Writer(s)	Length
1.	"Hallå go'morron"	Nick MacKenzie; Tord Sjöman	3:10
2.	"Santa Maria"	Cesare De Natale; Guido De Angelis; Maurizio De Angelis; Phaedra	3:51
3.	"Det är en sång till dej"	Conway Twitty; Jack Nance; Forsberg	2:31
4.	"Sheriffens sång"	Harald Rydén; Tryggve Arnesson	2:40
5.	"My Way"	Jacques Revaux; Claude François; Paul Anka	4:03
6.	"Home on the Ranch"	Lars O. Carlsson	2:33
7.	"Finns det någon som förstår"	Bill Trader; Mats Rådberg	2:34
Total length:			21:22

== Charts ==
Chart (1981)	Peak position
Swedish Albums (Sverigetopplistan)	5
