= Tiotusen röda rosor =

Single by Jan Høiland
- A-side: "Tiotusen röda rosor"
- B-side: "Vid vindarnas boning"
- Released: 1967
- Genre: schlager
- Label: Polydor
- Songwriter: Thore Skogman
- Producer: Marcus Österdahl

"Tiotusen röda rosor" is a song written by Thore Skogman. Recorded by Jan Høiland, it was released as a 1967 single (Polydor NH59747), and became a Svensktoppen hit charting for six weeks between 17 March-21 April 1968, which included the song topping the chart.

The song has also been recorded by dansbands like Curt Haagers (on 1983 album Guld och gröna skogar). and Vikingarna (1988, acting as a B-side for the single Tredje gången gillt)

In 1995, a heavy metal version was recorded by Black-Ingvars on the album "Earcandy Six".

At Dansbandskampen 2008 the song was performed by Kindbergs. However, not live over the SVT broadcasting, as the band had been knocked out at the previous moment "Dansbandsklassikern". Instead, their version was recorded at Aftonbladet's official album Dansafton, released in February 2009, consisting of music from Dansbandskampen 2008.

In 2010, Anne-Lie Rydé recorded the song on the album Dans på rosor.
