= På vårt sätt (Scotts album) =

Studio album by Scotts
- Released: December 19, 2008
- Recorded: Sing2music Studio, Lidköping, Sweden
- Genre: modern dansband music, dansband pop
- Label: Mariann
- Producer: Roberto Mårdstam, Claes Linder

Scotts chronology
På vårt sätt (2008)	Upp till dans (2009)

På vårt sätt is a studio album from Scotts, released on 19 December 2008. The album topped the Swedish albums chart between 2 and 23 January 2009. The album featured the single "Om igen", peaking at number 27 on the Swedish Singles Chart and also charting at Svensktoppen. The other recordings were cover versions, many of them of songs performed by Scotts during Dansbandskampen 2008.

== Track listing ==
#	Title	Writer	Length
1.	"Fröken Fräken"	Thore Skogman	3.05
2.	"Om igen"	Jonas Dejevik	3.06
3.	"Right Here Waiting"	Richard Marx	4.15
4.	"Det börjar verka kärlek banne mej"	Peter Himmelstrand	3.12
5.	"Två mörka ögon"	Bert Månsson	3.45
6.	"En blick, en dans, en kyss" ("One Dance, One Rose, One Kiss")	Joakim Anrell, Ulf Georgsson	3.44
7.	"Sarah"	Mauro Scocco	4.42
8.	"It Must Have Been Love"	Per Gessle	3.45
9.	"Till mitt eget Blue Hawaii"	Rose-Marie Stråhle	2.56
10.	"Tusen bitar" ("Tusind stykker")	Björn Afzelius, Anne Linnet	3.48
11.	"Hallå du gamle indian"	Lars Erik Dahlqvist	3.16

== Personnel ==
- Henrik Strömberg – vocals, guitar
- Claes Linder – keyboards
- Roberto Mårdstam – bass
- Per-Erik "Lillen" Tagesson – drums
- Sax: Martin Lindqvist
- Trumpet: Ingmar Andersson

== Charts ==
Chart (2008–2009)	Peak position
Norwegian Albums (VG-lista)	15
Swedish Albums (Sverigetopplistan)	1
