= Jan Høiland =

Norwegian singer

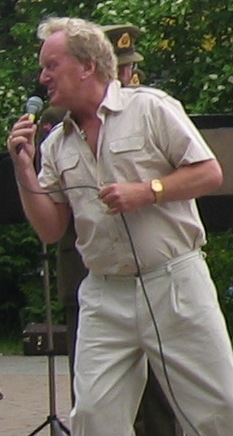
- Jan Høiland performs at the 2007 Festival of North Norway

Background information
- Born: 6 February 1939; Stavanger, Norway
- Died: 7 June 2017 (aged 78) Sweden
- Genres: popular music, schlager
- Occupation: Singer
- Years active: 1957-2017

Jan Høiland (6 February 1939, Stavanger, Norway – 7 June 2017, Sweden) was a Norwegian singer, who lived for many years in Harstad. The song "Tiotusen röda rosor" by Thore Skogman was Høiland's biggest hit. He scored several chart successes in Norway.

Accompanied by Finn Våland on piano, he made his debut at Cafe Inger in Stavanger in 1957, followed by his record debut "Det vil komme av seg selv"/"Dormi-dormi-dormi" (1958), on Columbia.
