= Den stora dagen =

Song by Jigs

from the album Goa bitar 7
- Language: Swedish
- Released: 1978
- Genre: dansband music
- Label: Mariann
- Songwriter: Benny Borg

"Den stora dagen" is a song written by Benny Borg and originally recorded by Swedish dansband Jigs on the 1978 album Goa bitar 7. In 1982 Vikingarna recorded the song on the album "Kramgoa låtar 10", sometimes also called "Den stora dagen". Their recording became a Svensktoppen hit, staying at the chart for 10 weeks between 14 March-16 May 1982, peaking at second place. Vikingarna also re-recorded the song in 1996.

In 2006, Mats Bergmans recorded the song for the album Den stora dagen.

At Dansbandskampen 2008, Face-84 performed the song. However, not live over Sveriges Television because the band was knocked out in the previous moment momentet "Dansbandsklassikern". However, their recording is at Aftonbladet's official compilation album Dansafton in February 2009, with music from Dansbandskampen.

The song lyrics are story-telling, with a society-related theme about how older people are often forgotten.

The song was performed by Robert Gustafsson and Åsa Fång in the TV program Så ska det låta at Sveriges Television, airing on 14 March 2008.

Linnea Henriksson performed the song at Så mycket bättre 2018.

== Chart positions ==
=== Linnea Henriksson ===
Chart (2018)	Peak position
Sweden (Sverigetopplistan)	76
