= Änglahund =

Song by Hasse Andersson
- Language: Swedish
- Released: 1982
- Genre: country
- Label: Sonet
- Songwriter: Hasse Andersson

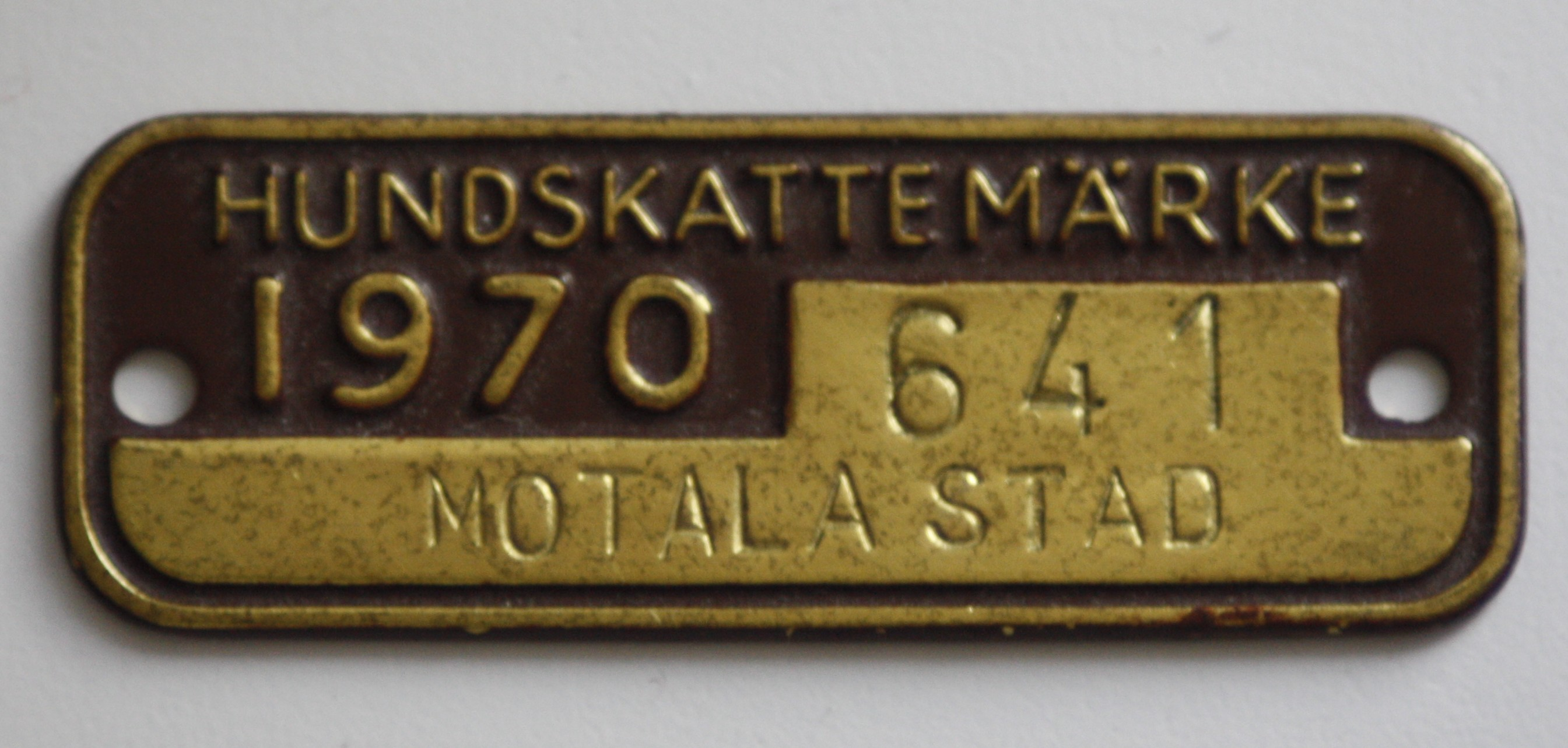
Song lyrics reflect a time when dog licence was used in Sweden.

Änglahund is a song written by Hasse Andersson, and recorded on his 1982 album with the same name. The song's lyrics asks the question if God allows people bringing their dog into Heaven after death. The song has also been recorded with lyrics in English, as Angel Buddy.

The song was also dealt with during a meeting of bishops, where Christian leaders wondered how a non-religious song about the afterlife could make thousands of people listen, while priests in church had problems getting visitors despite dealing with the same issue.

Song lyrics reflect a time when dog licence was used in Sweden.

== Other recordings ==
- Vikingarna recorded the song in 1983 on the album "Kramgoa låtar 11". Their recording of the song also appears in the 2014 film The Anderssons Rock the Mountains, in a rather humorous way, by being played on the radio after the family worry about a dog that the main character, Sune, feels bad about having hit with a soccer ball.
- Swedish rock band Kenneth & the Knutters recorded the song as "Änglabåge", replacing the dog theme with the motorcycle.
- Swedish musician and preacher Målle Lindberg also recorded the song.
- Swedish rock band Mustasch released a cover of the song in 2017. Later the same year they released the English-language song "Hounds from Hell" with the same instrumentals.

== In other languages ==
A Danish-language-version, Himmelhunden, was written by Calle Sand and became the 1984 breakthrough song for Teddy Edelmann.
