= Bella Notte =

US 1955 song

Song by George Givot
- Released: 1955
- Genre: Italian-style pop
- Label: Walt Disney
- Composer: Sonny Burke
- Lyricist: Peggy Lee

"Bella Notte" (Italian for "Beautiful Night") is a romantic song for the 1955 animated motion picture Lady and the Tramp from Walt Disney Productions. The music was composed by Sonny Burke and the lyrics were written by Peggy Lee. The song was performed in the film by George Givot, who also provided the voice of Tony. It is sung onscreen during the falling in love over a shared plate of spaghetti sequence.

Peggy Lee recorded the song for herself for a 1955 Decca release with a choir and orchestra led by Victor Young. The song has also been recorded for a Disneyland album, sung by Bob Grabeau.

Ronnie Hilton recorded the song, and Siw Malmkvist recorded the song in Swedish, releasing it on a record in February 1956. The song has also been recorded by Vikingarna on the 1979 album Vikingarnas julparty and Christer Sjögren himself on the 1994 Christmas album När ljusen ska tändas därhemma.

Mark Salling, Kevin McHale, and Chord Overstreet recorded the song, and performed it on twenty-second episode and season two finale of Glee on May 24, 2011.
