= Kramgoa låtar 14 =

Studio album by Vikingarna
- Released: February 1986
- Genre: dansband music
- Length: circa 43 minutes
- Label: Mariann Records

Vikingarna chronology
Julens sånger (1985)	Kramgoa låtar 14 (1986)	Kramgoa låtar 15 (1987)

Kramgoa låtar 14 is a 1986 Vikingarna studio album.

== Track listing ==
=== Side A ===
1. Ljus och värme (Lys og varme) - 3.37 (Å.Alexandersen-B.Borg)
2. Oki Doki - 2.34 (J.Kennedy-E&A.Ljusberg)
3. I dina kvarter - 3.57 (F.Loewe-G.Rybrant)
4. Lilla vän (Wooden Heart) - 2.13 (Trad.arr: L.O.Carlsson/M.Forsberg)
5. Säj du, säj jag (Say You, Say Me) - 3.50 (L.Richie-M.Borgström)
6. Drömmar av silver (Beautiful Dreamer) - 2.48 (Trad.arr: L.O.Carlsson-H.Iseborg)
7. Följ mä ôss te Värmeland - 2.44 (G.Brown-Alfson)

=== Side B ===
1. Nikita - 3.56 (E.John-Taupin-T.Hagman)
2. Midnatt - 3.10 (M.Contra-K.Almgren/ILO)
3. Huller om buller - 3.05 (J.Blomqvist-L.Berghagen)
4. Käre John (instrumental) - 2.36 (L.Talley-S.Owens)
5. Livets gång (Walk of Life) - 3.02 (M.Knopfler-M.Borgström)
6. Får jag lov - 2.35 (L.Olsson-M.Forsberg)
7. When You're Smiling - 2.30 (J.Goodwin-L.Shay)

== Contributors ==
- Choir - Liza Öhman, Lotta Pedersen, Lasse Westmann
- Guitar - Hasse Rosén
- Steelguitar - Janne Lundgren
- Synthesizer - Peter Ljung
- Strings - Swedish Radio Symphony Orchestra

== Charts ==
Chart (1986)	Peak position
Norwegian Albums (VG-lista)	19
Swedish Albums (Sverigetopplistan)	8
