= Det brinner ett ljus =

Song by Stefan Borsch

from the album "I kväll jag tänder ett ljus"
- Language: Swedish
- Released: 1981
- Genre: Christmas, dansband, schlager
- Label: Mariann Records
- Composer: Kerstin Andeby
- Lyricist: Monica Forsberg

Det brinner ett ljus or Det brinner ett ljus för en gammal sång is a Christmas song with lyrics written by Monica Forsberg, and music by Kerstin Andeby. The song describes Christmas both during the birth of Jesus, and today. The song was recorded by Stefan Borsch in 1981.

The song has also been recorded by Christer Sjögren together with a children's choir, Hasse Andersson, Sten & Stanley and Ritz.

In 2005 the song was recorded by Kerstin Andebys barnkör & Peter Wanngrens orkester on the album Julskivan.
