= Kramgoa låtar 11 =

Studio album by Vikingarna
- Released: March 1983
- Genre: dansband music
- Length: circa 45 minutes
- Label: Mariann Records

Vikingarna chronology
Kramgoa låtar 10 (1982)	Kramgoa låtar 11 (1983)	Kramgoa låtar 12 (1984)

Kramgoa låtar 11 is a 1983 Vikingarna studio album which was rereleased to CD in 1988 and 1992.

== Track listing ==
=== Side A ===
1. Liljor (Give Me Flowers While I'm Living)
2. Med vinden kom en sång
3. Ord (Words)
4. La Paloma
5. Sista dansen
6. Klockornas sång
7. Memory (instrumental)

=== Side B ===
1. Änglahund
2. Save Your Love
3. Marie Marie
4. Leka med elden (Ginny Come Lately)
5. Indian Love Call (instrumental)
6. Det här är bara början
7. En sång till alla människor

== Charts ==
Chart (1983–1984)	Peak position
Norwegian Albums (VG-lista)	11
Swedish Albums (Sverigetopplistan)	6
