= Kramgoa låtar 12 =

Studio album by Vikingarna
- Released: February 1984
- Genre: dansband music
- Length: circa 45 minutes
- Label: Mariann Records

Vikingarna chronology
Kramgoa låtar 11 (1983)	Kramgoa låtar 12 (1984)	Kramgoa låtar 13 (1985)

Kramgoa låtar 12 is a 1984 Vikingarna studio album. The album was rereleased to CD in 1988 and 1992.

== Track listing ==
=== Side 1 ===
1. Albatross
2. Så vi möts igen
3. Där rosor aldrig dör
4. Minns du de orden
5. Danny Boy (instrumental)
6. Vi måste ses igen
7. Nu är det bara du och jag

=== Side 2 ===
1. Röda rosor, röda läppar
2. Elvis-Medley
3. Kärleken är som den är
4. Skänk en blomma
5. Raring (Honey)
6. Borta bra, men hemma bäst

== Charts ==
Chart (1984)	Peak position
Swedish Albums (Sverigetopplistan)	8
