= Julens sånger =

Studio album by Vikingarna
- Released: December 1985
- Genre: Christmas, modern dansband music
- Label: Mariann

Vikingarna chronology
Kramgoa låtar 13 (1985)	Julens sånger (1985)	Kramgoa låtar 14 (1986)

Julens sånger is a 1985 Vikingarna Christmas album, recorded together with a children's choir.

== Track listing ==
=== Side A ===
1. Nu tändas tusen juleljus
2. Jul, jul, strålande jul
3. Gläns över sjö och strand
4. White Christmas
5. Låt mig få tända ett ljus (Mozart's lullaby)
6. O Holy Night (Cantique de noël)

=== Side B ===
1. Stilla natt (Stille Nacht, heilige Nacht)
2. I kväll jag tänder ett ljus
3. När juldagsmorgon glimmar
4. När det lider mot jul (Det strålar en stjärna)
5. Bereden väg för Herran
6. Julen är här igen

== Charts ==
Chart (1986)	Peak position
Sweden (Sverigetopplistan)	41
