= Hallå Västindien =

1980 Felix song

Song by Vikingarna

from the album "Kramgoa låtar 9"
- Language: Swedish
- Released: 1981
- Genre: dansband music
- Label: Mariann
- Songwriter: Anders Melander
- Composer: Anders Melander

Hallå Västindien is a song written by Anders Melander, originally intended to be a dansband parody song for the TV series Lycka till in 1980. Recorded by Felix, it acted as a B-side for the single Tomorrow.

A Vikingarna recording on the 1981 album Kramgoa låtar 9. became one of the band's most successful hit songs ever. In 1981 the song was also recorded by Curt Haagers and released as a single.

The song was also performed by Date during Dansbandskampen 2008. However, not during the Sveriges Television live-broadcastings, but at the official compilation album of Dansbandskamepen that year.
