= Kramgoa låtar 8 =

Studio album by Vikingarna
- Released: June 1980
- Genre: dansband music
- Length: circa 51 minutes
- Label: Mariann Records

Vikingarna chronology
Vikingarnas julparty (1979)	Kramgoa låtar 8 (1980)	Kramgoa låtar 9 (1981)

Kramgoa låtar 8 is a 1980 Vikingarna studio album. The album was released in two versions. The album was rereleased to CD in 1996.

== Track listing (1980 version) ==
=== Side 1 ===
1. Vad gör än ett år (What's Another Year)
2. Natt och dag
3. He'll have to go
4. Ge mig en sommar
5. Love letters in the sand
6. Varför är solen så röd
7. Vi får hoppas att allting går bra
8. Jag möter dig

=== Side 2 ===
1. Låt dagen bli lång
2. Maria Maruschka
3. Rambling rose
4. Lever i en drömvärld
5. Release me
6. Moskva
7. Krama mej
8. Brutna löften

== Track listing (1996 version) ==
=== Side 1 ===
1. Mot alla vindar
2. Sun of Jamaica
3. Vad gör än ett år (What's another year)
4. Natt och dag
5. He'll have to go
6. Love letters in the sand
7. Varför är solen så röd
8. Vi får hoppas att allting går bra
9. Jag möter dig

=== Side 2 ===
1. Låt dagen bli lång
2. Maria Maruschka
3. Rambling rose
4. Lever i en drömvärld
5. Release me
6. Moskva
7. Krama mej
8. Brutna löften

== Charts ==
Chart (1980)	Peak position
Norwegian Albums (VG-lista)	18
Swedish Albums (Sverigetopplistan)	4
