= One Dance, One Rose, One Kiss =

Single by Refreshments
- A-side: "One Dance, One Rose, One Kiss"
- B-side: "Modern Man"
- Released: 2001
- Label: Independent
- Songwriter(s): Joakim Anrell

One Dance, One Rose, One Kiss is a song written by Joakim Anrell, and originally recorded by the Refreshments on the 2001 album Real Songs on Real Instruments. as well as releasing it as a single the same year.

During the Kikki, Bettan & Lotta tours, the song was also performed, and a live version performed by Bettan and Lotta in 2002 appeared on the 2003 Kikki, Bettan & Lotta compilation album Live från Rondo.

Swedish dansband Donnez recorded the song on the 2004 album Se vår värld.

Ulf Georgsson wrote a Swedish-language lyrics-version, named En blick, en dans, en kyss, which was recorded by Scotts releasing it as 2001 single at the Mariann Grammofon label "Det bästa för mig" acting as a B-side. The Scotts recording charted at Svensktoppen for nine weeks between 8 September-3 November 2001, peaking at fourth position. As recorded by Scotts, the song also appeared on the 2008 album På vårt sätt.
