= Dunja, du =

Song by Wolfgang Roloff
- Language: German
- Released: 1966
- Genre: schlager
- Songwriters: Wolfgang Roloff, Hans Hee

"Dunja, du" is originally a West German schlager song, written by Wolfgang Roloff and Hans Hee. In 1966, it was recorded by Ronny (Wolfgang Roloff)

Keld Heick wrote a Danish text entitled "Vi ska' gå hånd i hånd" which became popular in Denmark in 1968. Keld Heick recorded the song with his group Keld & The Donkeys.

Bengt Sundström translated the Danish text into Swedish as "Vi ska gå hand i hand", copyright credited 1966. With these lyrics, Gunnar Wiklund recorded the song, releasing it as a single in 1967 with "Jag ser en värld" acting as B-side. His version became a major Svensktoppen hit for 20 weeks between 14 April-25 August 1968, topping the chart for four weeks.

With these lyrics, the song was also recorded by Vikingarna on the 1999 album Kramgoa låtar 1999.

The piece as translated by Pertti Reponen and recorded by Tapani Kansa with the name "Käymme yhdessä ain" was one of the most popular songs in Finland in the sixties.
