= Kramgoa låtar 20 =

Studio album by Vikingarna
- Released: May 1992
- Genre: Dansband music
- Length: circa 42 minutes
- Label: NMG

Vikingarna chronology
Gitarrgodingar (1991)	Kramgoa låtar 20 (1992)	Vikingarna Gold (1993)

Kramgoa låtar 20 is a 1992 studio album by Vikingarna.

== Track listing ==
1. Hem igen
2. För dina blåa ögons skull
3. But I Do
4. Kommer du till sommaren
5. En natt i Moskva
6. Teddy Bear
7. Du är min sommar, Marie
8. Vi har så mycket att säga varandra
9. Mona-Lisa
10. Jag tror på lyckan
11. Angelina min vän
12. Det är en viking
13. Jag vill älska
14. Varje brev
15. Are You Lonesome Tonight?

== Charts ==
Chart (1992)	Peak position
Sweden (Sverigetopplistan)	15
