= Kan man älska nå'n på avstånd? =

Song by Vikingarna

from the album "Kramgoa låtar 1998"
- Language: Swedish
- Released: 19 October 1998
- Genre: dansband music
- Label: EMI
- Songwriter: Tommy Andersson
- Composer: Anders Melander

"Kan man älska nå'n på avstånd?" is a song written by Karin Hemmingsson and Tommy Andersson, and recorded by Swedish dansband Vikingarna on the band's album Kramgoa låtar 1998 from the within the album title mentioned year. The song was originally played at Ragnar Dahlberg's TV program På turné on 1 July 1998. Vikingarna also performed the song at Leif "Loket" Olsson's TV program Bingolotto on 24 October the same year.

The song lyrics deals with loving someone at a long distance, between two places where a car travel lasts several hours.

== Charts ==
Kan man älska nå'n på avstånd? peaked at 35th place at the Swedish single chart. The song was at Svensktoppen during the years of 1998 and 1999, peaking during the 25 first times. On 8 August 1998 the song, debuting, directly topped the chart. On 30 January 1999 the song had been kicked down to the second place. On 24 April 1999, the song had been knocked out from the chart.

== Other recordings ==
- Vikingarna also recorded the song with lyrics in German, as "Kuschel dich in meine Arme".
- At Så mycket bättre 2018, the song was performed by Albin Lee Meldau, accompanied by the guitar played by himself.

== Charts ==
=== Vikingarna ===
Chart (1998)	Peak position
Sweden (Sverigetopplistan)	35

=== Albin Lee Meldau ===
Chart (1998)	Peak position
Sweden (Sverigetopplistan)	86
