= Kramgoa låtar 13 =

Studio album by Vikingarna
- Released: March 1985
- Genre: dansband music
- Length: circa 45 minutes
- Label: KM

Vikingarna chronology
Kramgoa låtar 12 (1984)	Kramgoa låtar 13 (1985)	Julens sånger (1985)

Kramgoa låtar 13 is a 1985 Vikingarna studio album. The album was rereleased to CD in 1988 and 1992.

== Track listing ==
1. Millioner röda rosor
2. Aloha Oe Aloha Oe
3. Pendlaren Putte
4. Vår egen melodi
5. I Know Why Sun Valley Serenade
6. Näckens dotter
7. Så förlåt lilla vän
8. Siluetter Papirsklip
9. Äntligen är vi tillsammans
10. Flyg fri
11. Ole Lukkeøye
12. Himlen den får vänta än
13. Störst av allt är kärleken
14. Som en sommarvind

== Charts ==
Chart (1985)	Peak position
Swedish Albums (Sverigetopplistan)	12
