= Seip mountain =

Mountain in Svalbard, Norway

Coordinates: 77°55′30″N 14°08′30″E

Seip mountain or Seipefjellet (in Norwegian) in Svalbard is a mountain with the peaks 720 and 710 masl, between Orustdalen, Vestre Grønnfjordbreen and Dahlfonna, west in Nordenskiöld Land. Ascended by A. Koller and assistants of the Hoel and Staxrud expedition, on July 16, 1911, for geographical surveying. Named after Karl Seip, 1850–1909, Norwegian clergyman, educationalist and politician, minister for church affairs and education 1908–09, in which capacity he proposed a government grant for Isachsen's Spitsbergen expedition 1909-10
