= I kväll jag tänder ett ljus (album) =

Studio album by Stefan Borsch
- Released: 1981
- Genre: Christmas
- Label: Mariann Records

Stefan Borsch chronology
Minns att jag finns (1981)	I kväll jag tänder ett ljus (1981)	En liten fågel (1982)

I kväll jag tänder ett ljus is a 1981 Stefan Borsch Christmas album, recorded by him together with among others the Swedish Radio Symphony Orchestra. In 1992, the album was re-released on CD.

== Track listing ==
=== Side 1 ===
1. Jag drömmer om en jul hemma (White Christmas)
2. O helga natt (Cantique de noel)
3. Det brinner ett ljus
4. Ser du stjärnan i det blå (When You Wish Upon a Star)
5. Stilla natt (Stille Nacht, heilige Nacht)
6. När det lider mot jul (Det strålar en stjärna)

=== Side 2 ===
1. I kväll jag tänder ett ljus
2. Det hände sig för länge sen (Mary's Boy Child)
3. Låt mig få tända ett ljus (Schlafe mein Prinzchen)
4. Lilla klocka ring igen (On a Snowy Christmas Night)
5. Jag ser en stjärna på himlen (It Came Upon the Midnight Clear)
6. Grå jul (Blue Christmas)
7. Vinterbild (El noye de la mare)

== Charts ==
Chart (1981)	Peak position
Sweden (Sverigetopplistan)	35
