= Den stora dagen (Mats Bergmans album) =

Studio album by Mats Bergmans
- Released: 23 August 2006
- Recorded: Sky Lark Studio, Sweden, April–June 2006
- Genre: dansband music
- Length: 42 minutes
- Label: Warner Music Sweden

Mats Bergmans chronology
Vänd dig inte om (2004)	Den stora dagen (2006)	Jubileum (2007)

Den stora dagen is a 2006 studio album by Mats Bergmans. It peaked at number eight on the Swedish Albums Chart and consists of both newly written and older songs.

The album earned a gold certification with 30,000 copies sold, just before the limit for a gold record was reduced to 20,000 and the album was awarded under the older rules.

Despite the album's success, Sveriges Radio didn't want to play the music until booker Hermansson threatened with going to the European Court of Human Rights.

== Track listing ==
1. Jag vill andas samma luft som du (covering Pierre Isacsson)
2. Kan du hålla dom orden
3. Den stora dagen (covering Vikingarna)
4. Tack och hej
5. Ain't that a Shame
6. Jag har inte tid (covering Sten & Stanley)
7. Leker med elden
8. Lilla fågel
9. Finders, Keepers, Loosers, Weepers
10. Är du min älskling än? (covering Janne Önnerud)
11. Det borde vara jag
12. När jag vaknar
13. Let Me Be There (covering John Rostill)
14. Ge mig tid

== Charts ==
=== Weekly charts ===
Chart (2006)	Peak position
Swedish Albums (Sverigetopplistan)	8

=== Year-end charts ===
Chart (2006)	Position
Swedish Albums (Sverigetopplistan)	98
