= Kramgoa låtar 19 =

Studio album by Vikingarna
- Released: April 1991
- Genre: Dansband music
- Length: circa 42 minutes
- Label: NMG

Vikingarna chronology
Kramgoa låtar 18 (1990)	Kramgoa låtar 19 (1991)	Gitarrgodingar (1991)

Kramgoa låtar 19 is a 1991 studio album by Vikingarna. For the album, the band was awarded a Grammis Award in the "Dansband of the Year" category.

== Track listing ==
1. Höga berg djupa hav
2. Don't
3. Ett fång med röda rosor
4. Om vi var tillsammans
5. Sångerna får vingar
6. Vikingafest
7. Apache (instrumental)
8. Bara för en natt
9. Hallå hallå
10. Låt vindarna bära
11. Den gamla Moraklockan
12. När jag ser dig le
13. Håll mig hårt
14. Snart så går det åter mot ljusa tider
15. Samla alla vänner
16. Den första gång jag såg dig

== Charts ==
Chart (1991)	Peak position
Norway (VG-lista)	7
Sweden (Sverigetopplistan)	15
