= Kramgoa låtar 15 =

Studio album by Vikingarna
- Released: March 1987
- Recorded: Soundtrade Studios, Solna, Sweden, December 1987-February 1987
- Genre: dansband music
- Length: circa 43 minutes
- Label: Mariann Records

Vikingarna chronology
Kramgoa låtar 14 (1987)	Kramgoa låtar 15 (1987)	Kramgoa låtar 16 (1988)

Kramgoa låtar 15 is a 1987 Vikingarna studio album. In 2003, the album was rerelased in the box set 100% guldfavoriter.

== Track listing ==
1. Aldrig aldrig mer
2. Kärleksrosen
3. Tänk när det blir sommar
4. Hallå Mary Lou hello Mary Lou
5. Roses Are Red
6. Vem
7. Love's Been Good To Me
8. En gång skall vi åter mötas
9. Du är ung du är fri
10. Det finns en glädje i musiken
11. Ljuvliga sommar
12. Den första kärleken
13. Golden Gate
14. Håll varandra hårt

== Charts ==
Chart (1987)	Peak position
Norwegian Albums (VG-lista)	12
Swedish Albums (Sverigetopplistan)	11

== Certification ==
Region	Certification	Certified units/sales
Norway (IFPI Norway)	Gold	50,000
