= Kramgoa låtar 18 =

Studio album by Vikingarna
- Released: April 1990
- Genre: Dansband music
- Length: circa 47 minutes
- Label: NMG

Vikingarna chronology
Kramgoa låtar 17 (1989)	Kramgoa låtar 18 (1990)	Kramgoa låtar 19 (1991)

Kramgoa låtar 18 is a 1990 studio album by Vikingarna.

== Track listing ==
1. Till mitt eget Blue Hawaii
2. Vägen hem
3. Rumba i Balders Hage
4. Min arm omkring din hals
5. Ett litet rosa band
6. Allt beror på dej
7. Love Me Tender
8. Gammal kärlek rostar aldrig
9. Förlora aldrig tron på kärleken
10. Minns du den sommar (Greenfields)
11. Sommardansen går
12. Du försvann som en vind
13. Wonderful Land (instrumental)
14. Grindpojken
15. Jag räknar dagarna
16. All Shook Up

== Charts ==
Chart (1990)	Peak position
Sweden (Sverigetopplistan)	15
