= Kramgoa låtar 1998 =

Studio album by Vikingarna
- Released: 19 October 1998
- Genre: dansband music
- Length: circa 40 minutes
- Label: NMG

Vikingarna chronology
Kramgoa låtar 1997 (1997)	Kramgoa låtar 1998 (1998)	Kramgoa låtar 1999 (1999)

Kramgoa låtar 1998 was released in 1998 as CD and cassette tape and is a Vikingarna studio album. It sold platinum in both Sweden and Norway, and sold totally 175 000 copies.

== Track listing ==
=== Side A ===
1. Kan man älska nå'n på avstånd
2. Skogsstjärna
3. One Night with You
4. Kom till mej
5. Lika blå som dina ögon
6. En gammaldags låt
7. När det regnar

=== Side B ===
1. En söndag i April
2. Galen i dig
3. Små små ord
4. Min sång om kärleken
5. Änglasjäl
6. Treat Me Nice
7. Jag saknar dig

== Charts ==
Chart (1998–1999)	Peak position
Norway (VG-lista)	10
Sweden (Sverigetopplistan)	4
