= Gunnar Wiklund =

Swedish singer

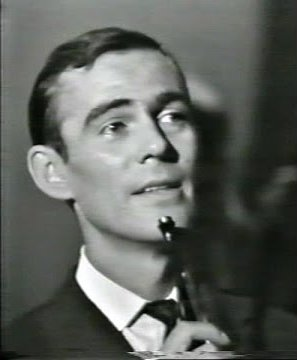
- Wiklund performing in April 1966

Background information
- Born: Lars Gunnar Wiklund; 17 August 1935; Luleå, Sweden
- Died: 29 September 1989 (aged 54) Värmdö, Sweden
- Occupation: Singer
- Years active: 1959–1978
- Musical career
- Genres: Schlager
- Instrument: Vocals

Lars Gunnar Wiklund (17 August 1935 – 29 September 1989) was a Swedish singer. He scored several Svensktoppen hits, and participated in Melodifestivalen four times.

== Early life ==
Lars Gunnar Wiklund was born on 17 August 1935 in Luleå, Sweden, as the first child of Ellen and Sven Wiklund.

== Discography ==
- Gunnar Wiklund (1960)
- 32´29 minuter med Gunnar Wiklund (1966)
- Gunnar Wiklund sjunger Jim Reeves (1970)
- Minnenas melodier (1979)

== Famous Gunnar Wiklund songs ==
- Minns du den sommar (Greenfields)
- Regntunga skyar
- Vi ska gå hand i hand (Dunja, du)
- Han måste gå (1960, previously recorded by Cacka Israelsson in 1959, a Swedish cover of Jim Reeves' He'll Have to Go, 1959)
- Mest av allt
- Kan jag hjälpa att jag älskar dig ännu
- Man ska visa lite ömhet mot varandra
- Snart så kommer åter ljusa tider
- Akta dig för indianerna
- Nu tändas åter ljusen i min lilla stad
- Glöm din dröm
- I en röd liten stuga
- Ensam – Georgia on my mind
- Känn dig lite happy
- En gång i vårt sommarland (Greensleeves)
