= Kramgoa låtar 2002 =

Studio album by Vikingarna
- Released: 16 September 2002
- Recorded: Purple Sound Studio, Stockholm, Sweden, April–August 2002
- Genre: dansband music
- Length: circa 45 minutes
- Label: Frituna (CD); NMG (MC)

Vikingarna chronology
Tanz mit mir (2001)	Kramgoa låtar 2002 (2002)	Romantica (2002)

Kramgoa låtar 2002 is a studio album by Vikingarna, released in 2002. The song "En vän som du" charted at Svensktoppen, and the album became the band's first to top the Swedish albums chart since Kramgoa låtar 3 in 1976.

== Track listing ==
1. En vän som du
2. Visst är det kärlek
3. Vägen hem
4. En sommar i Provence
5. Vi ska vandra tillsammans
6. Våren 1972
7. Har du en vän
8. Om du bara vill
9. Älskling
10. Kiss me Quick
11. Hjälp mig ur min ensamhet
12. Små ord av kärlek
13. Nu eller aldrig
14. Genom alla år
15. Du bara du

== Charts ==
=== Weekly charts ===
Chart (2002)	Peak position
Finnish Albums (Suomen virallinen lista)	25
Norwegian Albums (VG-lista)	4
Swedish Albums (Sverigetopplistan)	1

=== Year-end charts ===
Chart (2002)	Position
Swedish Albums (Sverigetopplistan)	37
