= Vid en liten fiskehamn =

Song by Lasse Stefanz

from the album Darlin'
- Language: Swedish
- Released: 1979
- Genre: Danceband music
- Songwriter: Jan Christer Ericsson

"Vid en liten fiskehamn" is a song written by Jan Christer Ericsson in Lasse Stefanz, and originally thought to become a hit song with the own band. Lasse Stefanz recorded the song on the 1979 album Darlin', and it also appeared on the band's 1992 album På begäran.

In 1981, the song was recorded by seval dansbands, including Bepers! on the album Blandat för dej. Nr 3, Cedermarks the album Hem till Norrland, Dannys the album Vid en liten fiskehamn and Thorleifs the album Saxgodingar instrumentalt.

In 1981, the song was also recorded by Curt Haagers on the album Dansa kvack kvack, with Stefan Borsch as guest artist, and Stefan Borsch's own recording became successful, charting at Svensktoppen for 10 weeks between 29 November 1981-7 March 1982, peaking at first position. Stefan Borsch even released it as a single with Dom vänder hem från Amerika (US of America) as B-side. and it also appeared on his album Minns att jag finns the same year.

The song lyrics depict a seaman drowning in a boating accident, reminding of seaman's songs of old days. Arve Sigvaldsen has written lyrics in Norwegian, "I en liten fiskehavn", recorded by Eikaas og de.. on the album Litt av hvert (Bare Bra Musikk EIKAAS06) i 2004.The Stefan Borschs single is one of the titles in the book Tusen svenska klassiker (2009).
