= Kramgoa låtar 1995 =

Studio album by Vikingarna
- Released: September 18, 1995
- Genre: dansband music
- Length: circa 40 minutes
- Label: NMG

Vikingarna chronology
På begäran (1994)	Kramgoa låtar 1995 (1995)	Kramgoa låtar 1997 (1997)

Kramgoa låtar 1995 is a 1995 Vikingarna studio album, released as CD and cassette tape. With the album, Vikingarna charted at the Finnish album chart for the first time. The album sold platinum (over 100 000 copies) in Sweden, and platinum (over 50 000 copies) in Norway. It sold a total of 190 000 copies throughout Scandinavia and Finland. Three songs from the album charted at Svensktoppen, "I kväll", "Vänd dig inte om" and "Sommar, sol och varma vindar".

== Track listing ==
1. I kväll
2. Vänd dig inte om
3. Om du vågar och vill
4. Crazy
5. Låt oss börja om (Save Your Heart for Me)
6. Sommar sol och varma vindar
7. Med varsam hand
8. Vägen hem
9. Kärleken förde oss samman
10. I Need Your Love Tonight
11. Bilder av dig (Crocodile Shoes)
12. Du är livet
13. Take Your Time

== Charts ==
Chart (1995–1996)	Peak position
Finnish Albums (Suomen virallinen lista)	31
Norwegian Albums (VG-lista)	20
Swedish Albums (Sverigetopplistan)	3
