= Kramgoa låtar 1997 =

Studio album by Vikingarna
- Released: 20 October 1997
- Genre: dansband music
- Length: circa 40 minutes
- Label: NMG

Vikingarna chronology
Kramgoa låtar 1995 (1995)	Kramgoa låtar 1997 (1997)	Kramgoa låtar 1998 (1998)

Kramgoa låtar 1997 is a 1997 Vikingarna studio album, released as CD and cassette tape. The album's major hit song, "Du gav mej ljusa minnen", charted at Svensktoppen for five weeks. The album sold platinum in Sweden, gold in Norway, and totally 160 000 copies throughout the Nordic region.

== Track listing ==
1. Små nära ting
2. Samma tid samma plats
3. Du gav mej ljusa minnen
4. Good Luck Charm
5. Var det någnting som jag sa
6. Min barndomstid
7. I en roddbåt till Kina (On a slow boat to China)
8. I en roddbåt till Kina
9. Sån't rår inte åren på
10. Jag vill ha dej mer
11. En enkel sång om kärlek
12. Ingenting
13. Inga stora bevingade ord
14. Adios amigo

== Charts ==
Chart (1997–1998)	Peak position
Finnish Albums (Suomen virallinen lista)	35
Norwegian Albums (VG-lista)	5
Swedish Albums (Sverigetopplistan)	2
