= Kramgoa låtar 2001 =

Studio album by Vikingarna
- Released: September 17, 2001
- Recorded: KMH Studio, Stockholm, Sweden, May–August 2001
- Genre: dansband
- Length: circa 41 minutes
- Label: NMG

Vikingarna chronology
Vore danske favoriter (2001)	Kramgoa låtar 2001 (2001)	Tanz mit mir (2001)

Kramgoa låtar 2001 is a studio album by Vikingarna, released in 2001.

== Track listing ==
1. Att älska någon så
2. En gång till, om du vill
3. Jag sänder en tanke
4. De gamla
5. Lyckan kommer, lyckan går
6. Det var sommar
7. Låt oss fånga vår dag
8. Alla våra drömmar
9. Kärlek i blåa jeans
10. Du får mig att längta hem
11. Alla dessa underbara år
12. Let Me Be There
13. Min kärlek till dej
14. Livets trädgård

== Charts ==
Chart (2001)	Peak position
Norway (VG-lista)	4
Sweden (Sverigetopplistan)	2
