= Min soldat =

"Min soldat" (English: "My Soldier") is a Swedish song written by Nils Perne (Jokern). It was recorded by Ulla Billquist in 1940 and became one of the most popular Swedish songs during World War II.

Carroll Loveday wrote new English lyrics for the song, which became "The Shrine of St. Cecilia". It was recorded by numerous artists.

== Origins ==
The song was written for and first performed by Naemi Briese in Gosta Jonsson’s revue Det kommer en vår at the Folkan theatre in Stockholm. In the song, a woman is thinking of her fiance who is a soldier "somewhere in Sweden" ("någonstans i Sverige"). She recalls how fashionable he was in comparison to the photograph of him in an ill-fitting uniform. He has told her that they cannot afford to get married this year, and when he arrived yesterday on leave and took her to a dance, he was so tired that he fell asleep at the table. She says she does not mind because he is her "soldier somewhere in Sweden".

Hans skor är för stora och hans mössa för trång
hans byxor för smala och hans rock är för lång
men det gör detsamma för han är min soldat
någonstans i Sverige

Translated to English:

His shoes are too large and his cap too tight
his pants too small and his coat is too long
but it does not matter for he is my soldier
somewhere in Sweden

== Ulla Billquist version ==
"Min soldat"

Single by Ulla Billquist
- Released: 1940
- Recorded: 8 May 1940
- Genre: Schlager
- Length: 3:16
- Label: Sonora
- Songwriter: Nils Perne (Jokern)

Ulla Billquist recorded the song for Swedish record company Sonora on 8 May 1940. The recording was Billquist's first for Sonora after she was lured from Sonora's competitor Columbia for a monthly salary of US$700. Sven Arefeldt was the arranger and led the orchestra. The song became Billquist's most popular recording in Sweden.

Several recordings was made with other female singers for other record companies. Among them were Karin Juel and Siv Ericks.

=== Revival ===
The song was revived again in 1973 when the author Jan Olof Olsson ("Jolo") used a line from the song as title for his TV-series Någonstans i Sverige, set in Sweden during World War II. Billquist's recording was used as theme song.

== Other versions ==
- Carroll Loveday wrote new English lyrics for the song, which became "The Shrine of St. Cecilia" in the United States. It was recorded by The Andrews Sisters with Vic Schoen & His Orchestra on 15 November 1941 and reached #3 in January 1942. Its lyrics describe a hillside shrine which is miraculously spared the ravages of a storm that destroys a nearby town. This was later recorded by a number of American close harmony and doo-wop groups during the 20th century such as Willie Winfield, The Harptones, The Royals and The Bon Aires.
- In 1957, Faron Young had a minor pop hit with his version.
- The song was performed in the film Jazzgossen (1958) by Maj-Britt Nilsson.
- Former ABBA member Anni-Frid Lyngstad recorded the song in 1970 for the TV show "När stenkakan slog", a program made to honour the hits off the old gramophone records. A video was also made for the song, with her sitting in a train compartment.
- "Min soldat" was recorded by Danish singer Birthe Kjær and Helmer Olesens orkester on the record Det var en yndig tid. The Danish lyrics was written by Knud Feiffer.
