= Kramgoa låtar 1999 =

Studio album by Vikingarna
- Released: August 23, 1999
- Genre: dansband music
- Length: circa 42 minutes
- Label: NMG

Vikingarna chronology
Kramgoa låtar 1998 (1999)	Kramgoa låtar 1999 (1999)	Laulava sydän (1999)

Kramgoa låtar 1999 was released in 1999 as CD and cassette tape. It is a Vikingarna studio album.

== Track listing ==
1. Våran lilla hemlighet
2. En slant i fontänen
3. Still
4. I mina drömmar
5. Sjömannen & stjärnan
6. Vi ska gå hand i hand (Dunja, du)
7. Nummer ett
8. Ditt första steg
9. Kom med mej
10. Sänd mej ett minne av vår kärlek
11. Wear My Ring around Your Neck
12. Ett brev betyder så mycket
13. Om jag faller faller jag för dig
14. Sången till dej
15. Vindar från nordväst (Kuling fra nordvest) (duet Christer Sjögren-Monia Sjöström)

== Contributors ==
- Vikingarna
- Peter Ljung - keyboard
- Janne Lindgren - guitar
- Kungliga hovkapellet - strings

== Charts ==
Chart (1999)	Peak position
Finland (The Official Finnish Charts)	19
Norway (VG-lista)	3
Sweden (Sverigetopplistan)	2

== Certifications ==
Region	Certification	Certified units/sales
Norway (IFPI Norway)	Platinum	50,000^{*}
Sweden (GLF)	Platinum	80,000^{^}
^{*} Sales figures based on certification alone.^{^} Shipments figures based on certification alone.
