= Anders Engbergs =

- Origin: Skara, Sweden
- Genres: Dansband music
- Years active: 1994–2000

Anders Engbergs was a dansband in Skara, Sweden, reestablished in 1994 when Lotta & Anders Engbergs orkester divided into two bands, Anders Engbergs and Lotta Engbergs, three years after the divorce of husband Anders Engberg and wife Lotta Engberg. Anders Engbergs had also been the name of the pre-split band prior to Lotta Engberg joining it in 1989. One of the more famous singers in its lineup up to 1988 was Stefan Borsch.

Björn Hedström, who was one of Anders Engbergs' singers, participated in the Swedish Melodifestivalen 1995 with the song "Du är drömmen jag drömt". Anders Engbergs had some Svensktoppen hits, but never achieved the same level of successes as Lotta Engbergs.

Charlotte Perrelli (then known as Charlotte Nilsson) had her breakthrough while in this band, laying the foundation for her later successes in Melodifestivalen as a solo artist.

Another member was Martin Rydnemalm, who later played the guitar and saxophone in Kim & Hallo.

In 1998 the band won the contest "Dansbandslåten" with the song "När kärleken slår till".

== Discography ==
=== Albums ===
- Glöm inte bort - 1995
- Lova mig - 1996
- När Kärleken Slår Till - 1999

== Svensktoppen songs ==
- Glöm inte bort - 1994
- Du är drömmen jag drömt - 1995
- Ge dej tid - 1995
- Glöm inte bort - 1994
- Av hela mitt hjärta - 1996
- Kärleken i dina ögon - 1998
- När kärleken slår till - 1999
- Tusen år - 2000

=== Songs failing to enter the chart ===
- En blå sommardag - 1997
- Minnenas värld - 1997
- Är du min nu - 1999
- Det är sommaren som vaknat - 1999
