= Karl Seip =

Minister of Education and Church Affairs
- In office 19 March 1908 – 8 July 1909
- Prime Minister: Gunnar Knudsen
- Preceded by: Abraham Berge
- Succeeded by: Johannes Hougen

Personal details
- Born: 5 April 1850 Christiania, United Kingdoms of Sweden and Norway
- Died: 16 September 1909 (aged 59) Lillehammer, Oppland, Norway
- Party: Liberal
- Spouse: Thea Seip
- Children: Ellen Seip
- Occupation: Priest; Educator

Karl Seip (5 April 1850 – 16 September 1909) was a Norwegian priest and educator, who also served as the Minister of Education and Church Affairs from 1908 to 1909.

== Personal life ==
Karl Seip was born in Christiania as the son of priest Hans Christian Caspar Seip (1812-1872) and grandson of military officer and politician Andreas Martin Seip (1790–1850).

Through his brother, priest Jens Laurits Arup Seip, Karl was the uncle of Hans Kristian Seip and Didrik Arup Seip, and a granduncle of Hans Kristian and Jens Arup Seip. Through another brother, priest Martin Fredrik Seip, Karl was a granduncle of Helge and Martin Fredrik Seip.

== Career ==
Karl Seip graduated with the cand.theol. degree in 1873, and was hired as a teacher at the Botsfengselet prison the next year. He was then appointed vicar at Åfjord Church in 1883 and in Fosen in 1890. From 1898 to 1908 he worked as school director in the Diocese of Trondhjem.

In 1908, when the Liberal first cabinet Knudsen assumed office, Seip was appointed as Minister of Education and Church Affairs. He was granted a leave of absence on 8 July 1909, his place taken by acting Minister Knut Johannes Hougen. Seip died only two months later.

Political offices
Preceded by Abraham Berge	Norwegian Minister of Education and Church Affairs; 1908–1909	Succeeded by Knut Johannes Hougen
