= Knut Johannes Hougen =

Norwegian politician (1854–1954)

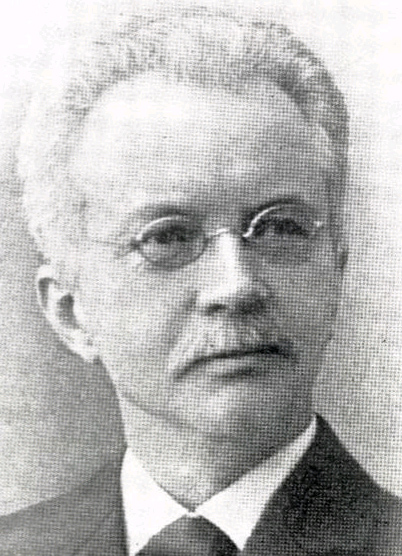

Minister of Education and Church Affairs
- In office 8 July 1909 – 2 February 1910
- Prime Minister: Gunnar Knudsen
- Preceded by: Karl Seip
- Succeeded by: Just Qvigstad

Personal details
- Born: Knut Johannes Hougen; 26 November 1854 Kragerø, Telemark, United Kingdoms of Sweden and Norway
- Died: 29 July 1954 (aged 99) Bærum, Akershus, Norway
- Party: Liberal
- Spouse(s): Elise Aars Isefjær (m. 1915); Helene Elise Aars Ziesler (1885–1909)
- Children: Peter; Ernst

Knut Johannes Hougen (26 November 1854 – 29 July 1954) was a Norwegian politician for the Liberal Party. He served as Minister of Education and Church Affairs from 1909 to 1910. Hougen was also a representative for the city of Kristiansand in the Norwegian Parliament in the period 1908–27. He was central to the development of broadcasting in Norway, and in 1932 published the 2-volume work Oslo kringkastingsselskaps historie ("The Development of Oslo Broadcasting Corporation").
