= Kramgoa låtar 10 =

Studio album by Vikingarna
- Released: March 1982
- Genre: dansband music
- Length: circa 44 minutes
- Label: Mariann Records

Vikingarna chronology
Kramgoa låtar 9 (1981)	Kramgoa låtar 10 (1982)	Kramgoa låtar 11 (1984)

Kramgoa låtar 10 is a 1982 Vikingarna studio album. The album was rereleased to CD in 1988 and 1992.

== Track listing ==
1. Den stora dagen
2. Skomakaranton
3. Dance in the Old Fashioned Way
4. Jag vill va din teddybjörn (Teddy Bear)
5. Spanish Eyes
6. San Antonios ros
7. Under himmel och över öppet hav
8. Nyanser
9. Boogie Woogie över stan
10. En sliten grimma
11. Det låter knackelibang
12. Längtan efter solsken
13. Ett gammalt dragspel
14. Ge mig vingar som bär mig
15. Blonda svenska vikingar

== Charts ==
Chart (1982)	Peak position
Swedish Albums (Sverigetopplistan)	4
