= Kramgoa låtar 17 =

Studio album by Vikingarna
- Released: April 1989
- Genre: dansband music
- Length: circa 40 minutes
- Label: NMG

Vikingarna chronology
Kramgoa låtar 16 (1988)	Kramgoa låtar 17 (1989)	Kramgoa låtar 18 (1990)

Kramgoa låtar 17 is a 1989 studio album by Vikingarna.

== Track listing ==
1. Speleman
2. En vissnad blomma
3. Melodien
4. Jag ville bara krama dej
5. Mest av allt
6. Sista natten med gänget
7. Sitter i regnet
8. Spinnrocken
9. Tre röda rosor
10. Vill du och kan du så får du
11. Piccolissima Serenata
12. Lev som du lär
13. Innan tåget ska gå
14. Gran Canaria
15. Vikingablod

== Chart positions ==
Chart (1989)	Peak position
Sweden	11
