= Kramgoa låtar 2000 =

Studio album by Vikingarna
- Released: 21 August 2000
- Recorded: KMH Studio, Stockholm, Sweden, March–July 2000
- Genre: Dansband
- Length: circa 43 minutes
- Label: NMG

Vikingarna chronology
Kuschel dich in meine Arme (2000)	Kramgoa låtar 2000 (2000)	100% Vikingarna (2000)

Kramgoa låtar 2000 is a studio album by Vikingarna, released on 21 August 2000.

== Track listing ==
1. Ett liv i kärlek
2. Livet går ej i repris
3. Love Letters in the Sand
4. Du är det bästa som har hänt
5. Aldrig nånsin ska jag glömma dej
6. Jag vet
7. Ett steg till
8. Det kan aldrig bli vi två
9. Min bästa tid har jag kvar
10. Vi två
11. Du har fått mej tro på kärleken
12. Kom stanna kvar
13. It's Now or Never
14. En enda blick

== Charts ==
Chart (2000)	Peak position
Finnish Albums (Suomen virallinen lista)	38
Norwegian Albums (VG-lista)	6
Swedish Albums (Sverigetopplistan)	2
