= Ulla Billquist =

Swedish singer

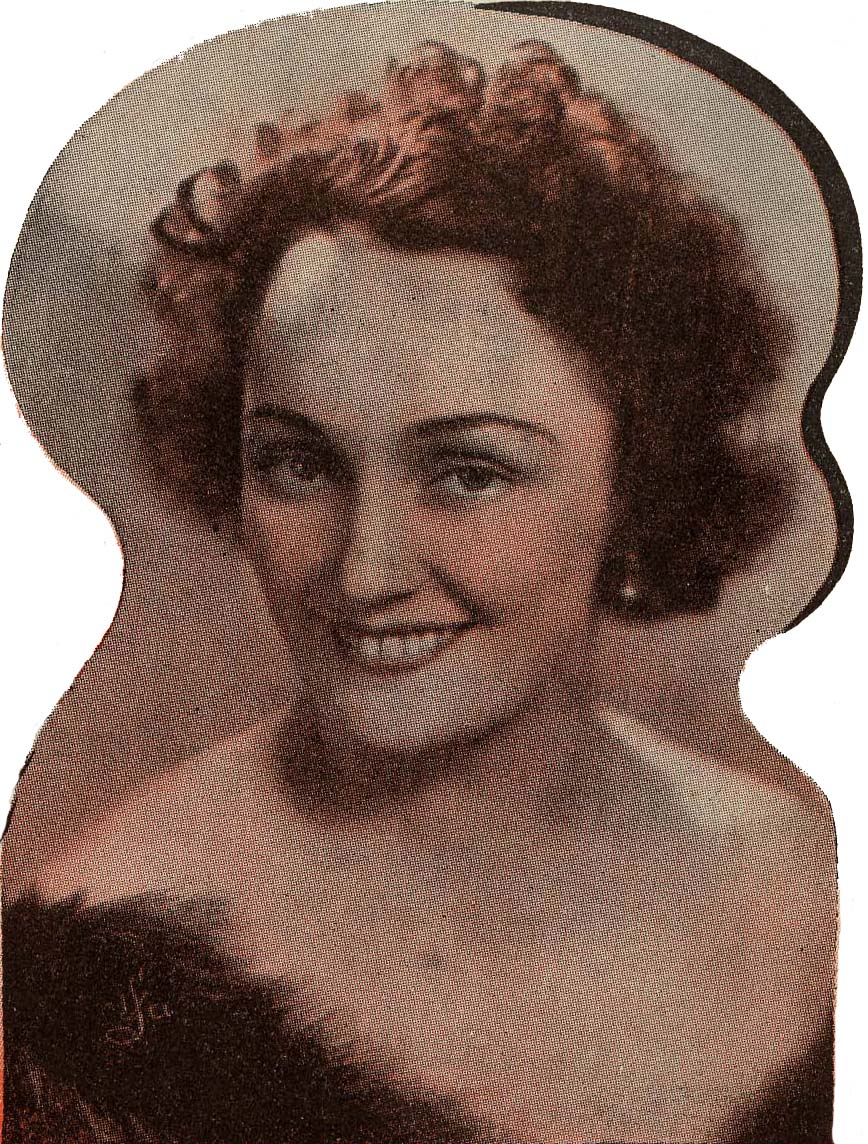
- Billquist in 1941

Background information
- Born: Ulla Ebba Ingegerd Schönström; 14 August 1907; Eslöv, Sweden
- Died: 6 July 1946 (aged 38) Stockholm, Sweden
- Genre: Schlager
- Occupation: Singer
- Years active: 1925–1946
- Labels: Pathé; Columbia; Sonora
- Formerly of: Nils Perne; Willard Ringstrand
- Spouses: Fritiof Billquist (m. 1926; div. 1934) Wolmar Sjögren (m. 1936; died 1942) Gunnar Hahn (m. 1943)

Ulla Ebba Ingegerd Billquist (née Schönström; 14 August 1907 – 6 July 1946) was a Swedish female schlager singer. She was successful during the early 1940s.

== Personal life ==
Ulla Billquist married three times; firstly from 1926 to 1934 to the actor Fritiof Billquist (1901–1972), then to the director Wolmar Sjögren (1901–1974) from 1936 to 1942, and finally to the composer, accordionist and the pianist Gunnar Hahn (1908–2001) in 1943 until her death. At the time of her death, she had been separated from her third husband, Gunnar Hahn, since the winter of 1946. They were in the process of divorcing, which had not been finalised when she died.

== Discography ==
- Parfym-visan, Pathé, December 1929
- Ett enda litet finger, Pathé, December 1929
- Fusyjama, Pathé, December 1929
- Vad kvinnan vill, vill du, Pathé, December 1929
- Anna Aurora, Columbia, December 1930
- Vaggvisa, Columbia, December 1930
- Casanova, Columbia, December 1930
- Min soldat (1940)
- Kring de små husen i gränderna vid hamnen (1942)
- Köp rosor, Monsieur (1942)
- Räkna de lyckliga stunderna blott (1944)
- På återseende (1945)
