= Donnez =

Swedish dansband

- Origin: Perstorp, Sweden
- Genres: Dansband music
- Years active: 2000-

Donnez is a Swedish dansband from Perstorp, Skåne, Sweden established in 2000. The band has Donald "Donne" Laitila as kapellmeister, and on keyboard and accordion and vocals, Andy Ekenmo on vocals and drums, Max Lindqvist on guitar, Albin Fredriksson on saxophone, guitar and accordion, Fredrik Trangbjork on saxophone and guitar, Martin Lindberg on bass/base.

In 2010, they took in the Dansbandskampen, a danceband competition show putting bands to compete against each other on Swedish television station SVT1

In July 2016, Donnez played their first live shows ever in the United States when they headlined the 15th annual three-day Scandinavian Folk Festival near Jamestown, New York. Jamestown was the destination of many Swedish immigrants during the late 1800s and early 1900s.

== Discography ==
=== Albums ===
| Year | Album | Peak positions |
| Year | Album | SWE |
|---|---|---|
| 2009 | De é du | – |
| 2010 | Om du kommer tillbaka | – |
| 2011 | Den enda sommaren | 7 |
| 2012 | Acapulco | 7 |
| 2013 | Om du vill åka med | 12 |
| 2014 | Allt ljus på oss | 19 |
| 2014 | Vem tänker på tomten | 31 |
| 2015 | Stora starka män | 7 |
| 2016 | Många långa mil | 8 |
| 2017 | Akta dig för svärmor | 4 |
| 2018 | Grabben från landet | 7 |
| 2019 | Donnez Live | 9 |
| 2019 | Med stora steg | 6 |
| 2020 | Med värme och iskall champagne | 7 |
| 2021 | Alla dar i veckan | 1 |
| 2022 | Bucket List | 5 |
| 2023 | Skön Style | 5 |
| 2024 | Hole in One | 12 |
| 2025 | 25 år på vägarna | 10 |
| 2026 | Frågor på det | 53 |
