= Hans Martin (singer) =

Finnish-Swedish singer

- Born: 1950 (age 74–75); Vaasa, Finland
- Genres: Dansband music Gospel
- Occupation: Singer

Hans Martin (born in Vaasa, Finland in 1946) is a Finnish-Swedish singer, with a long repertoire of dansband music. For the period 1986 to 2000, he was also the solo vocalist for the dansband group Tommys. As a solo artist, he has scored chart successes in Norway and Sweden.

== Solo discography ==
=== Albums ===
Year	Title	Peak position	Certification
Year	Title	SWE	Certification
2002	Landet där solen ej går ner	4	
2004	Den blomstertid nu kommer	16	
2005	Minnenas promenad	19	
2007	Mina egna favoriter (credited as Hans Martin & Tommys)	5	
2008	Där rosor aldrig dör	–	
2009	Höstglöd	38	
2012	Här är jag hemma	2	
2013	Vägen hem	13	
