= Andreas Martin Seip =

Norwegian politician

Andreas Martin Seip (26 December 1790 – 10 September 1850) was a Norwegian military officer and politician.

He was the son of dr.med. Christian Caspar "Jesper" Seip (1751–1806), who had migrated to Norway from Copenhagen. Both Andreas Martin Seip and his brother Jesper Gotlieb Seip (1793–1865) had a military career, reaching the rank of lieutenant colonel. Andreas Martin Seip also served as a road inspector. He was elected to the Norwegian Parliament in 1821, representing the constituency of Frederiksstad. He only served one term.

Andreas Martin Seip was a paternal grandfather of educator and politician Karl Seip, priest Jens Laurits Arup Seip and priest Martin Fredrik Seip. Through Jens Laurits he was a great-grandfather of politician Hans Kristian Seip and academic Didrik Arup Seip.
