= Annika Hagström =

Swedish journalist, documentary filmer, television presenter, singer and author

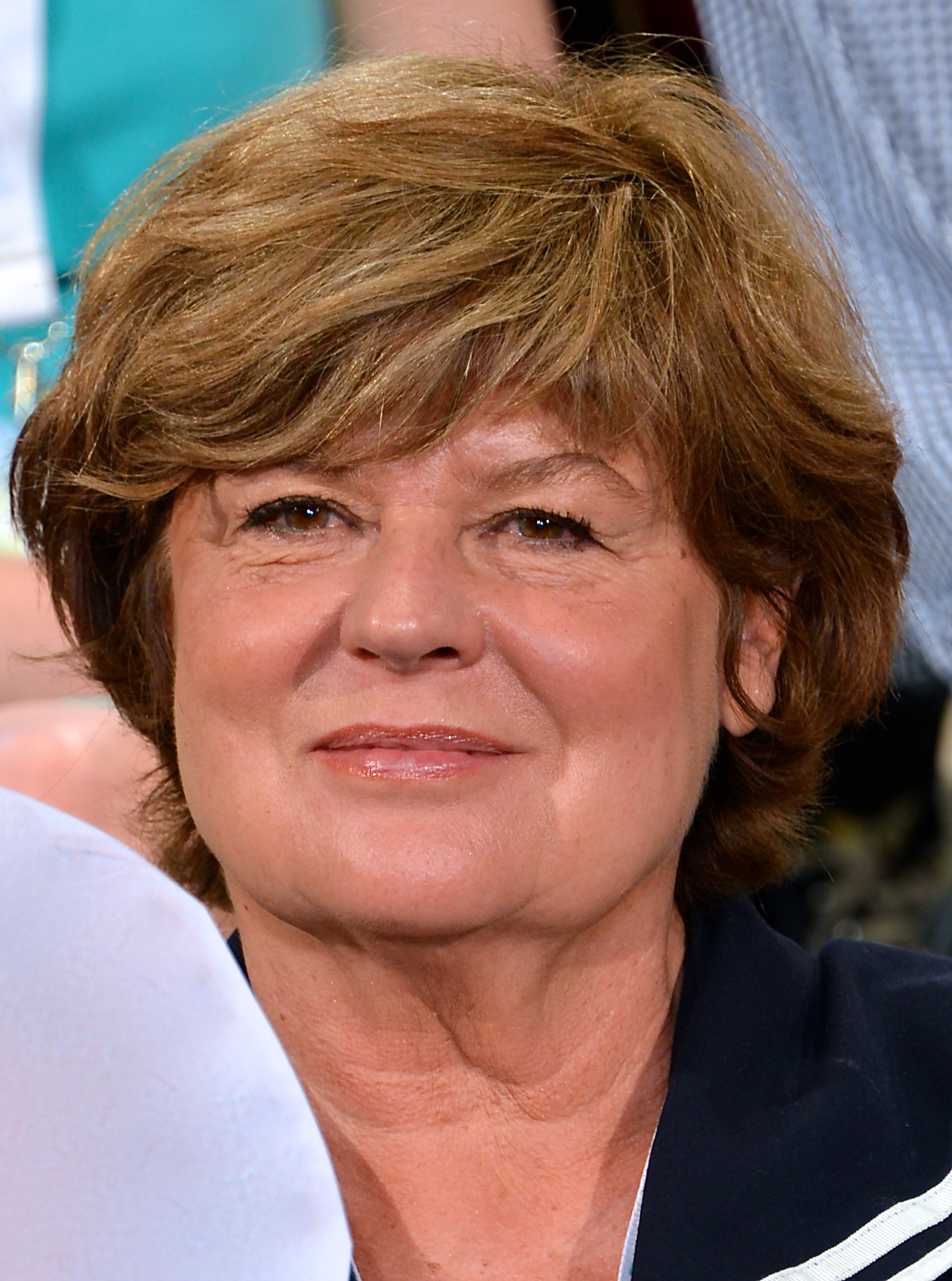
- Hagström in 2013
- Born: 25 November 1942 (age 83); Stockholm, Sweden
- Occupations: Author, journalist, television presenter

Else Annika Hagström (born 11 October 1942) is a Swedish journalist, documentary filmer, television presenter, singer and author. She has written for Flamman, and also worked for Expressen newspaper for seven years. She has also worked in television on TV4 with shows like Rikets affärer, and as well as 23 years at SVT where she has presented shows like Caramba! and Magazinet. Since 1997 she is a freelance journalist. She has also made thirteen documentaries for TV4. She has also presented the Sveriges Radio show Ring P1.

During the 1980s, Hagström released a few music singles along with Jacob Dahlin and the group Vikingarna. Hagström has been the host of Sommar i P1 three times in 1985, 1986 and 2013 where she told about her life and other subjects.
