= Just Knud Qvigstad =

Norwegian philologist, ethnographer, historian, and politician (1853–1957)

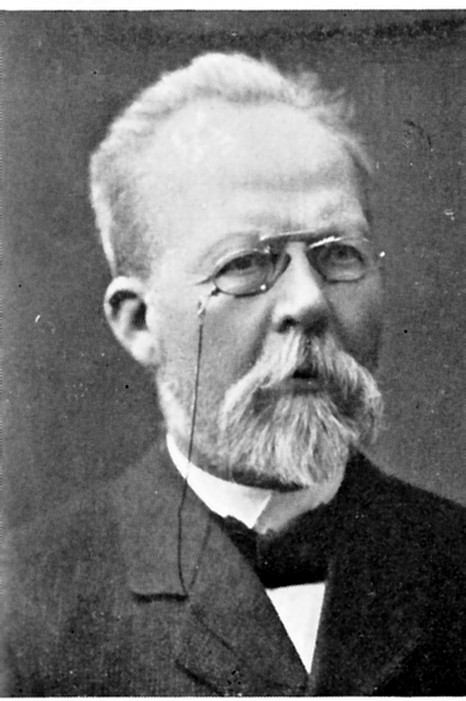

Minister of Education and Church Affairs
- In office 2 February 1910 – 20 February 1912
- Prime Minister: Wollert Konow
- Preceded by: Johannes Hougen
- Succeeded by: Edvard Liljedahl

Mayor of Tromsø
- In office 1 January 1905 – 31 December 1905
- Deputy: Thomas Eidem
- Preceded by: Oscar Schønberg
- Succeeded by: Thomas Eidem
- In office 1 January 1899 – 31 December 1899
- Deputy: Thomas Eidem
- Preceded by: Daniel Mack
- Succeeded by: Thomas Eidem

Deputy Mayor of Tromsø
- In office 1 January 1906 – 31 December 1906
- Mayor: Thomas Eidem
- Preceded by: Thomas Eidem
- Succeeded by: Thomas Eidem
- In office 1 January 1900 – 31 December 1901
- Mayor: Thomas Eidem
- Preceded by: Thomas Eidem
- Succeeded by: Oscar Schønberg

Personal details
- Born: 4 April 1853 Lyngseidet, Troms, United Kingdoms of Sweden and Norway
- Died: 15 March 1957 (aged 103) Tromsø, Troms, Norway
- Party: Conservative
- Spouse: Margrethe Antonette Aagaard (m. 1885)
- Children: Just Knut Qvigstad
- Education: Royal Frederick University (cand.philol. 1874, cand.theol. 1881)
- Occupation: Headmaster, researcher
- Profession: Philologist, theologian

Just Knud Qvigstad (4 April 1853 – 15 March 1957) was a Norwegian philologist, linguist, ethnographer, historian and cultural historian. He was also a headmaster in Tromsø, and a politician for the Conservative Party who served as mayor of Tromsø and as Minister of Education and Church Affairs.

== Personal life ==
He was born in Lyngseidet as a son of district physician Engebret Qvigstad (1814–1869) and Petra Krogh Wadel (1828–1905). In August 1885 in Hammerfest he married Margrethe Antonette Aagaard (1859–1949). Their son Just Knut Qvigstad was a notable engineer. He was also a brother-in-law of Arnfinn Palmstrøm.

== Career in education and politics ==
He was homeschooled until the age of ten, when he moved to Tromsø where he took the examen artium in 1869. He enrolled in philology studies at the Royal Frederick University in 1870 and graduated with the cand.philol. degree in 1874. He was a teacher in Christiania from 1874 to 1875 and in Tromsø from 1875 to 1880, from 1878 at Tromsø Seminary. He studied from 1880 to 1881 to take the cand.theol. degree, and was hired as headmaster at Tromsø Seminary in 1883. He remained here to 1920. From 1910 to 1912 he was the Minister of Education and Church Affairs in Konow's Cabinet. As a politician he was also a member of Tromsø city council from 1889 to 1907, serving as mayor in the years 1889, 1905 and 1907.

== Academic career ==
Qvigstad also made a name for himself as an academic. An interest in Sami language and culture started when he was hired at Tromsø Seminary, and he published his first of 112 academic works in 1881. This was Beiträge zur Vergleichung des verwandten Wortvorrathes der Lappischen und der finnischen Sprache, published in the Finnish journal Acta Societatis Scientiarum Fennicae. Other important linguistic works include Nordische Lehnwörter in Lappischen (1893). He co-wrote the eighteenth volume of Norske Gaardnavne, about farm names and place names in Finnmark, and followed with Spitsbergens stedsnavne før 1900 (1927), De lappiske stedsnavn i Troms fylke (1935), De lappiske stedsnavn i Finnmark og Nordland fylker (1938) and De lappiske appellative stedsnavn (1944). Historical works include Den kvenske indvandring til Nord-Norge (1921), about Kven immigration to Northern Norway. Cultural historical works include Lappiske Eventyr og Folkesagn (with Georg Sandberg, 1887), Lappiske eventyr og sagn (four volumes, 1927–1929) and Lappische Heilkunde (1932). His academic institution was Tromsø Museum, where he was a board member from 1884, and curator of the Sami collections from 1884 to 1931. However, most of his publications came after his retirement age. His last academic work was Opptegnelser fra samenes liv, released in 1954 when Qvigstad was 101 years old.

He was a member of the Société Finno-Ougrienne from 1885, the Norwegian Academy of Science and Letters from 1888 and the Royal Norwegian Society of Sciences and Letters in 1894. He was an honorary member of the Société Finno-Ougrienne from 1910 and Tromsø Museum from 1926, and Festschrifts were issued for his 75th and 100th birthdays. He was awarded the Gunnerus Medal in 1930, and in 1943 a "Headmaster Qvigstad's Gold Medal" was inaugurated by Tromsø Museum. He was decorated as a Commander with Star of the Royal Norwegian Order of St. Olav in 1912, and as a Commander of the Order of the White Rose of Finland.

He was a co-founder and board member of Norsk Finnemission from 1888 to 1916 and of the regional Norwegian Bible Society office from 1889 to 1910. He was also a board member of Tromsø Sparebank.

Political offices
| Preceded by Knut Johannes Hougen | Minister of Education and Church Affairs; 1910–1912 | Succeeded by Edvard Liljedahl |
