= Seipp =

Seipp may refer to:

- Catherine Seipp (1957–2007), media critic and columnist
- Hilde Seipp (1909-1999), German actress
- Seipp's day gecko (Phelsuma seippi)
