= Hans Martin Hanssen =

Norwegian politician

Hans Martin Hanssen (14 October 1911 – 31 May 1971) was a Norwegian politician for the Labour Party.

He served as a deputy representative to the Parliament of Norway from Finnmark during the term 1950–1953. In total he met during 46 days of parliamentary session.
