= Kindbergs =

- Origin: Sweden
- Genres: Dansband
- Years active: 1986-1989 as Sten-Åkes Jr. 1989-present Kindbergs
- Members: Henrik "Henke" Svensson; Joakim "Jocke" Ekelund; Conny Falk (from 2008)
- Past members: Kent Kindberg (1986-2008)
- Website: kindbergs.nu

Kindbergs is a Swedish dansband. The band was originally known when it was founded in 1986 as Sten-Åkes Jr.. The name was changed to Kindbergs in 1989. The band played various genres but later on started playing country music almost exclusively. The long-time bassist member Kent Kindberg left the band after two decades of playing and was replaced by Ola Jonsson earlier bass player in another Swedish dansband called Svänzons.

The album Nu Reser We Västerut released on the 25th anniversary of the band, was a great commercial success, charting on the Swedish Albums Chart.

== Members ==
- Henrik "Henke" Svensson - keyboards, saxophone, accordion, vocals
- Joakim "Jocke" Ekelund - vocals, guitar, keyboards, saxophone
- Ola Jonsson - Bass, vocals (2008–present)
- Conny Falk - drums

Former members

- Kent Kindberg - bass, vocals (1986-2008)

== Discography ==
=== Albums ===
- 1988: Kindbergs
- 1990: De é fredag
- 2001: Donna Bella Donna
- 2004: Nu och för alltid
- 2007: Collection 20
- 2008: Boots & änglar

| Year | Album | Peak positions |
| Year | Album | SWE |
|---|---|---|
| 2012 | Nu reser vi västerut | 10 |
| 2013 | Den dagen vi möttes | 7 |
| 2014 | Ut på vägarna igen | 47 |
| 2015 | Hela vägen hem | 27 |

=== Singles ===
(Those with * charted in the Swedish Svensktoppen charts)

- 1994: "I ett litet hus"
- 1996: "Det vackraste jag vet"
- 1998: "Ännu blommar kärleken"*
- 1998: "Du är så vacker"*
- 1999: "Louise"*
- 1999: "Ge mig en chans"*
- 2000: "Julia"
- 2001: "Donna Bella Donna"*
- 2002: "Sweet Louisa"
- 2002: "Himlen i min famn"
- 2003: "Sommarvindar"
- 2004: "Nu och för alltid"
- 2008: "Ner till södern"
