= Tommys =

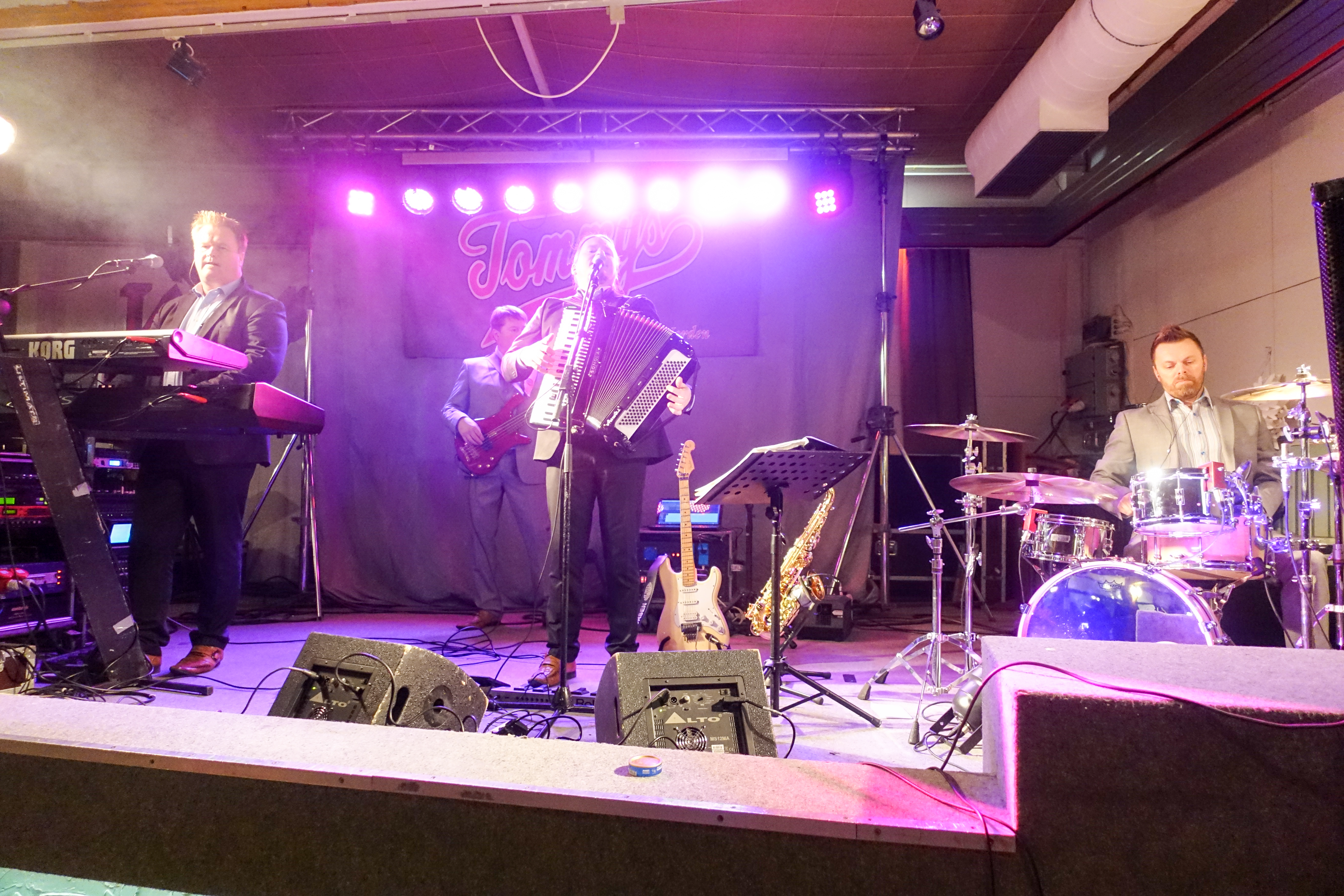

Background information
- Origin: Vaasa, Finland
- Genres: Dansband music
- Years active: 1980-

Tommys is a dansband from Vaasa, established in 1980. Hans Martin was the singer from establishment until the year 2000. During the 1980s, the band mostly played throughout Ostrobothnia, and Swedish-speaking parts of southern Finland. In Sweden, the breakthrough was their 1991 hit "Vår dotter".

== Discography ==
- Sommarhälsning - 1988
- En ny glädje - 1989
- De tusen sjöars land - 1990
- Ensamhet - 1991
- Hyllning till far och mor - 1992
- Som en vårnatt - 1994
- Lyckans land - 1997
- En liten blomma - 1997
- Som vita duvor - 1998
- Min kärlek blommar än - 1999
- Till en vän - 2000
- Aftonstjärnan - 2001
- Tommys bästa (2CD) - 2001
- I kväll ska vi ha fest - 2003
- En dag i taget - 2006
- Stunder av lycka - 2006
- Big-5 - 2010
- Spegelbild (30 år) - 2011
- Sjömannen och stjärnan - 2012
- Nånting - 2013
- Kära mor - 2015
- Våga Vinna - 2018
- Tillsammans - 2020

== Svensktoppen hits ==
- Min kärlek blommar än - 1998-1999
- I kväll ska vi ha fest - 2001
