= Just Knut Qvigstad =

Norwegian engineer (1902–2001)

Just Knut Qvigstad (20 December 1902 – 6 May 2001) was a Norwegian engineer.

He was born in Tromsø as a son of educator and politician Just Knud Qvigstad (1853–1957) and Margrethe Antonette Aagaard (1859–1949). In 1933 he married Gunvor Wefring (1909-1963). He enrolled as a student in 1921, and graduated in electrical engineering from the Norwegian Institute of Technology in 1928. He worked in AEG from 1928, and as an assistant at the Norwegian Institute of Technology from 1929. He took the dr.techn. degree in 1937 with the thesis Zur Theorie des Arbeitsdiagrammes der einphasigen Induktionsmaschine. He was a member of the Royal Norwegian Society of Sciences and Letters.

He worked as an engineer in Glommens Træsliberi from 1936, and chief engineer from 1945. He was a chief engineer in A/S Kykkelsrud, a hydroelectric power plant company, from 1955 before being technical director in the company Hafslund from 1962 to 1969. He was also a member of the Norwegian Electrotechnical Committee from 1943 to 1965 and a board member of Samkjøringen from 1966 to 1969.

He died in May 2001 and was buried in Ullern.
