= Pop opp i topp =

1965 song by Thore Skogman

Song by Thore Skogman and Lill-Babs
- Language: Swedish
- Released: 1965
- Genre: Pop; schlager
- Songwriter: Thore Skogman

"Pop opp i topp" is a song written by Thore Skogman, and was originally recorded as a duet between Thore Skogman and Lill-Babs for the 1965 film Pang i bygget.

Lyrically, the song describe the popular musical developments during the 1950s and 1960s, with electric instruments becoming more common.

== Credits and personnel ==
- Thore Skogman – songwriter, vocals
- Lill-Babs – vocals

== Dag Vag version ==
"Popitop"

Single by Dag Vag
- B-side: "Majskolv"
- Released: 1981
- Recorded: July 1981
- Genre: Rock
- Length: 3:44
- Label: Ball
- Songwriter: Thore Skogman

Swedish rock group Dag Vag recorded the song, releasing it as a single in 1981 with "Majskolv" as B-side. The song was then titled "Popitop", and charted at Svensktoppen for 10 weeks between 28 and 30 March 1982, peaking with two fourth positions the first four weeks. The song stayed at the chart for 10 weeks, and would have remained longer if a song was allowed to stay longer than that at the time.

=== Track listing and formats ===
- Swedish 7-inch single

A. "Popitop" – 3:44
B. "Majskolv" – 2:35

=== Charts ===
Chart (1982)	Peak position
Sweden (Sverigetopplistan)	3
