= Mats Bergmans =

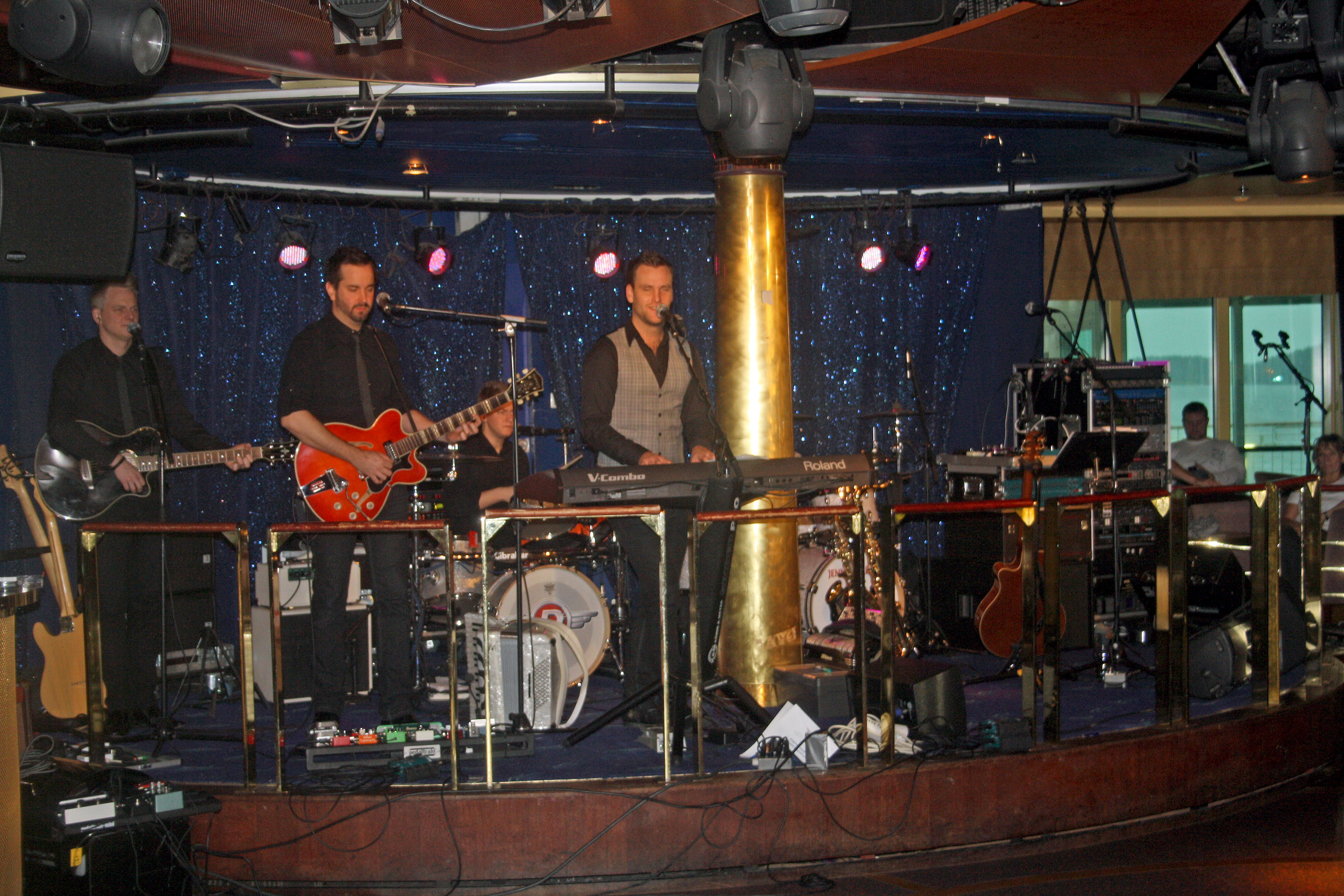
- Mats Bergmans on board MS Birka Paradise in November 2011

Background information
- Origin: Sweden
- Genres: Modern dansband music
- Years active: 1973-

Mats Bergmans is a dansband from Nyköping, Sweden, established in 1973 as Sjösa kustband, before a naming dispute made them change name to Sjösagrabbarna. The band became a full-time band in 1981and changed name to Mats Bergmans in 1987.

== Members ==
- Linus Lindholm - Vocals
- Magnus Nyman – Bass, saxophone, Kapellmeister
- Mikael Eriksson - Guitar
- Torbjörn Kempe - Drums
- Gullmar Bergman - Keyboard

=== Former members ===
- Jonas Näslund - Vocals (1995-2008)
- Urban Ljungqvist - Saxophone

== Discography ==
=== Albums ===
- 1989 - Live i Folkets Park
- 1990 - Live i Folkets Park
- 1991 - Mats Bergmans
- 1992 - Mats Bergmans
- 1997 - 100% chans
- 1999 - Mest önskade - Live
- 2000 - Mest önskade 2
- 2002 - Min egen ängel
- 2004 - Vänd dig inte om
- 2006 - Den stora dagen
- 2007 - Kalifornien
- 2007 - Jubileum
- 2009 - Premiär
- 2011 - Det kommer från hjärtat

=== Singles ===
- 1999 - Säg som det är
- 1999 - Alla världens rosor

== Svensktoppen songs ==
- Har du tid med kärleken - 2000
- Lika kära nu som då - 2001-2002
- Min egen ängel - 2002
- Kan du hålla dom orden? - 2006
- En lycklig man - 2008
