= Anne-Lise Seip =

Norwegian historian and former politician

Anne-Lise Seip (born 6 November 1933) is a Norwegian historian and former politician for the Socialist People's Party. A professor emerita at the University of Oslo, she specialized in social history and the history of the welfare state. She was married to the famous historian Jens Arup Seip.

== Career ==
She grew up in Bergen, and finished her secondary education in 1952. She moved to Oslo in 1956 to study at the University of Oslo. She took the cand.philol. degree in 1966, and the dr.philos. degree in 1974 with the thesis Vitenskap og virkelighet, about Torkel Halvorsen Aschehoug.

While studying, she was a member of the Labour Party-affiliated Sosialistisk studentlag. However, she was excluded together with a group from this organization after visiting East Germany. Seip became a member of the Socialist People's Party at its foundation in 1961, and served for some time as a member of Bærum municipal council.

Seip was not hired in an academic position until 1974, when she became associate professor in criminology at the University of Oslo, covering for Tove Stang Dahl who was on a one-year leave. After one year, Seip was hired at the Institute of History. She was promoted to professor in 1985. Her field was modern Norwegian history, specifically social history, and her main works are Om velferdsstatens framvekst (1981), Sosialhjelpstaten blir til. Norsk sosialpolitikk fra 1740 til 1920 (1984) and Veien til velferdsstaten: norsk sosialpolitikk 1920-1975 (1994). She also penned volume eight of Aschehougs Norgeshistorie.

As a professor emerita, she has biographed Johan Sebastian Welhaven in Demringstid. Johan Sebastian Welhaven og nasjonen (2007). She is a member of the Norwegian Academy of Science and Letters and the Royal Danish Academy of Sciences and Letters. From 1974 to 1981 she was a member of Kringkastingsrådet.

== Personal life ==
Seip was married to historian Jens Arup Seip, whom she met as a tutor at the university. The couple had two children, Ingebjørg and Åsmund, both of whom are academics. Jens Arup Seip died in 1992. Seip still lives at Høvik in Bærum.
