= Stefan Borsch =

Swedish singer, songwriter and musician

- Born: Stefan Henrik Borsch; 19 January 1947 (age 79); Hagfors, Sweden
- Occupations: Singer; songwriter; musician
- Years active: 1965–1999
- Musical career
- Genres: Dansband; schlager
- Instruments: Vocals; drums

Stefan Henrik Borsch (born 19 January 1947) is a Swedish singer, songwriter and musician.

At first, he sang for Swedish dansband Öijwinds, and from 1973 for the dansband Vikingarna, which he left in 1979. After this, he began a solo career. He participated at the Swedish Melodifestivalen 1985 with the song "Sjung din sång", which was knocked out in the first round. In parallel to his solo albums he also sang with Anders Engbergs until 1988. The upcoming year he began appearing together with Spotlight, later appearing under the name Stefan Borsch orkester releasing albums until the 1993 band breakup. Between 11 February 1995 and 4 December 1999 he was a member of Keith Elwins orkester. before ending his musical career in 1999.

On 3 July 2004, he made an appearance in the Arvika Park together with Vikingarna during the band's final appearance.

Songs recorded by him include Vid en liten fiskehamn and Den lilla fågeln.

== Discography ==
- Minns att jag finns (1981)
- Ikväll jag tänder ett ljus (1981)
- En liten fågel (1982)
- I sommar (1983)
- Sissi (1984)
- Sjung din sång (1985)
- Adress Rosenhill (1986)
- Dansa en dans med mej (1987)
