= Hans Martin Seip =

Norwegian chemist (born 1937)

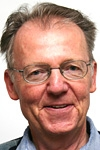
- Hans Martin Seip, 2008
- Born: June 14, 1937 (age 89); Oslo, Norway
- Citizenship: Norwegian
- Education: Norwegian Institute of Technology; University of Oslo
- Known for: Research on acid rain, environmental chemistry, climate co-benefits
- Awards: Member of the Norwegian Academy of Science and Letters; Member of the Royal Norwegian Society of Sciences and Letters
- Scientific career
- Fields: Chemistry, Environmental chemistry
- Workplaces: University of Oslo, CICERO, SINTEF

Hans Martin Seip (born 14 June 1937) is a Norwegian chemist. He is professor emeritus at the University of Oslo and Senior Research Scientist (part-time position) at CICERO.

== Career ==
He was born in Oslo, and became civil engineer at the Norwegian Institute of Technology (NTH- now NTNU) in 1961 and received the dr.philos. degree at the University of Oslo with the thesis Studies on the failure of the first Born approximation in electron diffraction. He was a research fellow at NTH from 1965 to 1969, worked as a university lecturer from 1969 to 1975, researcher at Central Institute for Industrial Research (later SINTEF) from 1976 to 1988. He was appointed professor of chemistry in 1979. Hans Martin Seip is a member of the Norwegian Academy of Science and Letters. and the Royal Norwegian Society of Sciences and Letters.

Seip started his work in chemistry with studies on structural chemistry, later he turned his interests to environmental chemistry. He did several studies, and participated in the scientific debate on acid rain and its impact on forests and waters, during the 1970s and 1980s. There, he emphasized the impact of acid rain on acidification of waters and on fish mortality. However, he was also open to the effects of changing soil quality and the influence of changes in watershed vegetation. The work within this field started in Norway, but was then extended to Poland and China He has subsequently made major contributions to the effects of pollutants on the human population. He is a spokesperson for the importance of co-benefits, that is, abatement measures for climate will also reduce other types of pollutants, like SO_{2}, NOx and particulates. Most of this work has been in China.

== Public services ==
Hans Martin Seip has also participated in the public debate about many issues, mostly on themes related to his research.

== Selected publications ==
- Henriksen, A.; Seip, H.M. (1980). Strong and weak acids in surface waters of southern Norway and southwestern Scotland. SNSF-Project FR17/80. Norway: HEDB. OSTI ID: 6917815.
