= Thore Skogman =

Swedish singer, songwriter, actor and entertainer (1931–2007)

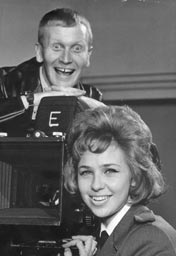
- Thore Skogman and Anita Lindblom 1963.

Background information
- Born: 9 March 1931; Hallstahammar, Sweden
- Origin: Hallstahammar, Sweden
- Died: 9 December 2007 (aged 76) Gävle, Sweden
- Genres: schlager, classical
- Occupations: composer, songwriter, singer, entertainer
- Years active: 1961–2007

Elof Lars Thore Skogman (9 March 1931 – 9 December 2007) was a popular Swedish singer, songwriter, actor and entertainer.

Skogman was born in Hallstahammar, Sweden. While working as an accountant and sales manager during the 1950s, he made his debut recording in 1955, devoted his full-time to singing by 1961, and came third in Sweden's national song contest Melodifestivalen in 1963. In the 1960s he wrote "Fröken Fräken" (literally: Miss Freckle) that became one of his most successful hits. Skogman also wrote songs for other Swedish and Scandinavian artists. Skogman was a familiar and popular fixture in Swedish movies, TV and radio shows, opera and stage performances from the 1960s through the 1980s.

Skogman died at a hospital in Gävle in 2007.

== Selected discography ==
- 1959 – Fullträffar (including Penninggaloppen and Storfiskarvalsen)
- 1965 – Thore Skogman i skivspåret
- 1967 – En sån strålande dag
- 1968 – Opp i varv
- 1970 – Hesa Fredrik och Pelle Propeller
- 1970 – The Old Skogman
- 1971 – Dans på Skogmans loge
- 1972 – Eva Bysing och Thore Skogman på Berns
- 1973 – Led milda ljus
- 1973 – Det glada Liseberg
- 1975 – Det ska gå med musik
- 1980 – Lätt operett
- 1985 – Skogmans jul
- 1991 – En evig sång
- 1997 – Hård-Rock med Thore Skogman
- 2001 – Ljudblommor
- 2008 – Thore goes Metal

== Filmography ==
- 1963 – Tre dar i buren
- 1964 – Tre dar på luffen
- 1965 – Pang i bygget
- 1967 – Hemma hos Thore
- 1967 – En sån strålande dag
- 1968 – Mannen som ikke kunne le

== Selected soundtrack ==
- 1963 – Tre dar i buren
- 1964 – Tre dar på luffen
- 1965 – Pang i bygget
- 1967 – En sån strålande dag
- 1977 – 91:an och generalernas fnatt
- 2001 – Rundt om Rundrejsen 2001
- 2001 – Linie 3 – Rundrejsen 2001

== Well-known songs by Skogman ==
- Ensam jag är (I am lonely)
- Surströmmingspolka (Sour herring polka)
- Tiotusen röda rosor (10,000 red roses)
- Du är en riktig klippare du (You are truly a smart guy)
- Dra ända in i Hälsingland (Go all the way into Hälsingland)
- Penninggaloppen (The money gallop)
- Storfiskarvalsen (The waltz of the great fisher)
- Pop opp i topp (Pop up the top)
- Fröken Fräken (Miss Freckles)
- Twist till menuett (Twist to menuet)
- Kalle Västman från Västmanland (Kalle Västman from Västmanland)
- Min soliga dag (My sunny day)
- Tänk om jag kunde spela dragspel som Calle Jularbo (What if I could play the accordion like Calle Jularbo)
- Gammal kärlek rostar aldrig (Old flames die hard)
- Skinnrock från Malung (Leather jacket from Malung)
- Rött hår och glest mellan tänderna (Redhead with widely spaced teeth)
- Plättlaggen (The pancake pan)
- Även bland törnen finns det rosor (There are roses even among the thorns)
