= Jacob Dahlin =

Swedish broadcaster (1952–1991)

- Born: Hans Jacob Vilhelm Dahlin; 6 June 1952; Västra Sönnarslöv Parish, Scania, Sweden
- Died: 10 October 1991 (aged 39); Stockholm, Sweden
- Occupations: Television presenter; radio presenter
- Years active: 1980–1991

Hans Jacob Vilhelm Dahlin (6 June 1952 — 10 October 1991) was a Swedish TV and radio host.

== Early life ==
Dahlin was born on 6 June 1952 in Västra Sönnarslöv Parish, Scania, Sweden.

== Career ==
He hosted his first radio program Galaxen ("The Galaxy") in the beginning of the 1980s. Guests included Swedish comedian Täppas Fogelberg. He later acted on television shows including Jacobs stege ("Jacob's Ladder") and Caramba!. In almost every episode of Jacobs stege, Dahlin used the catchphrase "Skål, ta mig fan!" ("Cheers, dammit!").

Dahlin studied the Russian language and often reported about happenings in Russian popular culture. He also went to Moscow with his TV-show Jacobs stege, broadcasting with the Russian television show, The Morning Post, with Yury Nikolayev as host. Nikolayev was later invited to Sweden to be on Jacobs stege, and brought with him Russian pop icon Alla Pugacheva.

Pugacheva and Dahlin became friends and she was a frequent guest on his TV-show. One night he had the Soviet and US ambassadors as guests on his TV show, speaking to them fluently in their own languages. Dahlin also recorded with Pugacheva, including the single "Superman" as a duet. The recording led to Pugacheva getting to record her first entire English-language album, Watch Out, which was released in 1985.

Guests on his television show included Diana Ross, Boy George, Princess Stéphanie of Monaco, Janet Jackson, Tina Turner, Cher, Donna Summer, Liza Minnelli, ABBA, Agnetha Fältskog, Benny Andersson, Eros Ramazzotti, Rod Stewart, Matia Bazar, Tommy Körberg, Roxette, Alla Pugacheva, and others.

== Death ==
Dahlin died on 10 October 1991 in Stockholm from an HIV/AIDS-related illness, though his cause of death was not made public until much later. Dahlin was homosexual. While Pugacheva competed in the Eurovision Song Contest in 1997 with her song "Primadonna", she dedicated the song to him, saying "This song is for you, Jacob" in an interview.
