= Hans Kristian Seip (forester) =

Norwegian forester and politician

Hans Kristian Seip (30 June 1920 – 8 October 2012) was a Norwegian forester.

He was born in Molde. He was a professor at the Norwegian College of Agriculture from 1955 to 1966, State Secretary in the Norwegian Ministry of Agriculture from 1966 to 1967 and director in the same ministry from 1967 to 1983. He was a member of the Royal Swedish Academy of Agriculture and Forestry.
