= Didrik Arup Seip =

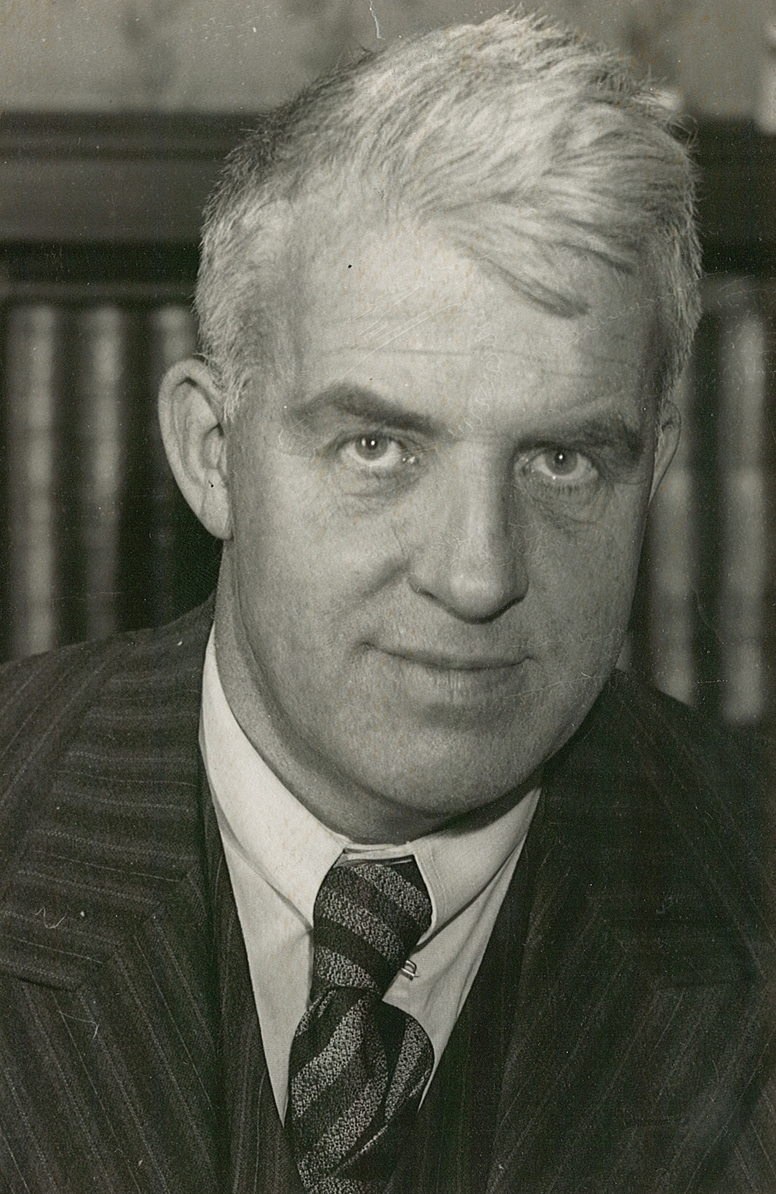
Didrik Arup Seip

Didrik Arup Seip (31 August 1884 – 3 May 1963) was a professor of North Germanic languages at the University of Oslo.

He earned his doctorate (dr.philos.) in 1916 and was appointed professor the same year, retiring in 1954. Together with Herman Jæger, he edited and published the collected works of Henrik Wergeland in 23 volumes (Samlede Skrifter : trykt og utrykt, 1918–1940). From 1937 until 1945, he served as the rector of the university.

Seip was a member of the Administrative Council, the temporary civil government of Norway during German military occupation, in 1940. He was removed from his post as rector of the university in 1941. He was interned by the Nazis at Grini concentration camp, and was later transferred to Sachsenhausen, but was released in 1943 as a direct result of the efforts made by the Swedish explorer Sven Hedin, using Hedin's relations with many high-ranking German Nazi officials, including Hitler. He wrote about his life during the war in his 1946 book: At home and in enemy country.

Even while being held prisoner, Seip carried out official university ceremonies, including the matriculation of some students who also were imprisoned in Germany during the war.

He was an honorary doctor at the University of Hamburg (1938) and at Sorbonne (1945). He obtained the Norwegian Order of St. Olav (1945).

He was also an editorial committee member of Norsk biografisk leksikon.

He was the grandfather of professor of pediatrics Ola Didrik Saugstad.

== Bibliography ==
- Tuneld, John (1981): Didrik Arup Seip: en bibliografi Det Norske Samlaget. ISBN 978-82-521-1872-8

Academic offices
Preceded by Sem Sæland	Rector of the University of Oslo; 1937–1945	Succeeded by Otto Lous Mohr
