= Vikingarna (band) =

Swedish musical group

- Origin: Karlstad, Sweden
- Genres: Dansband
- Years active: 1958–2004; 2016–present
- Labels: EMI; Mariann
- Members: Kenneth Wahlberg; Erik Lihm; Kenth Andersson; Johan Norgren; Martin Lindqvist; Chris Andersen
- Past members: Lasse Westmann; Anders Erixon; Christer Sjögren; Stefan Borsch; Tony Eriksson; Klas Anderhell; Tord Sjöman; Per-Anders Carlsson; Börje Gunnarsson; Lars-Åke Svantesson; Jörgen Arnemar; Lasse Wellander

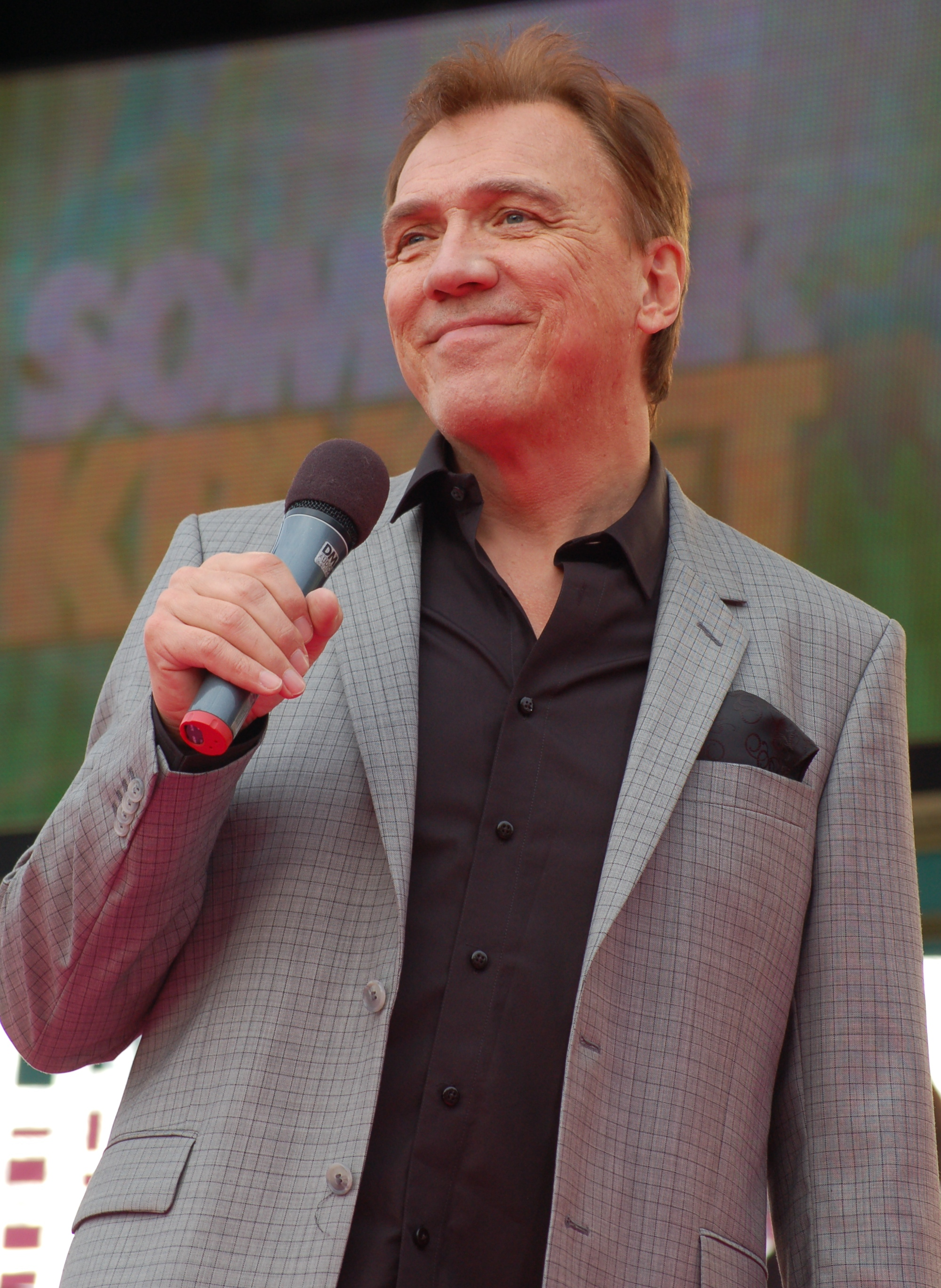
Christer Sjögren

Vikingarna is a Swedish dansband formed in Karlstad in 1958. It is the best-selling dansband, and one of the best-selling artists, in Scandinavia and is often regarded as the greatest dansband to have existed. At the time of its 2004 dissolution it had sold more than 11 million records.

== History ==
=== 1958–1973: Formation and early years ===
In 1958, as skiffle bands were reaching the height of their popularity in Europe, Ji-Coo and the Vikings were formed in Sweden, with Gunnar Olsson on guitar, Hans Axelsson on bass, Egon Olsson on drums, Svante Valjestöl on keyboards, Jens “Ji-Coo” Carlson on saxophone, and Newman Alexander on trumpet. The band did not have a lead singer at first, but after a series of auditions, Kerstin Larsson was hired for the job. The band became a local hit, and in 1961, they were given a shot at recording their first EP, Viking Boogie, which entered the Top 20 charts on Radio Luxembourg. However, the lack of a real breakthrough became a struggle for many of the members, and by the end of 1961 the band had split into two groups: those who wanted to continue, and those who didn't. As Carlsson resigned, the band was renamed The Vikings.

The newformed band soon found popularity once again and began touring the country, playing dance halls and other venues. They went through several member changes, rarely having a steady line-up for more than a year or two, eventually going through a total of twenty-four members by 1973. Notably however, two of the members arriving in the early 1960s would remain for many years: saxophonist Tony Eriksson and guitarist Jörgen Arnemar. In 1963, they recorded a cover of country standard "The Tennessee Waltz", selling 20,000 copies locally but falling short of any real success. By the mid-60s the band had gradually changed their style to dansband, a new style of schlager music that was gaining popularity in Sweden and Scandinavia.

With a final set of changes in 1973, the band consisted of Jörgen Arnemar (guitar), Börje Gunnarson (bass guitar), Per-Anders Carlsson (drums), Tord Sjöman (piano, organ, vocals), Tony Eriksson (saxophone and keyboards), Christer Linde (trumpet) and, completing the line-up, lead singer Stefan Borsch, who had joined the year before.

But as the band entered the 1970s, they had yet to make a record, much to the nuisance of several members. With the idea of creating a low-cost demo, guitarist Jörgen Arnemar brought a tape recorder to one the band's rehearsals and left it recording, filling a reel of magnetic tape with a run-through of their repertoire. The reel was then sent to EMI Odeon, who were impressed with what they heard, and offered the band to record a volume of Det Går Som En Dans, a series of records featuring lesser known dansbands. However, when the contract arrived for them to sign, a secretary had mistakenly translated their name from "the Vikings" to "Vikingarna". Afraid to compromise the opportunity, the band decided to keep the "new" name. Following a brief set of recording sessions, the record entered Svensktoppen in 1974, with the song "På världens tak", a Swedish-language cover of The Carpenters hit "Top of the World", becoming their first hit single.

=== 1974–1977: Breakthrough ===
After the success with their first album the year prior, Vikingarna soon recorded and released their second album, Här kommer Vikingarna. However, it failed to break charts, and the band was released from their record deal with EMI Odeon, as the company saw them as "just another dansband". It would, however, not be many weeks until the band was signed again, this time by newly formed Swedish record company Mariann Records. Returning to recording, their big break-through came the following year, with "Du gav bara löften", their second major hit single, and first number one. The same year, the band achieved their first gold record for their album Kramgoa Låtar 1 in Sweden, as well as a silver record in Norway. In the years after, the band continued recording and releasing new albums, spawning several hits throughout the seventies, while at the same time doing very successful tours throughout Sweden and Scandinavia.

=== 1977–1992: Change of members and success ===
In 1977, drummer Per-Anders Carlsson left the band as he felt the success had outgrown him, and he was replaced by experienced drummer Anders Erixon, who had been the band's drummer in the late sixties. The year after, the band recorded an English-language album titled Export as an attempt to receive international recognition but without success. Later that year, just as the band was finishing yet another tour following their latest album, Kramgoa Låtar 6, lead singer Stefan Borsch announced his departure to focus on a solo career. This came as a shock to the band, who were having greater success than ever at the time. Borsch would later state in interviews that he regretted leaving the band at that point, and several times considered going back in the following years. Hired to replace him was Christer Sjögren, a skilled yet unknown vocalist, who would stay as the band's singer for the rest of their career. The band soon recorded and released their ninth album, Kramgoa Låtar 7, including a Swedish cover of "Dschingis Khan", the West German entry to the Eurovision Song Contest in 1979. In 1980, bass guitarist Börje Gunnarsson left the band, and was replaced with Lars-Åke Svantesson, who in addition to playing the bass guitar, would co-produce the band's albums for the next eight years.

Continuing their heavy schedule of touring and recording into the 1980s, the band gradually began to gain fame outside the Swedish borders. Already established in Norway and some parts of Denmark, the band soon expanded their tours to include all of Scandinavia, quickly becoming the most popular and best selling dansband ever. For most of the 1980s and 1990s, Vikingarna's music and repertoire was often seen as a standard for the dansband sound by music fans around Scandinavia. As the band began work on Kramgoa Låtar 13 in 1985, longtime guitarist Jörgen Arnemar announced his retirement from touring and recording, instead focusing on managing the band, a job he held until their disbanding. He was replaced by experienced dansband musician Erik Lihm, a previous associate of Sjögren. Kramgoa Låtar 13 saw the band's first ever release in the Soviet Union, selling 40 000 copies. The band would later become the first Scandinavian act to perform in the country. Throughout the eighties, the band kept going at a now well-established formula. They would record and mix an album during winter, release it during spring, before following with a six-month tour to support it. The band and their associates would then be writing new material during touring, and repeat the formula. From 1979 to 1992, they released one album every year, following this schedule.

In 1988, bass guitarist Lars-Åke "Svante" Svantesson stopped touring and performing after suffering from a spinal disc herniation that impaired his ability to play. He continued, however, to assist with the recording and production of albums until 2004. Kenth Andersson, formerly of Erik Lihms band, replaced him on short notice as he happened to be available, but soon became a permanent member. Two years later, after almost thirty years with the band, longtime band leader, pianist and occasional lead vocalist Tord Sjöman decided to retire from the music industry. His departure saw a change of instruments in the band, as guitarist Erik Lihm took over the keyboards, while long-time studio musician and renowned guitarist Lasse Westmann joined the band as their permanent guitarist, having already performed on their albums since the early 1980s. The band kept recording and touring throughout the member changes, and in 1988 and 1991 they were awarded Grammis prizes. Continuing their success into the 1990s, the band recorded what would be their final album for several years in 1992, entitled Kramgoa Låtar 20, before going on a three-year break. During this time, several of the members began solo projects and started new bands, the most successful being singer Christer Sjögren, who had already established himself in Scandinavia as a solo artist.

=== 1995–2004: Return to recording, tragedy and retirement ===
In 1995, the band once again returned to the studio and recorded a new album entitled Kramgoa Låtar 1995, a modernization of their album name gimmick, and it achieved a platinum record in both Sweden and Norway within two weeks of its release. It also gave the band their first hit record in Finland. This prompted the band to resume touring in Scandinavia, and two years later they returned to the studio to record their next album, Kramgoa Låtar 1997. However, just as the band was putting the finishing touches on the album, long-time drummer Anders Erixon died suddenly on 4 August 1997, at 53 years old. At the time of his death, he had completed all of the drum tracks for the new album, and was on a brief holiday before touring was to start. Singer Christer Sjögren would later iterate that Erixon was the core of the band, keeping them together when everyone else was tired, and that his death nearly broke up the band. Studio drummer Klas Anderhaal, who had played with Erixon previously, joined the band as his replacement. The band then continued touring and recording for several more years, releasing new albums on a semi-yearly basis, while playing to sold-out crowds throughout Scandinavia.

In 2000, Vikingarna expanded their horizons and began to record songs in German, under the name "Vikinger", the German translation of "Vikingarna". They became immensely popular in Germany, Switzerland and Austria, even having several TV appearances in the former country. The band recorded two more albums in German, both becoming best-sellers. In late 2003, Klas Anderhaal left the band to resume his career as a studio musician, and was replaced by drummer Johan Norgren, known for his unusual habit of playing barefooted. At the same time, the band announced that they were doing a farewell tour the following year, and that the band would retire for good afterwards. Not long after, on 30 January 2004, the band's guitarist Lasse Westmann died suddenly, only a few weeks after being given a clean bill of health after a lengthy battle with cancer. The treatment had, however, weakened his immune system, and he died from pneumonia. The band recruited his colleague and friend Lasse Wellander to fill his shoes on their farewell tour. In June 2004, the band appeared on Swedish hit television show Allsång på Skansen, in what would be one of the most viewed episodes in the series' history. The band played their final concert in their founding town of Arvika on 3 July 2004, in front of more than 7,000 people, breaking the record for most attendants at the site, with both Christer Sjögren and Stefan Borsch appearing. At the same time, a "Greatest Hits" compilation album, which spanned most of the band's career featuring newly recorded versions of several old hits, was released. A documentary-concert film titled Kramgött från början till slut was released at the same time, featuring old clips and historical interviews, mixed with recent live footage. At the time of their 2004 dissolution, Vikingarna had sold over 11 million records.

=== 2004–2016: After retirement ===
In 2008, four years after their retirement, their final concert was released on both CD and DVD. Since then, most of the members had remained active with their individual solo projects. On 18 March 2011, lead singer Christer Sjögren announced to Swedish and Norwegian news that the band were planning a comeback tour, with the first concert scheduled for 7 July at Ekebofestivalen in Sweden. He also told reporters that several new songs had been written, and that a new album featuring these was in the works. Sjögren, along with keyboard player Erik Lihm, are the only two members of the former line-up who are returning, with the remainder of the line-up being filled by the members of Erik Lihm's own band. Due to the nature of the comeback, Sjögren and Lihm have refused to use the Vikingarna name, as they consider it to be a separate project. The other former members of the band has since retired, but saxophonist Tony Eriksson stated in a 2012 interview that he "would love to return to Vikingarna, if the time and place is right", fueling rumours of a pending comeback tour, marking the 40th anniversary of the group's first album release.

=== 2016–present: New era ===
The band made a one-time reunion for the Swedish television show Tack för dansen (Thank You for the Dance), about dansbands and their career. The final line-up from 2004 took part, joined by Stefan Borsch. Christer Sjögren stated that he saw Vikingarna as a finished chapter, but that he did not see future reunions as unlikely. Later in the year, it was revealed that the band would be reformed as Nya Vikingarna (the New Vikings), with three of the members of the former line-up, Kenneth Wahlberg taking over as the vocalist, and Sjögren making occasional guest appearances. Their first gigs as a new act took place in January 2017 aboard a Birka Line cruise ship.

== Personnel ==
1958–1973	Fleeting members changes with little record.
1973–1977	Stefan Borsch — vocals; Per Anders Carlsson – drums, percussion; Börje Gunnarson – bass guitar; Tord Sjöman – keyboards, accordion; Jörgen Arnemar – guitars
1977–1978	Stefan Borsch - vocals; Tony Eriksson - keyboards, saxophone; Anders Erixson - drums, percussion; Börje Gunnarson - bass guitar; Tord Sjöman - keyboards, accordion; Jörgen Arnemar - guitars
1978–1980	Christer Sjögren - vocals, guitars; Tony Eriksson - keyboards, saxophone; Anders Erixson - drums, percussion; Börje Gunnarson - bass guitar; Tord Sjöman - keyboards, accordion; Jörgen Arnemar - guitars
1980–1984	Christer Sjögren - vocals, guitars; Tony Eriksson - keyboards, saxophone; Anders Erixson - drums, percussion; Lars-Åke Svantesson - bass guitar; Tord Sjöman - keyboards, accordion; Jörgen Arnemar - guitars
1984–1988	Christer Sjögren - vocals, guitars; Tony Eriksson - keyboards, saxophone; Anders Erixson - drums, percussion; Lars-Åke Svantesson - bass guitar; Tord Sjöman - keyboards, accordion; Erik Lihm - guitars
1988–1990	Christer Sjögren - vocals, guitars; Tony Eriksson - keyboards, saxophone; Anders Erixson - drums, percussion; Kenth Andersson - bass guitar; Tord Sjöman - keyboards, accordion; Erik Lihm - guitars
1990–1997	Christer Sjögren - vocals, guitars; Tony Eriksson - keyboards, saxophone; Anders Erixson - drums, percussion; Kenth Andersson - bass guitar; Erik Lihm - keyboards, accordion; Lasse Westmann - guitars
1997–January 2004	Christer Sjögren - vocals, guitars; Tony Eriksson - keyboards, saxophone; Klas Anderhell - drums, percussion; Kenth Andersson - bass guitar; Erik Lihm - keyboards, accordion; Lasse Westmann - guitars
January–July 2004 + one-time reunion 2016	Christer Sjögren - vocals, guitars; Tony Eriksson - keyboards, saxophone; Johan Norgren - drums, percussion; Kenth Andersson - bass guitar; Erik Lihm - keyboards, accordion; Lasse Wellander - guitars
2016 –	Kenneth Wahlberg - vocals; Martin Lindqvist - saxophone; Johan Norgren - drums, percussion; Kenth Andersson - bass guitar; Erik Lihm - keyboards; Chris Andersen - guitars

== Discography ==
=== Studio releases ===
==== With EMI/Odeon ====
- Det går som en dans 5 (1973)
- Här kommer Vikingarna (1974)

==== With Mariann Records ====
- Kramgoa låtar 1 (1975)
- Kramgoa låtar 2 (1975)
- Kramgoa låtar 3 (1976)
- "På världens tak" (1976) Re-release of the lesser known "Det går som en dans 5" from 1973.
- Kramgoa låtar 4 (1977)
- Kramgoa låtar 5 (1977)
- The Vikings Export (1978)
- Kramgoa låtar 6 (1978)
- Kramgoa låtar 7 - Djingis Khan (1979)
- Greatest Hits (1979)
- Vikingarnas julparty (1979)
- Kramgoa låtar 8 - Mot alla vindar (1980)
- Kramgoa låtar 9 - Hallå Västindien (1981)
- Kramgoa låtar 10 - Den stora dagen (1982)
- Kramgoa låtar 11 - Save Your Love (1983)
- Kramgoa låtar 12 - Albatross (1984)
- Kramgoa låtar 13 (1985)
- Julens sånger (1985)
- Kramgoa låtar 14 (1986)
- Kramgoa låtar 15 (1987)

==== With EMI/NMG ====
- Kramgoa låtar 16 (1988)
- Instrumental Hits 1 (1988)
- Kramgoa låtar 17 (1989)
- Kramgoa låtar 18 (1990)
- Kramgoa låtar 19 (1991)
- Gitarrgodingar (1991)
- Kramgoa låtar 20 (1992)
- Kramgoa låtar 1995 (1995)
- Kramgoa låtar 1997 (1997)
- Kramgoa låtar 1998 (1998)
- Kramgoa låtar 1999 (1999)
- Laulava sydän (1999)
- Kuschel dich in meine Arme/Vikinger (2000)
- Kramgoa låtar 2000 (2000)
- Kramgoa låtar 2001 (2001)
- Tanz mit mir/Vikinger (2001)
- Kramgoa låtar 2002 (2002)
- Romantica/Vikinger (2002)

=== Live albums ===
- Den sista dansen (2008); also released as a live DVD

=== Compilations ===
- På begäran (1990)
- Vikingarna Gold (1993)
- 100% Vikingarna (2000)
- Vore danske favoriter (2000)
- Best of Vikinger (2003)
- 100% guldfavoriter (2003)
- Bästa kramgoa låtarna (2004)
- Bästa (2006)
- Danske hits (2006)
- Bästa kramgoa låtarna 2 (2007)
