= Guld & glöd =

Live album by Sven-Ingvars
- Released: 14 August 2002
- Recorded: Tyrol, Stockholm, 12 April 2002
- Genre: dansband music, rock
- Label: Frituna
- Producer: Martin Hansen, Mikael Nord Andersson

Sven-Ingvars chronology
Retroaktiv (2000)	Guld & glöd (2002)	Livet är nu (2005)

Guld & glöd is a Sven-Ingvars live album released on 14 August 2002, recorded at Tyrol in Stockholm on 12 April 2002.

== Track listing ==
1. Intro; Nio liv (P. Jonsson)
2. Medley: Lika ung som då, Gamla polare (N. Strömstedt; B. Månson)
3. Högt i det blå (P. Gessle)
4. Diana (P. Anka)
5. Rock & roll-medley (M. Freedman, J. Deknight, B. Bryant, D. Watson, trad., D. Covay, J. Berry, J. Leiber, M. Stoller)
6. Det kommer från hjärtat (P. Fransson, P. Karlsson)
7. Te dans mä Karlstatösera (R. Lindström, E. Uppström)
8. Fröken Fräken (T. Skogman)
9. En prästkrage i min hand (G. Rybrant, O. Thiel)
10. Ett litet rött paket (O. Thörnqvist)
11. Önskebrunnen (R. Wallebom)
12. Luffarvisa (M. Nilsson)
13. Kristina från Vilhelmina (R. Wallebom)
14. Det var dans bort i vägen (G. Fröding, H. Lambert)
15. Anita (G. Fröding, S.-E. Magnusson)
16. Marie, Marie (S. Hellstrand)
17. Två mörka ögon (B. Månson)
18. Akustiskt medley (I. Hellberg, R. Wallebom, J. Waard, L. Berghagen, D.A. Winter, C. Desage, K. Lindén)
19. Min gitarr (T. Skogman, S.-E. Magnusson)
20. Så många mil, så många år (D. Hylander)
21. Jag ringer på fredag (I. Hellberg)
22. Byns enda blondin (N. Strömstedt)
23. Kyss mej stilla (P. LeMarc)
24. Torparrock (G. Johansson)
25. Börja om från början (R. Wallebom)
26. Någon att hålla i hand (C. Thomas, T. Connor, A. Forss)
27. När rocken kom till byn (P. Bäckman, S.-E. Magnusson)
28. Juninatten (T. Styffe, S.-E. Magnusson)

== Charts ==
Chart (2002–2003)	Peak position
Norway (VG-lista)	12
Sweden (Sverigetopplistan)	2
