= List of motorways in Sweden =

Motorväg road sign

Sweden has a fairly limited system of motorways (motorväg in Swedish). The first motorway (Malmö–Lund) was opened in 1953. The motorways' primary purpose is connecting major cities to their surrounding areas, although there is a long-term ambition to connect Stockholm, Gothenburg and Malmö with motorways.

With the completion of a couple of new motorway stretches in 2006 - 2015, an interconnecting motorway network exists from Öresund Bridge (to Denmark) to the Swedish- Norwegian border and to Gävle, north of Stockholm.

There are also a number of motortrafikleder (semi-motorways, autostrasse), roads with only 2 or 3 (2+1) lanes but to which the same conditions apply as to motorways (i.e. grade-separated crossings, no slow traffic). These can be converted to motorways by adding a parallel road.

This is a complete listing of motorways in Sweden. The Swedish road numbering scheme does not distinguish between motorways and other types of roads.

The speed limit on motorways is generally 110 or 120 km/h (68 or 75 mph). Speed limits of 70 and 90 km/h are often used on urban motorways, and electronic signs can show a lower limit in bad weather.

== List of current motorways ==
Map of Swedish motorways

- E4 Helsingborg – Ljungby – Jönköping – Linköping – Norrköping – Stockholm – Uppsala – Gävle
  - Gävle – Bergby is a 2+1 semi-motorway
  - Söderhamn – Hudiksvall is a 2+2 road but signed as a semi-motorway
  - Njurunda - Sundsvall – Bergeforsen
  - Piteå – Norrfjärden
- E6 (car ferries from Travemunde, Rostock, Sassitz and Świnoujście) outside Trelleborg with its large ferry harbour around Maglarp – Malmö – Halmstad – Gothenburg – Uddevalla – Svinesund – (Norway)
- E18 Segmon – Ed
  - Karlstad – Skattkärr
  - Lekhyttan – Örebro – Köping – Västerås – Järva krog
  - Bergshamra – Rosenkälla
  - Rosenkälla – Söderhall is a 2+1 semi-motorway
  - Söderhall – Norrtälje
- E20 (Denmark) – Öresund Bridge – Malmö – Halmstad – Gothenburg – Tollered
  - Ingared - Alingsås
  - Lundsbrunn - Holmestad
  - Vretstorp – Arboga
  - Eskilstuna – Strängnäs – Stockholm
- E22 Maglarp – Malmö – Lund – Fogdarp
  - Fogdarp – Hörby is a 2+1 semi-motorway
  - Hörby – Mörrum
  - Nättraby – Karlskrona
  - Kalmar
- E45 Together with E18 Segmon – Ed, Sweden
  - Surte – Göta
  - Lilla Edet – Trollhättan
- E65 Malmö – Tittente
- 11 Malmö Bulltofta – Trafikplats-Sunnanå
- 25 and 30 Öjaby – Växjö center
- 28 Karlskrona Österleden
- 34 Linköping Trafikplats Tift (E4 Linköping västra) – Vallarondellen "Malmslättsleden"
- 35 Linköping Trafikplats Staby (E4 Linköping östra) – Mörtlösarondellen
- 40 Gothenburg – Borås – Ulricehamn
  - Through Haga in Jönköping
- 44 Herrestad near Uddevalla – east parts of Uddevalla (old E6)
  - Råsseröd east of Uddevalla – Väne-Ryr (extension to road 45 opened during 2006)
- 49 Skara - Axvall
- 50 Together with E20 Brändåsen (Hallsberg) – Norrplan (Örebro)
- 53 Oxelösund – Nyköping
- 73 Älgesta – Stockholm
- 75 Stockholm Södra länken
- 80 Gävle – Sandviken
- 222 Henriksdal – Graninge
- 226 Årsta – Östberga
- 229 Skarpnäck – Bollmora
- 260 Älta – Skrubba
- 265 Norrortsleden E4 – Sollentuna
- 273 E4 – Arlanda airport

=== Motorways without numbers ===
The numbers of these roads belong to secondary categories that do not appear on signs and regular maps:

- North of Helsingborg
- Inre Ringvägen in Malmö, former E6/E20
- Out of Malmö to E22
- Out of Malmö to E6/E22
- "Saltsjöbadsleden" in Nacka

Note that there are more semi-motorways in Sweden, but they have not been considered interesting, since those do not connect to motorways.

== Long-term goals ==
There are long-term goals in the standard of the major roads, and all new constructed roads should follow this target standard. This target has varied over the years, therefore roads vary somewhat randomly in standard. A bad road has been rebuilt to the target standard of the time, while better roads have been kept as is, even though they did not fulfill the target standard. This is especially noticeable on the E18.

- E4

Gävle-Haparanda: probably narrower motorway or semi-motorway all the way. Dual carriageways close to some cities. The existing semi-motorways will mostly be kept.

- E6

Motorway all the way, finished in 2015.

- E18

Segmon-Norrtälje: motorway all the way, maybe some semi-motorway in Värmland. Norway-Segmon: semi-motorwaylike with some crossings in level.

- E20

Gothenburg-Vara: motorway
Vara-Vretstorp: either motorway or semi-motorway.
Vretstorp-Stockholm: motorway

- E22

Trelleborg-Karlskrona: motorway. The existing semi-motorways within Blekinge will be kept, but those within Skåne are planned to be rebuilt.
Karlskrona-Söderköping: 2+1 semi-motorway, but it will take long time before it is built.
Söderköping-Norrköping: motorway

- 40

Gothenburg-Ulricehamn: motorway
Ulricehamn-Jönköping: semi-motorway. Since 2015 there are dual carriageways all the way with several crossings in level, which are planned to be rebuilt on long term.

== Electric vehicles ==
Sweden, which has pioneered electrified roads through several pilot projects including the world's first temporary electric road, will turn the E20 into a permanent electrified road, the first of its kind in the world. Jan Pettersson, Director of Strategic Development at Trafikverket, the Swedish transport administration, said: "We think the electrification solution is the way forward for decarbonising the transport sector and we are working with a number of solutions."

== Gallery ==
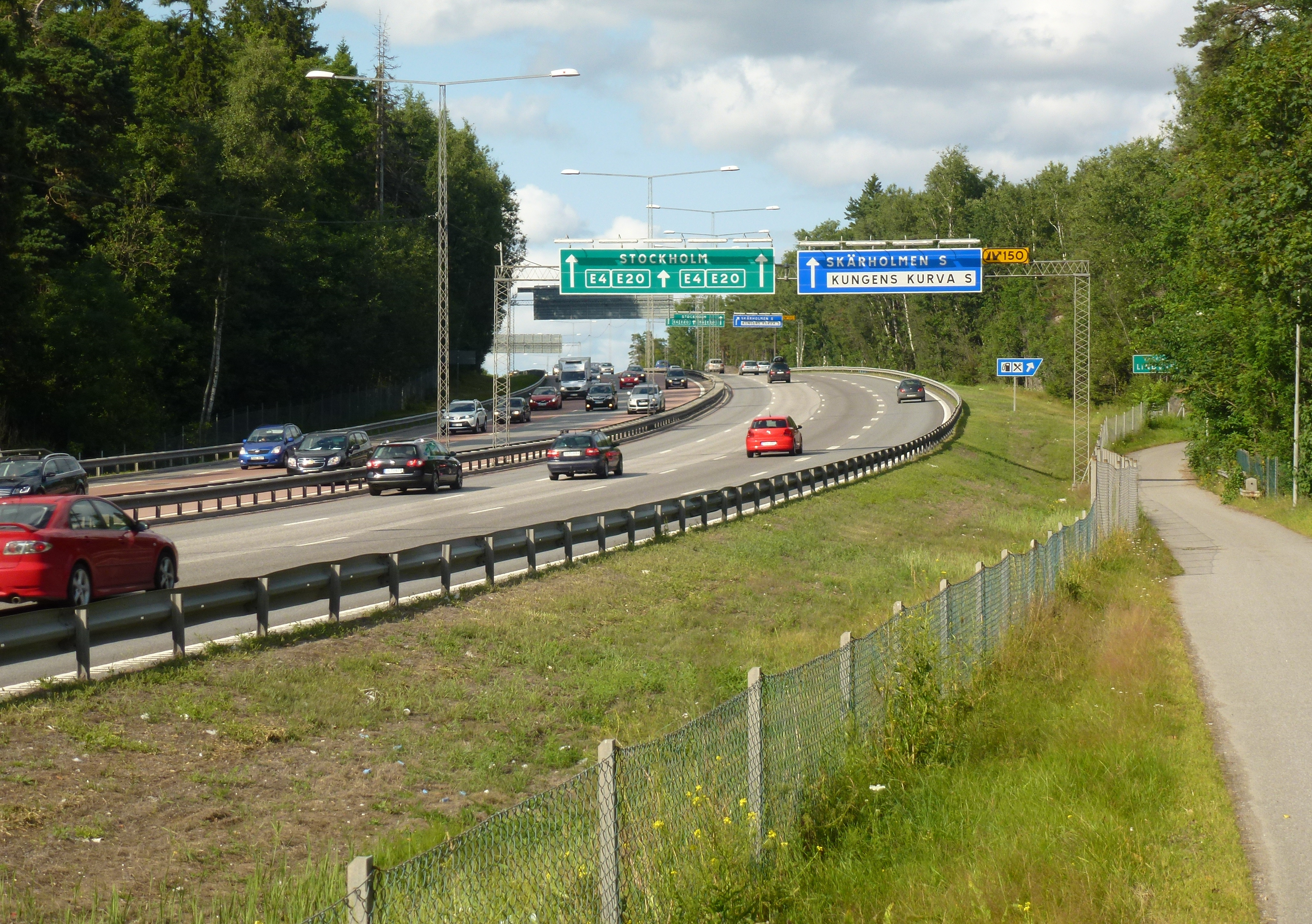
E4 motorway in Vårby south of Stockholm

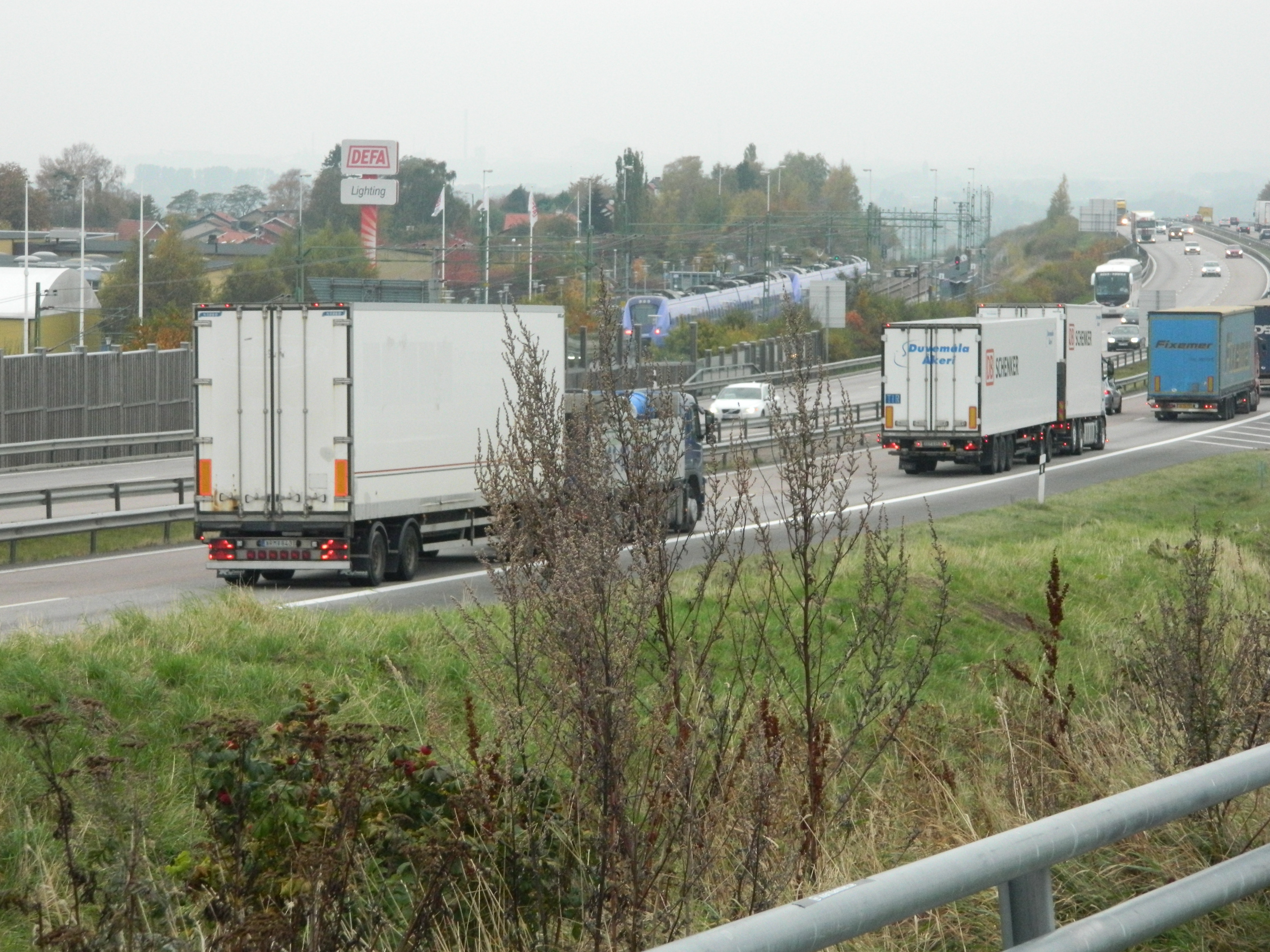
Motorway E6 in Scania

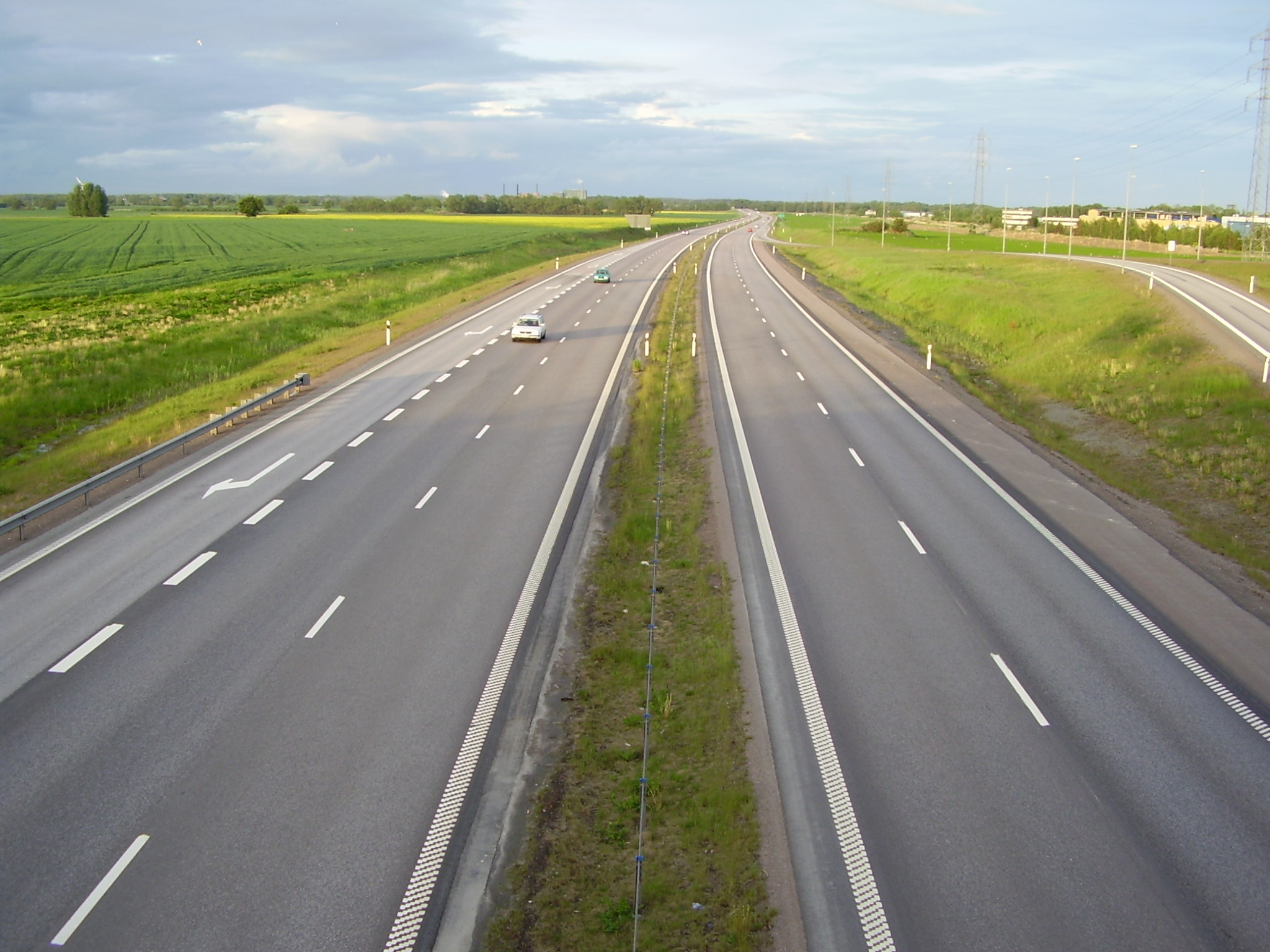
E4 at Linköping

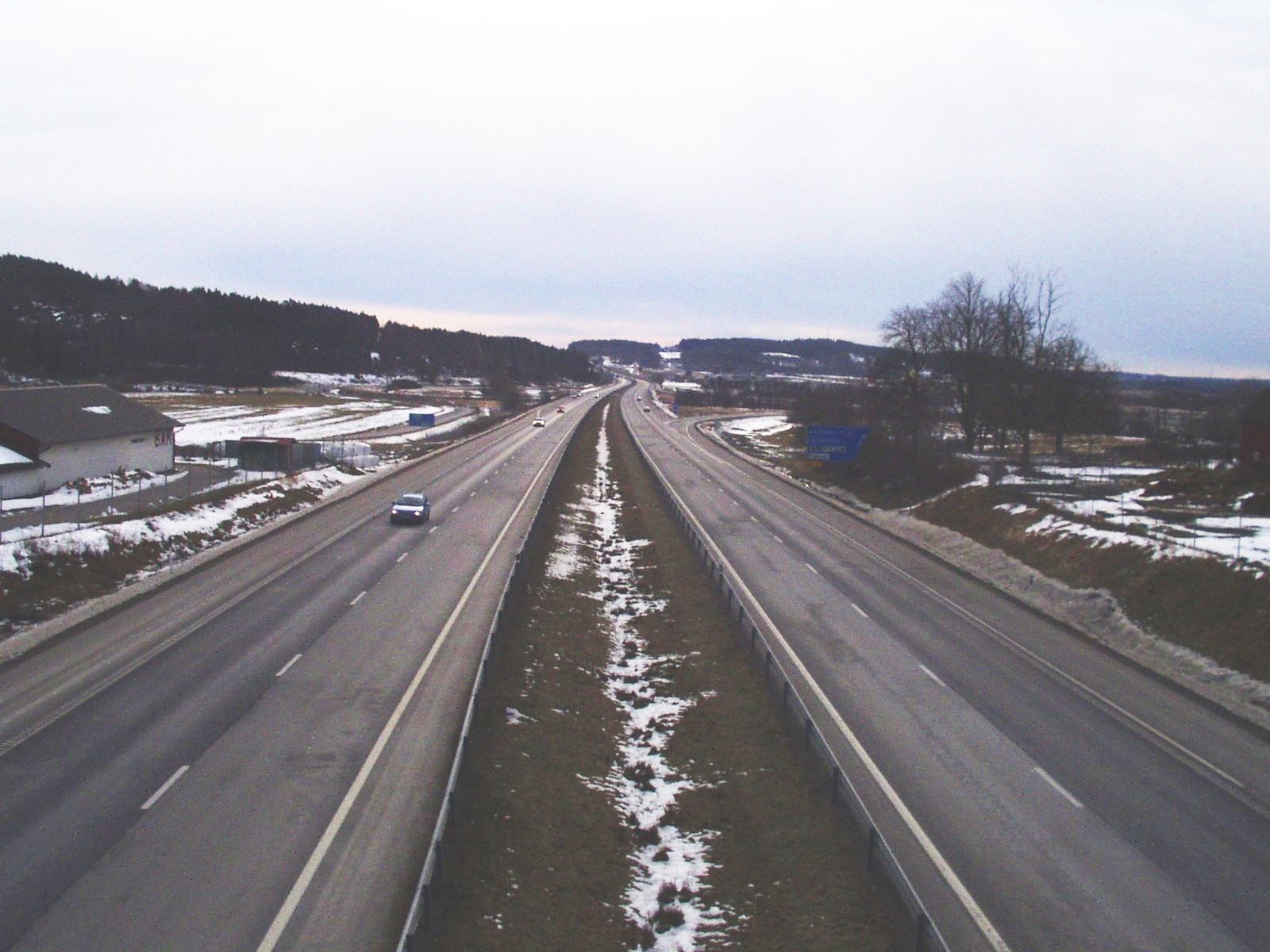
E6 and E20 near Varberg

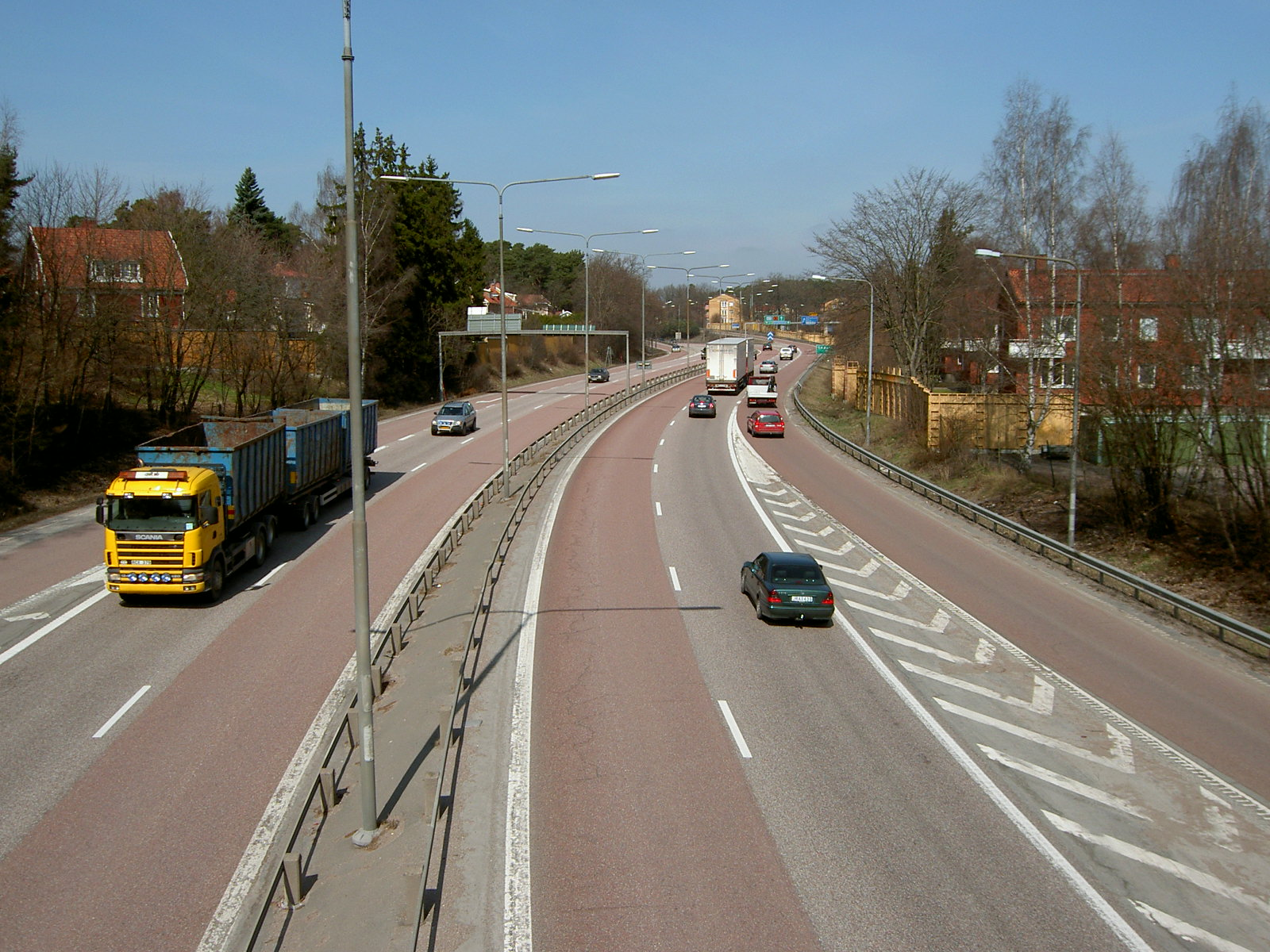
E18 in Västerås

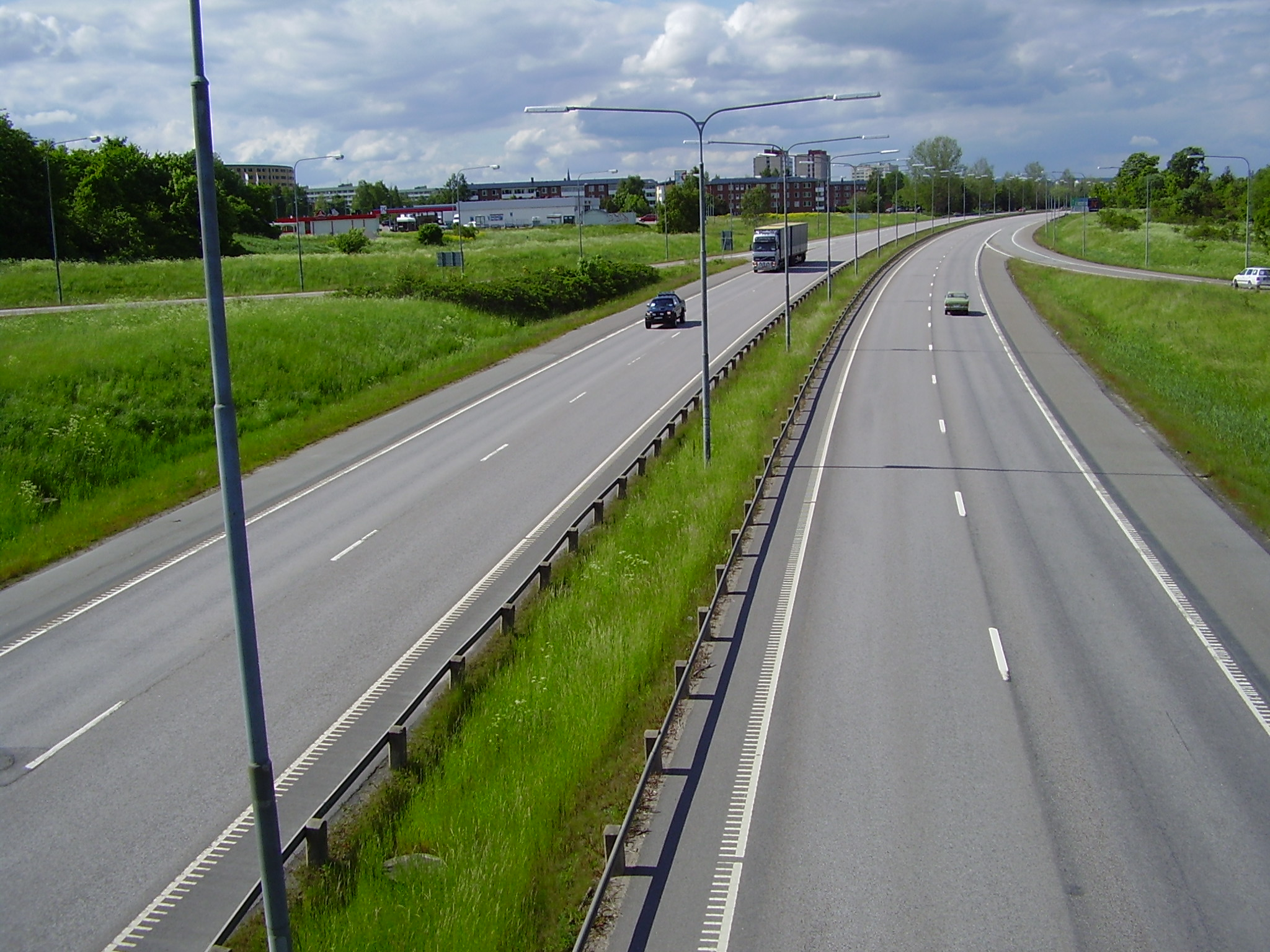
E22 (Söderköpingsvägen) in Norrköping

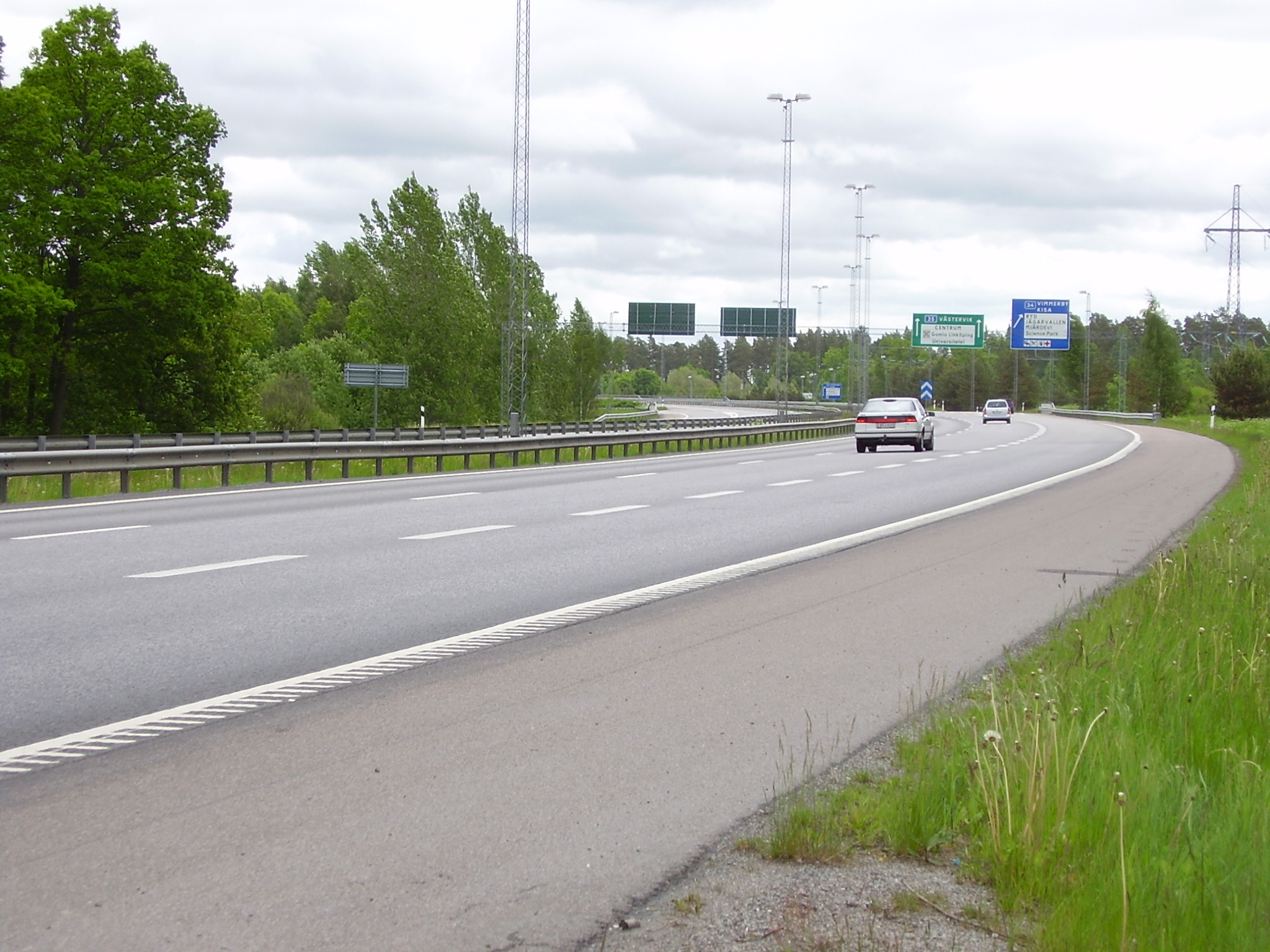
34 and 36 in Linköping

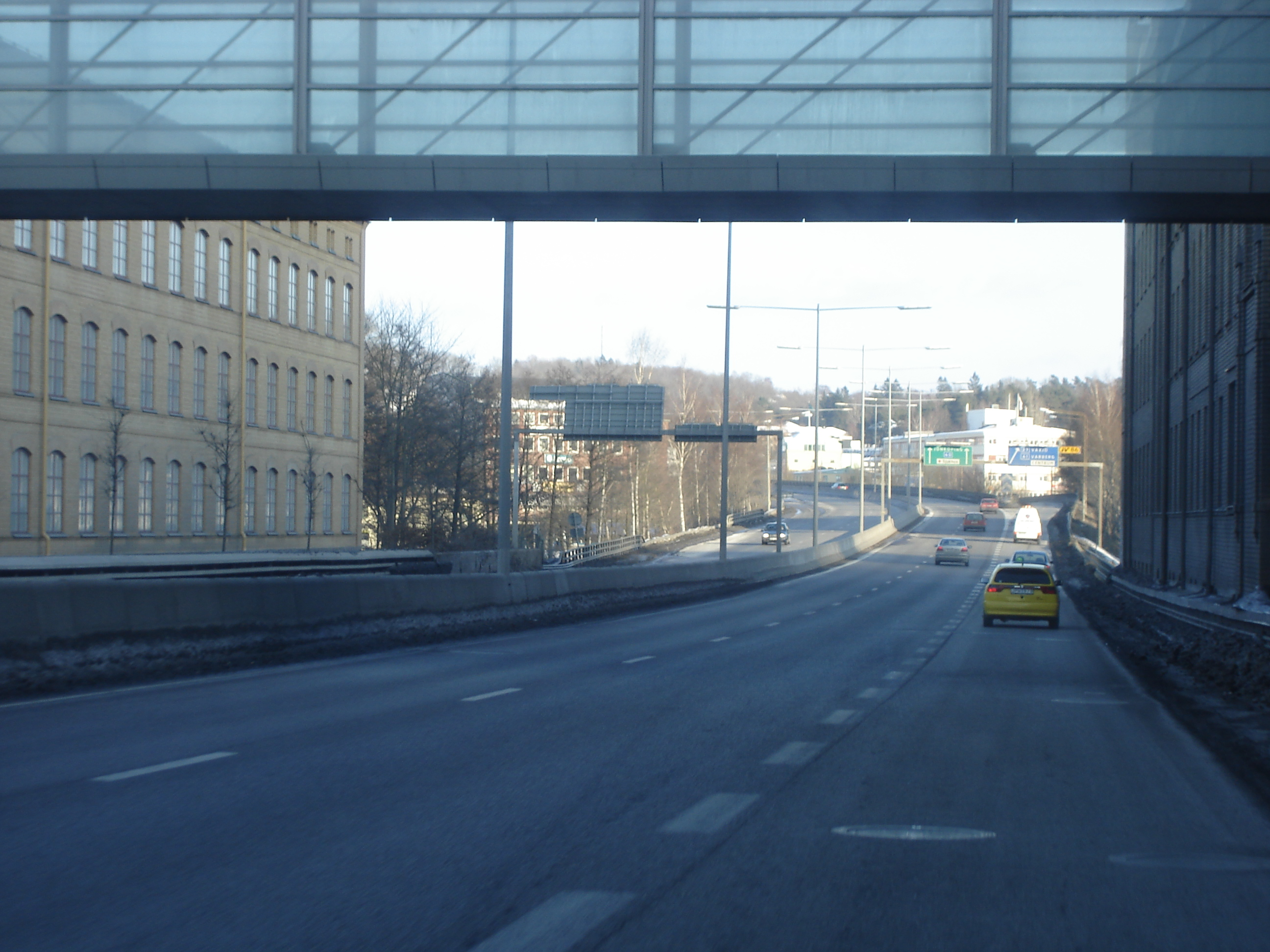
40 through Borås

== See also ==
- Transportation in Sweden
- List of controlled-access highway systems
- Evolution of motorway construction in European nations
