= Playa blanca =

1976 studio album by Sven-Ingvars

Studio album by Sven-Ingvars
- Released: 1976
- Recorded: 18–22 October 1976
- Studio: Marcus Music, Solna
- Genre: Pop
- Label: Philips
- Producer: Göte Wilhelmson

Sven-Ingvars chronology
Guld (1975)	Playa blanca (1976)	Åh, vad skönt (1977)

Playa blanca is a 1976 Sven Ingvars studio album. In 1993, it was rereleased as CD.

== Track listing ==
1. Playa blanca – Alric Simone, Stan Regal, Åke Strömmer
2. Farväl till sommaren – Lasse Berghagen
3. Number One – Billy Swan, Marlu Swan
4. Alpens ros – trad
5. Leende guldbruna ögon (Beautiful Brown EyesLeende guldbruna ögon) – Alton Delmore, Athur Simon, Olle Bergman
6. Sen jag mötte dig (Smoke Gets in Your Eyes) – Jerome Kern, Lars-E. Karlsson
7. Stina kom till mit party – Mats Wickén
8. Försök förlåta mej – Rune Wallebom
9. När solen färgar juninatten – Sven-Erik Magnusson, Torleif Styffe
10. Rock and Roll Music – Chuck Berry
11. Per spelman – trad. Norwegian folksong
12. En hård värld (Wild World) – Cat Stevens, Hawkey Franzén
13. Aj, aj, Maria (Maria de bahia) – Paul Misraki, Roland

=== 1993 bonus tracks ===
1. Dansen går fru Andersson – Sven-Erik Magnusson, Per Levin
2. En sådan sommar får vi aldrig mer igen – Torleif Styffe, Leif Nygren
3. Du är just den jag vill ha (I Can't Keep My Hands Off You) – Freddie Hart, Sven Olof Bagge
4. Jag har e litta jänte – trad.
5. Tur i kärlek (Good Luck Charm) – Aaron Schroeder, Wally Gold, Olle Bergman
6. Räkna aldrig någon tår – Robert Malmberg, Sven Olof Bagge

== Charts ==
Chart (1976–1977)	Peak position
Swedish Albums (Sverigetopplistan)	18
