= Sommar =

Sommar (Swedish for summer) may refer to:

- Sommar (radio program)
- Hej hej sommar, a Swedish television program
- Idas sommarvisa (also known as Du ska inte tro det blir sommar)
- Sommar i Sverige, a song by Sven-Ingvars
- Sommar och syndare, a 1960 film
- One Summer of Happiness, original title Hon dansade en sommar
- Sune's Summer, original title Sunes sommar
- Ingen sommar utan reggae, a song by Markoolio
- Midsommar (film), a 2019 horror film
