= Sträck ut din hand =

Studio album by Lasse Berghagen
- Released: 1995

Lasse Berghagen chronology
På begäran (1991)	Sträck ut din hand (1995)	Inte bara drömmar (1997)

Sträck ut din hand ("Stretch Out Your Hand") is a 1995 album by Lasse Berghagen.

== Songs ==
- 1.Sträck ut din hand ("Stretch Out Your Hand")
- 2.Låt oss rigga en skuta ("Let's Rig a Boat")
- 3.Då är du aldrig ensam ("Then You're Never Alone")
- 4.Till Bohuslän ("Towards Bohuslän")
- 5.Låt mej få ge dej min sång ("Let Me Give You My Song")
- 6.I mina blommiga sandaler ("In My Floral Sandals")
- 7.Nils
- 8.Stockholm i mitt hjärta ("Stockholm In My Heart")
- 9.En morgon av lycka ("A Morning of Luck")
- 10.Stäng inte dörr'n ("Don't Close the Door")
- 11.Res med mej uppför floden ("Travel With Me Up the River")
- 12.Farväl till sommaren ("Farewell To the Summer")
- 13.Du vandrar som oftast allena ("You Walk as Often Alone")

== Charts ==
Chart (1995)	Peak position
Swedish Albums (Sverigetopplistan)	25
