= Berghagen =

Berghagen is a surname. Notable people with the surname include:

- Lasse Berghagen (1945–2023), Swedish singer and songwriter
- Malin Berghagen (born 1966), Swedish actress and singer
