= Nio liv =

Studio album by Sven-Ingvars
- Released: 1998
- Genre: dansband music, rock
- Label: Frituna

Sven-Ingvars chronology
Lika ung som då (1996)	Nio liv (1998)	Retroaktiv (2000)

Nio liv is a 1998 studio album by Sven-Ingvars.

== Track listing ==
1. Intro / P. Jonsson
2. Nio liv / S. Carlsson, P. Gessle
3. Gör det igen / D. Hylander
4. Mannen före mej / P. LeMarc
5. Byter bara blickar / P. Gessle
6. Brunetten i Brunskog / N. Strömstedt
7. Trubbel # 2 / P. Jonsson
8. Älskar du mig / P. Bäckman, S.-E. Magnusson
9. Det kommer från hjärtat / P. Fransson, P. Karlsson
10. Då mår jag riktigt bra / P. LeMarc
11. Du är så olik / S. Hellstrand
12. Min vän Johanna / N. Hellberg
13. Bara för din skull / P. Jonsson
14. Därför viskar jag ditt namn / N. Hellberg
15. Hoppa in i min bil / N. Hellberg
16. Marie, Marie / P. Gessle, D. Alvin

== Charts ==
Chart (1998)	Peak position
Sweden (Sverigetopplistan)	6
