= Sträck ut din hand (song) =

Song by Kellys

from the album Dansmix 3
- Language: Swedish
- Recorded: 1994
- Songwriter: Lasse Berghagen

"Sträck ut din hand" ("Stretch Out Your Hand") is a vispop song by Lasse Berghagen, released in 1994 on the band Kelleys' album Dansmix 3. In 1995, Berghagen released it on his album with the same name, and also as single.

According to Berghagen this song tells you that "du är inte ensam på den här planeten, du måste dela med dig och sträcka ut din hand, det är alltid någon som behöver den" ("You aren't alone on this planet, you must share with you and stretch out your hand, there is always someone who needs it").

It is a sing-along song at Allsång på Skansen. It was sung on 26 July 2011, then for people who were murdered at the Norway attacks four days earlier.
