= Retroaktiv =

Studio album by Sven-Ingvars
- Released: 20 March 2000
- Genre: dansband music, rock
- Label: NMG
- Producer: Mikael Nord Andersson

Sven-Ingvars chronology
Nio liv (1998)	Retroaktiv (2000)	Guld & glöd (2002)

Retroaktiv is a 2000 Sven-Ingvars studio album.

== Track listing ==
1. Högt i det blå / P. Gessle
2. På toppen igen / P. LeMarc
3. Saker jag borde gjort / N. Strömstedt, P. Gessle
4. Nånting stort hos mej / N. Hellberg
5. Kyssarna! / U. Svenningsson
6. När jag tänker på dej / P. LeMarc
7. Rödtopp / N. Strömstedt
8. Här nere på jorden / P. LeMarc
9. Lite som du vill / N. Hellberg
10. En mogen mans blues / L. Ahlin, S. Westfelt
11. Sofia i spegeln / P. LeMarc
12. Att just nu här i dag / L. Nilsson, H. Janson
13. Blåa ögon / P. Jonsson
14. Så många mil, så många år / D. Hylander

== Charts ==
Chart (2000)	Peak position
Sweden (Sverigetopplistan)	10
