= Stockholm i mitt hjärta =

Song by Lasse Berghagen

from the album Sträck ut din hand
- Language: Swedish
- Recorded: 1995
- Label: NMG
- Songwriter(s): Lasse Berghagen

Stockholm i mitt hjärta ("Stockholm In My Heart") is a Swedish vispop song by Lasse Berghagen who wrote it when Ulf Adelsohn wanted a new song about Stockholm when he became governor of Stockholm County in 1992.

Berghagen recorded the song on Svensktoppen on 7 August 1993 and finished in 10th place. Stockholm i mitt hjärta is in Berghagen's albums Sträck ut din hand (1995) and Stockholm, mina drömmars stad (2002).

Stockholm i mitt hjärta is theme music of the music show Allsång på Skansen since 1994, when Berghagen started as host.
