= Andreas Eenfeldt =

Swedish doctor (born 1972)

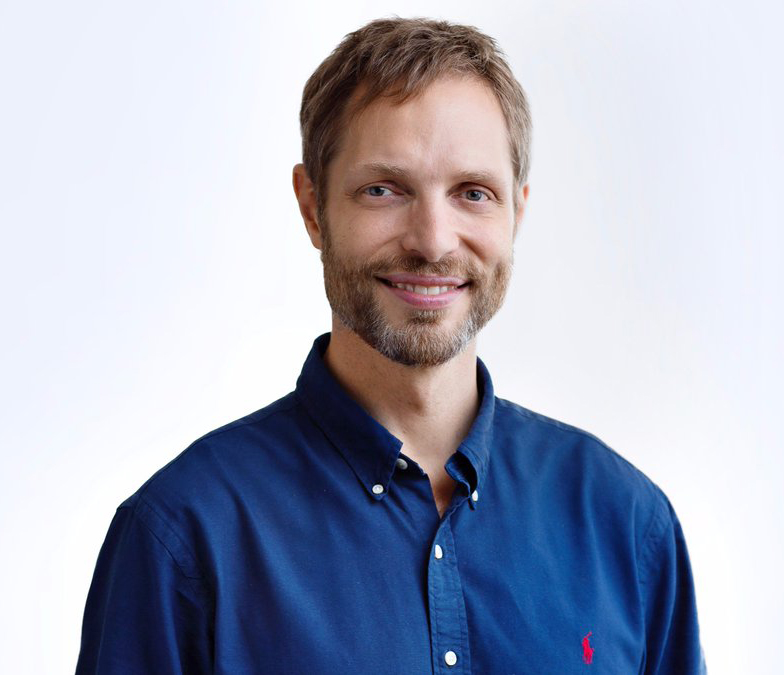
- Born: 19 January 1972 (age 54); Uppsala, Sweden
- Education: MD from Uppsala University
- Occupations: CEO, Doctor
- Known for: DietDoctor.com
- Notable work: The Food Revolution
- Board member of: The Dietary Science Foundation
- Website: www.dietdoctor.com/authors/dr-andreas-eenfeldt

Andreas Eenfeldt (born 19 January 1972) is a Swedish doctor specializing in family medicine. He is an advocate for low-carbohydrate high-fat diets and has criticized the saturated fat guidelines. Eenfeldt was born in 1972 and graduated from medical school at Uppsala University. A few years later, he started DietDoctor.com, a website focused on low-carbohydrate diets. He became a public figure in a heated debate over the merits of the diet.

== Early life and education ==
Andreas Eenfeldt was born in 1972. He earned a degree in medicine from Uppsala University. After graduating, Eenfeldt became interested in poker and eventually earned more money from online poker than from practicing medicine.

== Career ==
Initially, Eenfeldt encouraged overweight patients to follow the traditional dietary guidelines he learned at medical school, but his views changed over time. In 2007, he started a blog about low-carbohydrate dieting under the name "Kostdoktorn."

Within a few years, Kostdoktorn (now called dietdoctor) became the most visited health blog in Sweden. He created an English version in 2011. In 2015, Eenfeldt quit his job as a doctor to focus on the website. As of 2019, the website generates 50 million Swedish Krona (= US$5.7 million) per-year from 500,000 daily visitors. As of 2019, it had a staff of 30 employees and was mostly owned by Eenfeldt.

== Low-carbohydrate advocacy ==
Eenfeldt became a public figure and commentator in a heated debate over low-carbohydrate diets. In 2012, he published a book called Low Carb, High Fat Food Revolution: Advice and Recipes to Improve Your Health and Reduce Your Weight. It became a bestseller in Sweden and was translated into eight languages.

The low-carbohydrate, high-fat diets Eenfeldt advocates for are controversial and not supported by official dietary guidelines. Eenfeldt disputes the current saturated fat guidelines and says official dietary guidelines are not supported by good science. He has commented that "there is no good science to show that saturated fat is bad. I have been in contact with many experts but no one has been able to show me a single study that shows that it is dangerous, because there are no studies that show a reduced risk of heart attack and stroke."

An article in Science as Culture said low-carbohydrate advocates like Eenfeldt are exploiting anecdotes where patients experienced better health after adopting the diet.

== Personal life ==
Eenfeldt lives in Karlstad, Sweden with his wife and their two daughters.
