= Teddybjörnen Fredriksson =

Song by Lasse Berghagen
- Language: Swedish
- Recorded: 1969
- Songwriter: Lasse Berghagen

"Teddybjörnen Fredriksson" (Fredriksson, the Teddy bear) is a Swedish children's song by Lasse Berghagen who wrote it in 1969 for his 3-year-old daughter Malin. It's one of Berghagen's most famous songs. Many Swedish schools and pre-schools sing it and it has been voted as the most popular children's song. The song is about a person whose father gave him a teddy bear as birthday present when he was four years old and when he was married and got a four-year-old daughter, he gave her a teddy bear, carrying a family tradition further. This song made Berghagen famous among children, and the real "Teddy bear Fredriksson" is locked in a booth at Leksaksmuseet in Stockholm.

The song charted at Svensktoppen on 21–28 December 1969, with positions 9 and 10.

A cover was made of the song by the swedish singer Petra Marklund for the scandinavium edition of the album Love CPR

Carina Wessman recorded the song with lyrics in English by Björn Håkanson, as "Teddy Bears and Sunday School" on her 1980 album Don't Speak Bad About My Music.
