= Karlstad Municipality =

Karlstad Municipality Karlstads kommun
- Municipality
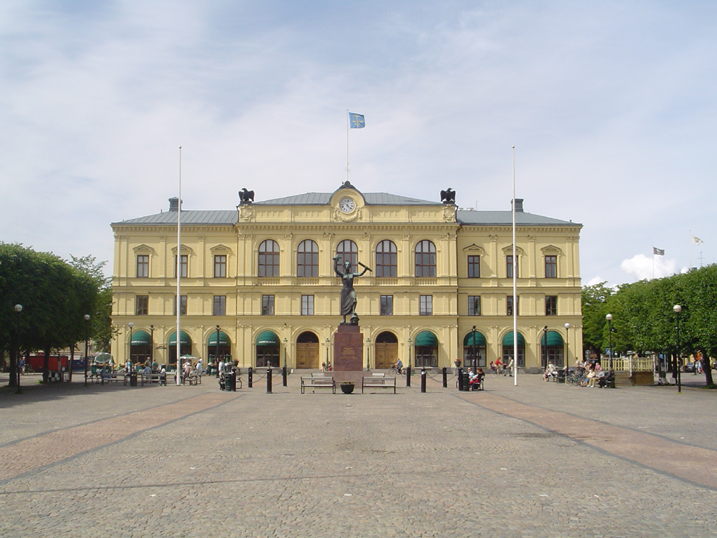
- Karlstad Courthouse

- Coat of arms

- Coordinates: 59°23′N 13°32′E
- Country: Sweden
- County: Värmland County
- Seat: Karlstad

Government
  - Chairman of City Executive Board: Per-Samuel Nisser (M)
  - Deputy Chairs of City Executive Board: Linda Larsson (S) and Maria Frisk (MP)

Area
  - Total: 1,517.74 km^{2} (586.00 sq mi)
  - Land: 1,169.11 km^{2} (451.40 sq mi)
  - Water: 348.63 km^{2} (134.61 sq mi)
- Area as of 1 January 2014.

Population (30 June 2025)
  - Total: 98,148
  - Density: 83.951/km^{2} (217.43/sq mi)
- Time zone: UTC+1 (CET)
  - Summer (DST): UTC+2 (CEST)
- ISO 3166 code: SE
- Province: Värmland
- Municipal code: 1780
- Website: www.karlstad.se

Karlstad Municipality (Swedish: Karlstads kommun) is a municipality in Värmland County in west central Sweden. Its seat is located in the city of Karlstad.

The present municipality was established in 1971 when the former City of Karlstad was amalgamated with a number of surrounding rural municipalities.

== Localities ==
- Alster
- Blombacka
- Karlstad (seat)
- Killstad
- Molkom
- Skattkärr
- Skåre
- Slängserud
- Vallargärdet
- Väse

== Politics ==
Municipalities are responsible for government-mandated duties, and elections for the Municipal council are held every four years, parallel to the general elections.

Until the 2010s inhabitants of Karlstad had a tendency to vote close to the national results at the general elections, making it the generally accepted bellwether town of Sweden. In 2022 this had decisively changed, with the winning right coalition performing seven points better overall than it did in Karlstad, with the bellwether municipalities instead being previous Social Democrats-dominated post-industrial towns in Bergslagen a bit northeast of Karlstad.

== Demographics ==
This is a demographic table based on Karlstad Municipality's electoral districts in the 2022 Swedish general election sourced from SVT's election platform, in turn taken from SCB official statistics.

In total there were 95,290 residents, including 74,827 Swedish citizens of voting age. 52.5% voted for the left coalition and 46.4% for the right coalition. Indicators are in percentage points except population totals and income.

Location	Residents	Citizen adults	Left vote	Right vote	Employed	Swedish parents	Foreign heritage	Income SEK	Degree
Location			%	%					
Alster N	1,977	1,547	47.0	51.9	86	94	6	30,665	53
Alster S	1,158	834	50.7	49.0	88	93	7	31,655	53
Bellevue-Bergvik	2,342	1,853	50.3	48.8	85	89	11	29,599	55
Edsvalla	1,354	976	44.1	54.6	78	84	16	25,037	31
Färjestad	2,116	1,749	45.5	53.1	84	87	13	29,113	52
Färjestad-Rud	2,051	1,681	55.1	44.1	79	85	15	24,641	52
Grava	1,748	1,315	38.6	60.5	85	95	5	29,211	43
Gruvlyckan	1,963	1,398	64.8	31.7	65	53	47	18,670	35
Haga	1,784	1,617	52.4	46.6	82	90	10	26,230	54
Hagalund	2,153	1,608	56.6	42.4	87	81	19	29,528	57
Herrhagen 1	1,795	1,537	54.6	44.8	77	84	16	22,821	55
Herrhagen 2	1,711	1,512	50.8	48.2	81	87	13	27,741	56
Herrhagen 3	1,853	1,539	55.9	42.9	80	88	12	25,714	60
Hultsberg	1,986	1,543	53.2	46.4	88	90	10	31,425	63
Inre Hamn	1,471	1,278	41.4	58.0	87	85	15	30,618	61
Klara	1,698	1,510	46.7	52.7	86	88	12	28,675	63
Kronoparken C	1,594	1,082	66.3	32.0	45	39	61	9,136	43
Kronoparken S	1,971	1,309	65.4	31.5	58	39	61	15,475	35
Kronoparken V	2,249	1,513	56.1	41.9	46	59	41	11,304	50
Kronoparken Ö	1,561	1,075	71.3	26.3	56	48	52	16,215	47
Kroppkärr	1,808	1,370	55.7	44.0	88	92	8	32,136	65
Kvarnberget	1,847	1,525	60.1	38.6	76	81	19	24,867	54
Lorensberg	1,643	1,204	59.6	40.1	90	91	9	32,234	63
Marieberg-Sommarro	1,954	1,570	56.6	42.8	83	89	11	29,735	68
Molkom	1,792	1,374	50.8	47.1	75	87	13	21,616	37
Norrstrand C	1,438	1,190	56.0	43.0	77	85	15	23,797	52
Norrstrand N	1,613	1,431	50.5	48.5	82	91	9	26,574	59
Norrstrand S	1,200	1,096	56.6	42.4	72	86	14	20,968	40
Norrstrand-Sjöstad	1,525	1,329	54.0	44.1	80	89	11	24,457	53
Nyed	2,018	1,632	43.8	55.5	81	92	8	24,682	35
Orrholmen	1,935	1,480	61.9	36.1	71	70	30	21,628	44
Romstad-Strand	1,929	1,467	50.2	49.7	85	89	11	31,584	63
Rud N	1,939	1,333	60.7	36.5	62	61	39	18,041	31
Rud S	1,761	1,372	60.5	37.7	66	67	33	18,476	41
Råtorp S	1,518	1,149	48.6	50.7	88	90	10	32,941	68
Råtorp-Älvåker	1,741	1,290	51.5	47.9	89	93	7	33,226	64
Skattkärr	1,755	1,282	47.2	51.7	84	93	7	28,319	47
Skåre	1,261	959	52.9	46.2	85	92	8	27,577	48
Soldattorpet	1,883	1,285	55.2	44.2	90	93	7	33,379	70
Stockfallet	2,491	1,670	53.3	46.6	89	85	15	32,076	64
Stodene	2,122	1,541	54.5	44.7	91	94	6	30,989	62
Sundsta	1,450	1,260	43.0	56.1	81	90	10	28,738	59
Tingvalla	1,711	1,769	45.6	53.4	77	80	20	24,958	51
Tingvallastaden	1,554	1,449	47.1	52.4	78	88	12	27,711	61
Torrmestad	1,411	1,188	56.0	43.0	79	87	13	26,485	55
Tullholmsviken	1,537	1,370	44.5	54.7	85	84	16	30,656	60
Universitetet	1,645	1,280	61.0	37.3	62	69	31	21,645	57
Viken	1,593	1,478	55.4	43.5	76	87	13	22,673	52
Vålberg	1,932	1,453	47.1	51.8	74	83	17	23,369	26
Vålberg-Nor	1,879	1,457	43.5	55.8	70	81	19	22,141	30
Våxnäs N	1,990	1,324	61.1	36.4	63	55	45	18,948	33
Våxnäs S	1,605	1,216	61.9	37.0	66	58	42	19,214	30
Väse	2,006	1,581	46.3	52.7	85	93	7	25,260	37
Östra Fågelvik	1,269	977	41.6	57.5	87	94	6	30,396	47
Source: SVT

== Elections ==
=== Riksdag ===
These are the local results of the Riksdag elections since the 1972 municipality reform. The results of the Sweden Democrats were not published by SCB between 1988 and 1998 at a municipal level to the party's small nationwide size at the time. "Votes" denotes valid votes, whereas "Turnout" denotes also blank and invalid votes.

Year	Turnout	Votes	V	S	MP	C	L	KD	M	SD	ND
1973	92.0	47,969	4.2	45.0	0.0	24.3	10.1	0.8	15.0	0.0	0.0
1976	92.6	50,261	3.8	41.8	0.0	22.6	12.1	0.5	18.8	0.0	0.0
1979	91.6	51,435	4.8	43.5	0.0	16.1	10.0	0.6	24.2	0.0	0.0
1982	92.2	52,341	5.0	46.4	1.8	13.2	5.7	1.0	26.9	0.0	0.0
1985	90.5	52,538	4.8	45.2	1.9	9.2	14.6	0.0	24.3	0.0	0.0
1988	85.8	50,120	5.2	44.4	5.2	10.4	12.6	1.8	20.1	0.0	0.0
1991	87.5	51,742	4.2	37.5	3.3	7.2	9.5	7.0	23.7	0.0	7.0
1994	88.0	52,738	6.4	44.4	4.9	6.3	8.3	3.8	24.3	0.0	1.1
1998	82.8	50,206	12.7	36.4	4.9	4.1	4.7	12.0	23.2	0.0	0.0
2002	82.0	51,272	7.9	39.9	4.8	5.7	14.2	8.6	15.2	1.4	0.0
2006	83.6	53,554	6.0	36.8	5.5	7.5	7.7	6.5	25.2	2.3	0.0
2010	86.1	57,709	5.5	32.9	8.0	5.5	7.5	5.3	29.9	4.2	0.0
2014	87.7	61,111	5.5	34.7	7.8	5.7	5.3	4.5	23.3	9.6	0.0
2018	89.0	63,334	7.9	31.7	4.8	8.5	5.7	6.4	19.5	14.1	0.0

Blocs

This lists the relative strength of the socialist and centre-right blocs since 1973, but parties not elected to the Riksdag are inserted as "other", including the Sweden Democrats results from 1988 to 2006, but also the Christian Democrats pre-1991 and the Greens in 1982, 1985 and 1991. The sources are identical to the table above. The coalition or government mandate marked in bold formed the government after the election. New Democracy got elected in 1991 but are still listed as "other" due to the short lifespan of the party. "Elected" is the total number of percentage points from the municipality that went to parties who were elected to the Riksdag.

Year	Turnout	Votes	Left	Right	SD	Other	Elected
1973	92.0	47,969	**49.2**	49.4	0.0	1.4	98.6
1976	92.6	50,261	45.6	**53.5**	0.0	0.9	99.1
1979	91.6	51,435	48.3	**50.3**	0.0	1.4	98.6
1982	92.2	52,341	**51.4**	45.8	0.0	2.8	97.2
1985	90.5	52,538	**50.0**	48.1	0.0	1.9	98.1
1988	85.8	50,120	**54.8**	43.1	0.0	2.1	97.9
1991	87.5	51,742	41.7	**47.4**	0.0	11.9	96.1
1994	88.0	52,738	**55.7**	42.7	0.0	1.6	98.4
1998	82.8	50,206	**54.0**	44.0	0.0	2.0	98.0
2002	82.0	51,272	**52.6**	43.7	0.0	3.7	96.3
2006	83.6	53,554	48.3	**46.9**	0.0	4.8	95.2
2010	86.1	57,709	46.4	**48.2**	4.2	1.2	98.8
2014	87.7	61,111	**48.0**	38.8	9.6	3.6	96.4
2018	89.0	63,334	**44.5**	40.1	14.1	1.5	98.5

== Notable natives ==
- Bengt Alsterlind, TV host ("Hajk")
- Zarah Leander, singer
- Sven-Erik Magnusson, singer/dance band artist (Sven-Ingvars)
- Christer Sjögren, rock/dansband singer (Vikingarna)
- Ulf Sterner, ice hockey player (first Swede to play in the National Hockey League)
- Fabian Zetterlund, ice hockey forward for the San Jose Sharks
- Elgen Helge, local hero (Most handsome moose around)

== Sites of interest ==
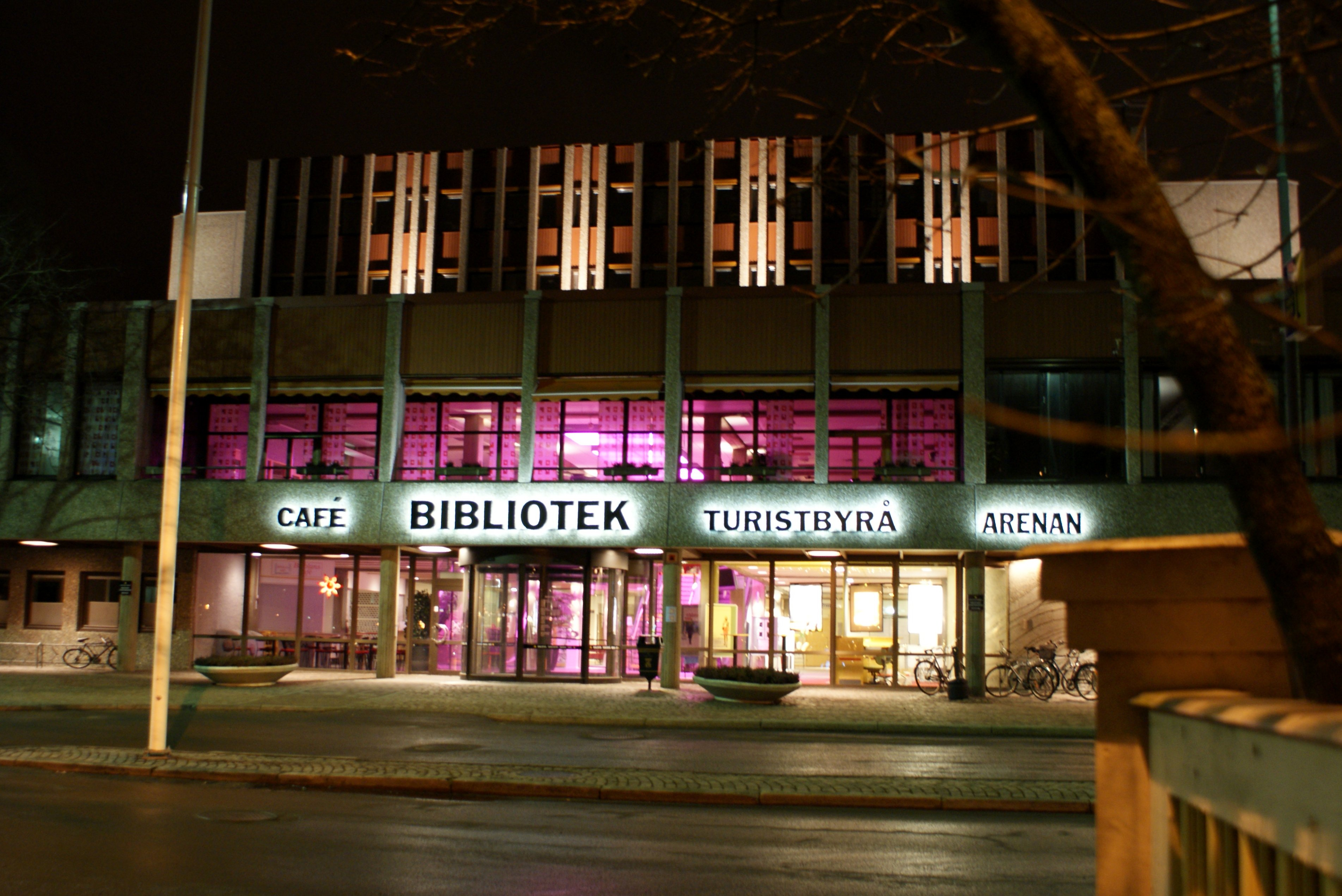
Karlstad municipal library, and facilities for the municipal government

- Alsters herrgård, the manor house where Gustaf Fröding was born
- Karlstad Church, built in 1730
- An indoor ice rink and event arena, Löfbergs Arena, expanded in 2002 to host the Ice Hockey World Championships*
- Sweden's only indoor speed skating arena, Tingvalla isstadion. It is constructed in a world unique way. While normally it consists of a bandy field and two ice hockey rinks, on occasion the boards are dismantled in order to make room for the speed skating oval.
- Botanical gardens
- The masonic lodge where the negotiations for the dissolution of the union between Sweden and Norway were held in 1905
- A runestone Vr 2, one of four known in Värmland
- A history museum
- A nature museum

== International relations ==
=== Twin towns – sister cities ===
The municipality is twinned with:

- Blönduós, Iceland
- Gaziantep, Turkey
- Horsens, Denmark
- Jõgeva, Estonia
- Moss, Norway
- Nokia, Finland

== See also ==
- Da Buzz
- Swedish Rescue Services Agency
- Swedish Rally
- Klarälven
- Karlstad Hundred
- Färjestads BK
