= Två mörka ögon (song) =

Song by Sven-Ingvars

from the album Två mörka ögon
- Released: 1991
- Genre: Dansband
- Label: NMG
- Songwriter(s): Bert Månson

"Två mörka ögon" is a song by the Swedish dansband Sven-Ingvars, written by musician Bert Månson. It was a hit on Svensktoppen for 71 weeks between 24 November 1991-6 June 1993 which included topping the chart, as well as appearing on the 1991 Sven-Ingvars album med samma namn

In 1997, Sven-Erik Magnusson, as Sven-Enrique Magnusson, recorded the song in Spanish as "Dos ojos lindos", releasing it as a single.

== Cover versions ==
Black Ingvars covered "Två mörka ögon" for their 1995 studio album Earcandy Six. In 2007, Swedish dansband Mats Bergmans covered the song for their album Kalifornien. At Dansbandskampen 2008, the song was performed by Scotts, giving it a rock ballad arrangement with slower tempo, and electric guitars. This version also appeared on Scott's 2008 album På vårt sätt. The song was also performed at Dansbandskampen 2010 by Rigo & Topaz Sound. Anne-Lie Rydé did a cover of the song on her 2010 album Dans på rosor. In 2017, a cover version of the song was released by Sabina Ddumba as a part of the eighth season of Så mycket bättre.
