= Byns enda blondin =

Studio album by Sven-Ingvars
- Released: 1994
- Genre: Dansband, rock
- Length: 42:49
- Label: NMG

Sven-Ingvars chronology
Två mörka ögon (1991)	Byns enda blondin (1994)	Lika ung som då (1996)

Byns enda blondin is a 1994 Sven-Ingvars studio album.

== Track listing ==
No.	Title	Writer(s)	original title	Length
1.	"Om jag kan få dig att förstå"	M. Wendt, C. Lundh		3:21
2.	"Det är du, det är jag, det är vi"	M. Wendt, C. Lundh		2:58
3.	"En marguerita till"	F. Rossi, B. Frost, M. Wendt, C. Lundh	Marguerita Time	3:28
4.	"Byns enda blondin"	N. Strömstedt		4:45
5.	"Sommar i Sverige"	M. Wendt, C. Lundh		3:45
6.	"Allt blir bra"	C. Sandelin		3:04
7.	"Gamla polare"	B. Månson		3:00
8.	"Mannen för dig"	M. Saxell		3:06
9.	"Vi går på stranden"	M. Wendt, C. Lundh		3:58
10.	"Ung, blåögd och blyg"	L. Holm		3:08
11.	"En man i blått"	N. Hellberg		2:43
12.	"Torparrock"	G. Johansson		4:26
13.	"Wild Cat Blues"	F. Waller, C. Williams		1:07
Total length:				42:49

== Charts ==
Chart (1994)	Peak position
Sweden (Sverigetopplistan)	15
