= Lika ung som då =

Studio album by Sven-Ingvars
- Released: February 1996
- Genre: dansband music, rock
- Length: circa 47 minutes
- Label: NMG

Sven-Ingvars chronology
Byns enda blondin (1994)	Lika ung som då (1996)	Nio liv (1998)

Lika ung som då is a 1996 Sven-Ingvars studio album.

== Track listing ==
1. Jailhouse Rock (intro) (J. Leiber, M. Stoller (recorded 1958)
2. Lika ung som då (N. Strömstedt)
3. Sanna från Sunne (M. Flynner, M. Lindman)
4. Hus till salu (P. LeMarc)
5. Bara vara (P. LeMarc, W. Modiggård)
6. Marie, Marie (S. Hellstrand)
7. Månskensnatt i Åmotfors (P. Jonsson)
8. Minsta lilla tecken (N. Hellberg)
9. Varenda sommar blir din (N. Hellberg)
10. Ge allt du kan (P. Gessle)
11. Visa mej vägen (L. Lindbom)
12. Kyss mej stilla (P. LeMarc)
13. En sista doft av sommaren (D. Hylander)
14. Mina sommarskor minns (L. Lindbom)
15. Sommarskor (repris) (L. Lindbom)

== Charts ==
Chart (1996)	Peak position
Sweden (Sverigetopplistan)	3
