= Vid din sida =

1966 single by Sven-Ingvars

Single by Sven-Ingvars
- A-side: "Grattis, lilla mamma (double A-side)"
- Released: 1966
- Genre: Rock; pop
- Label: Svensk American
- Songwriter: Ingvar Hellberg
- Producer: Larry Finnegan

"Vid din sida" is a song written by Ingvar Hellberg. and recorded by Sven-Ingvars, releasing it as a single around November 1966.

The song charted at Svensktoppen for 15 weeks starting from 5 November 1966.

== Charts ==
Weekly chart performance for "Vid din sida"
Chart (1966–1967)	Peak position
Finland (Suomen virallinen lista)	37
Norway (VG-lista)	3
