= Sommar i Sverige =

Single by Sven-Ingvars

from the album Byns enda blondin
- A-side: "Sommar i Sverige"
- B-side: "Mannen för dig"
- Released: 1994
- Genre: dansband
- Label: NMG
- Songwriters: Christer Lundh; Mikael Wendt

"Sommar i Sverige" is a song written by Christer Lundh and Mikael Wendt. Lyrically describing the coastlines of Sweden during the summertime, the song was recorded by Sven-Ingvars, and released as a single in 1994. and on the album Byns enda blondin the same year.

The song also appeared at Svensktoppen for seven weeks during the period 16 July – 27 August 1994.

In 1996, the song was covered by Lasse Petters. and by Casanovas on the 2013 album Sommar i Sverige.
