= Blombacka =

- Location within Sweden
- Coordinates: 59°37′N 13°48′E
- Country: Sweden
- Province: Värmland
- County: Värmland County
- Municipality: Karlstad Municipality

Area
  - Total: 1.0 km^{2} (0.39 sq mi)

Population (31 December 2010)
  - Total: 217
  - Density: 217/km^{2} (560/sq mi)
- Time zone: UTC+1 (CET)
  - Summer (DST): UTC+2 (CEST)

Blombacka is a locality situated in Karlstad Municipality, Värmland County, Sweden with 217 inhabitants in 2010. The county is located in the historical province of the same name.
