= Grums Municipality =

Grums Municipality Grums kommun
- Municipality
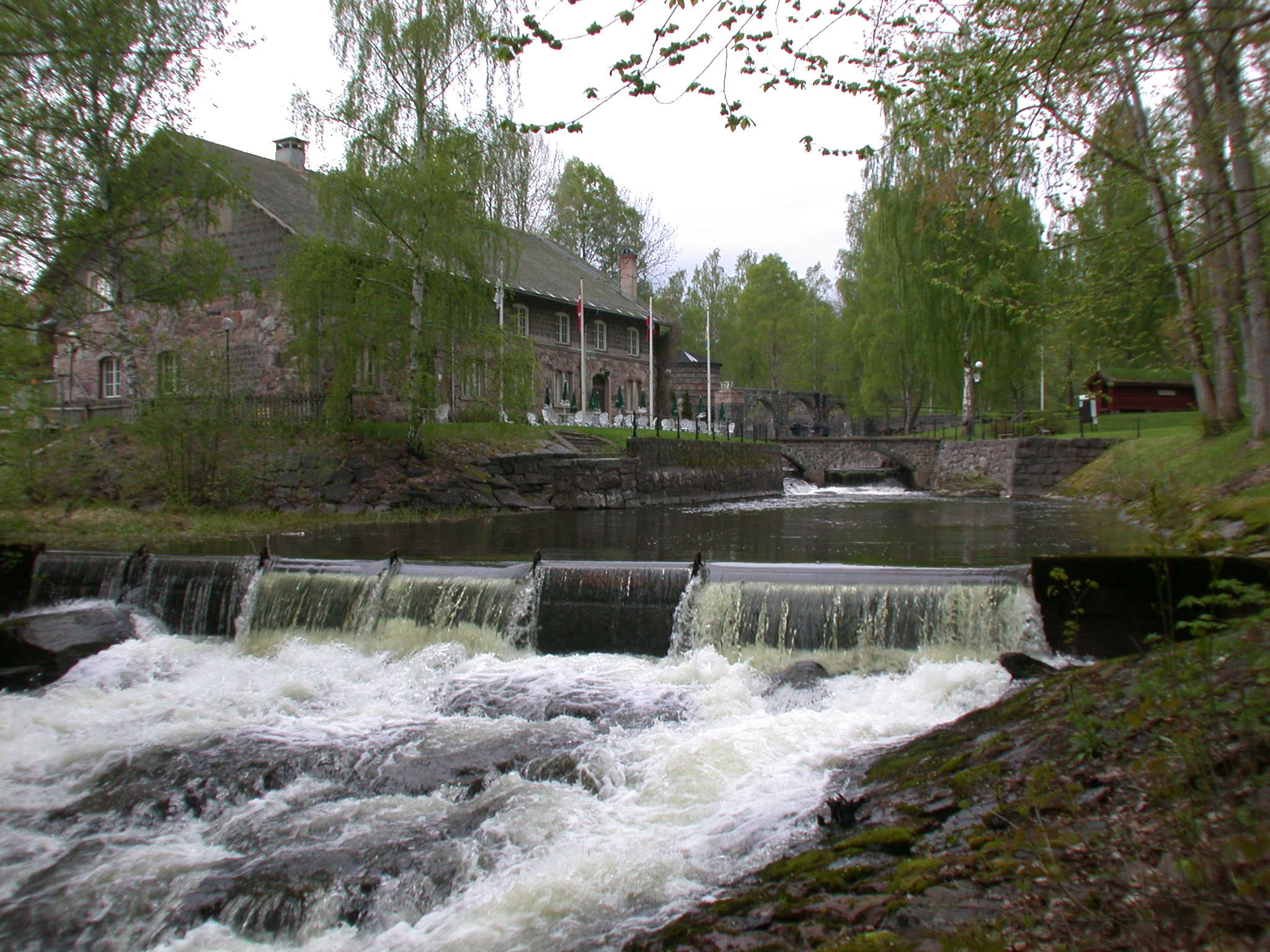

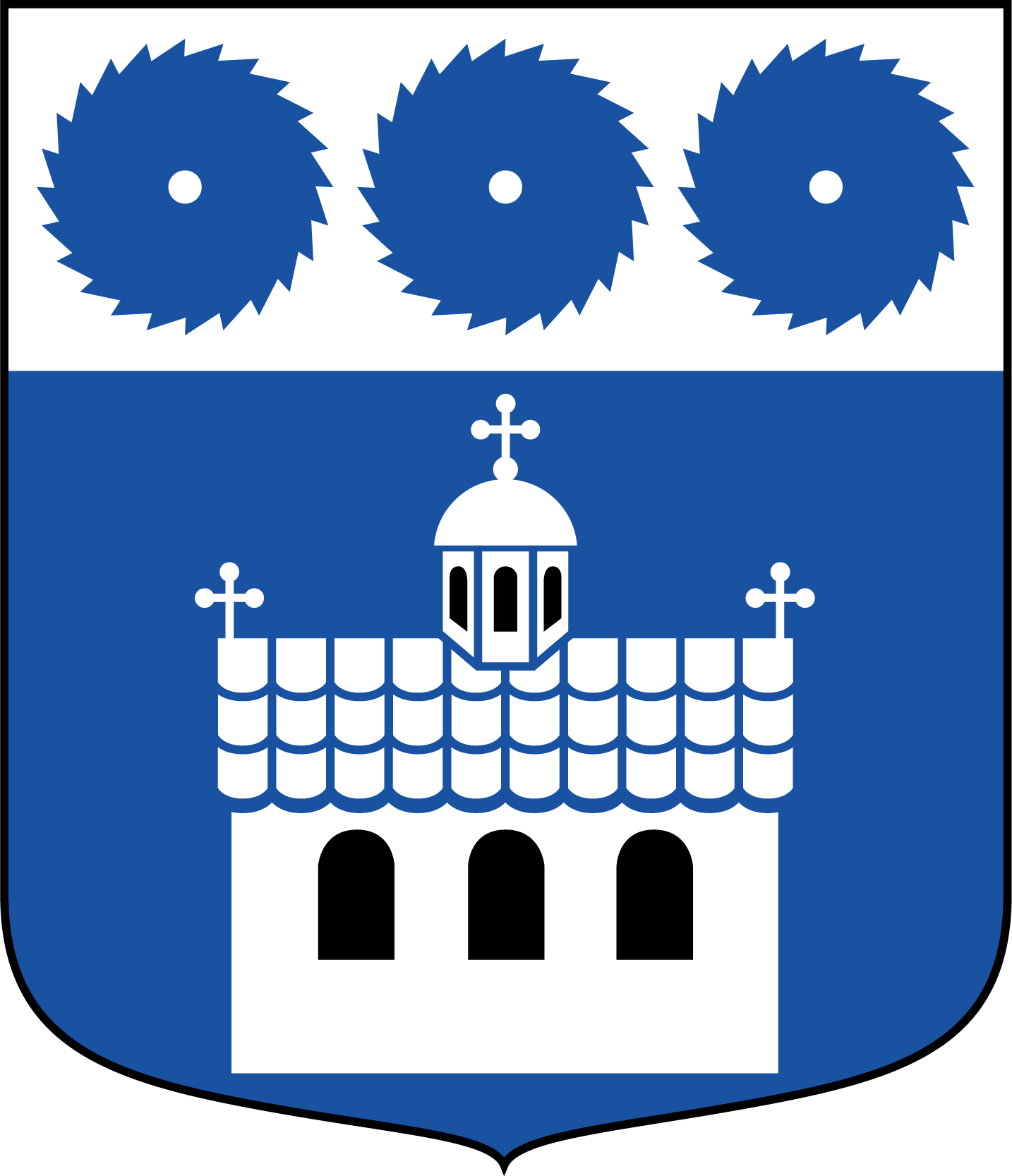
- Coat of arms

- Coordinates: 59°21′N 13°06′E
- Country: Sweden
- County: Värmland County
- Seat: Grums

Area
  - Total: 478.82 km^{2} (184.87 sq mi)
  - Land: 386.38 km^{2} (149.18 sq mi)
  - Water: 92.44 km^{2} (35.69 sq mi)
- Area as of 1 January 2014.

Population (30 June 2025)
  - Total: 8,921
  - Density: 23.09/km^{2} (59.80/sq mi)
- Time zone: UTC+1 (CET)
  - Summer (DST): UTC+2 (CEST)
- ISO 3166 code: SE
- Province: Värmland
- Municipal code: 1764
- Website: www.grums.se

Grums Municipality (Swedish: Grums kommun) is a municipality in Värmland County in west central Sweden. Its seat is located in the town of Grums, with about 5,200 inhabitants.

As so many of the municipalities of Sweden the present entity was created in 1971. The market town (köping) Grums (instituted as such in 1948) was amalgamated with Ed and the parish Värmskog from the dissolved Stavnäs Municipality, thus forming Grums Municipality.

Geographically it is situated on the north-west shore of Lake Vänern in the province of Värmland. Transportations are reliable with the European route E18 intersecting the town.

Historically the town was the center of the historical jurisdiction Grums Hundred, with its oldest seal stemming from 1617. The seal showed an accurate image of the local church.

The coat of arms is derived from that of the hundred. It also depicts three saw-blades, symbolizing the forest industry.

The local political party is known as Grums medborgarparti, abbreviated gm. It was founded in 1994, in the wake of the short-lived unconventional party Ny Demokrati. The party was the municipality's third largest in the election of 1994 and 1998.

== Localities ==
- Grums (seat)
- Slottsbron
- Segmon
- Borgvik
- Liljedal

In addition, the village Värmskog, with 65 inhabitants (2000), is known as the birthplace of inventor Lars Magnus Ericsson.

== Demographics ==
This is a demographic table based on Grums Municipality's electoral districts in the 2022 Swedish general election sourced from SVT's election platform, in turn taken from SCB official statistics.

In total there were 9,080 residents, including 6,952 Swedish citizens of voting age. 49.1% voted for the left coalition and 49.9% for the right coalition. Indicators are in percentage points except population totals and income.

Location	Residents	Citizen adults	Left vote	Right vote	Employed	Swedish parents	Foreign heritage	Income SEK	Degree
Location			%	%					
Gamla Slottsbron	1,538	1,190	53.2	45.9	80	88	12	25,554	28
Grums C	1,283	969	50.3	49.3	79	87	13	24,004	22
Grums N	1,109	879	42.2	56.3	86	91	9	27,077	30
Grums S	1,037	730	50.8	49.0	73	80	20	22,662	20
Grums V	1,426	1,149	58.6	40.3	71	84	16	20,373	25
Segmon	741	580	50.5	47.9	74	86	14	22,017	22
Slottsbron	1,298	960	45.0	53.7	72	84	16	23,000	21
Värmskog	648	495	37.3	62.0	83	92	8	26,545	39
Source: SVT
