= Byns enda blondin (song) =

Single by Sven-Ingvars

from the album Byns enda blondin
- A-side: "Byns enda blondin"
- B-side: "Om det känns rätt"
- Released: 1994
- Genre: dansband music
- Label: NMG
- Songwriter: Niklas Strömstedt

"Byns enda blondin" is a song written by Niklas Strömstedt. Sung from the perspective of a postman, it was recorded by Sven-Ingvars, who released it as a single in 1994, and also appeared as a title track on the album with the same name.

The song became a Svensktoppen hit for 15 weeks between 5 March-11 June 1994.

The song was recorded by Fagrells in 1995 and Niklas Strömstedt in 1998.
