= Farväl till sommaren =

Song by Lasse Berghagen

from the album Jag ville bli någon
- Language: Swedish
- Released: 1976
- Genre: pop
- Label: Philips
- Songwriter: Lasse Berghagen

"Farväl till sommaren" is a song written by Lars Berghagen.

Writing the song in late summer in Fjällbacka, the lyrics are a goodbye-song for the summer, upon the arrival of autumn in Sweden. The song was part of Lasse Berghagen's dinner shows at Berns Salonger. Recording it, using it as a B-side for the 1976 single "Då gör vi så", the song became successful for Sven-Ingvars. och scoring a Svensktoppen hit lasting for 11 weeks in late 1976-early 1977, even topping the chart.

Lasse Berghagen himself also recorded the song on his 1976 album Jag ville bli någon 1976 as well as Roland Cedermark on his 1993 album Roland Cedermark spelar vackra visor

The song has also been recorded by Sten & Stanley on 1985 album Musik, dans & party.
