= Två mörka ögon =

Studio album by Sven-Ingvars
- Released: 1991
- Recorded: 1991
- Genre: dansband music
- Length: 45 minutes
- Label: NMG

Sven-Ingvars chronology
På begäran (1990)	Två mörka ögon (1991)	Byns enda blondin (1994)

Två mörka ögon is a 1991 album from Swedish "dansband" Sven-Ingvars.

== Track listing ==
1. Två mörka ögon
2. Jag ringer på fredag
3. Virus och bakterier
4. Börja om från början
5. På sångens vingar
6. Markandsdagen
7. Min gamla vän
8. Nidälven
9. I en röd liten stuga
10. Det var i vår ungdoms fagraste vår
11. Regnets rytm (Rhythm of the Rain)
12. Marina
13. Barndomshemmet (On the Banks of the Wabash, Far Away)
14. Fryksdalsdans
15. DamhsaFreexDals

== Charts ==
Chart (1992)	Peak position
Sweden (Sverigetopplistan)	49
