= Vallargärdet =

- Location within Sweden
- Coordinates: 59°28′N 13°33′E
- Country: Sweden
- Province: Värmland
- County: Värmland County
- Municipality: Karlstad Municipality

Area
  - Total: 0.64 km^{2} (0.25 sq mi)

Population (31 December 2010)
  - Total: 382
  - Density: 596/km^{2} (1,540/sq mi)
- Time zone: UTC+1 (CET)
  - Summer (DST): UTC+2 (CEST)

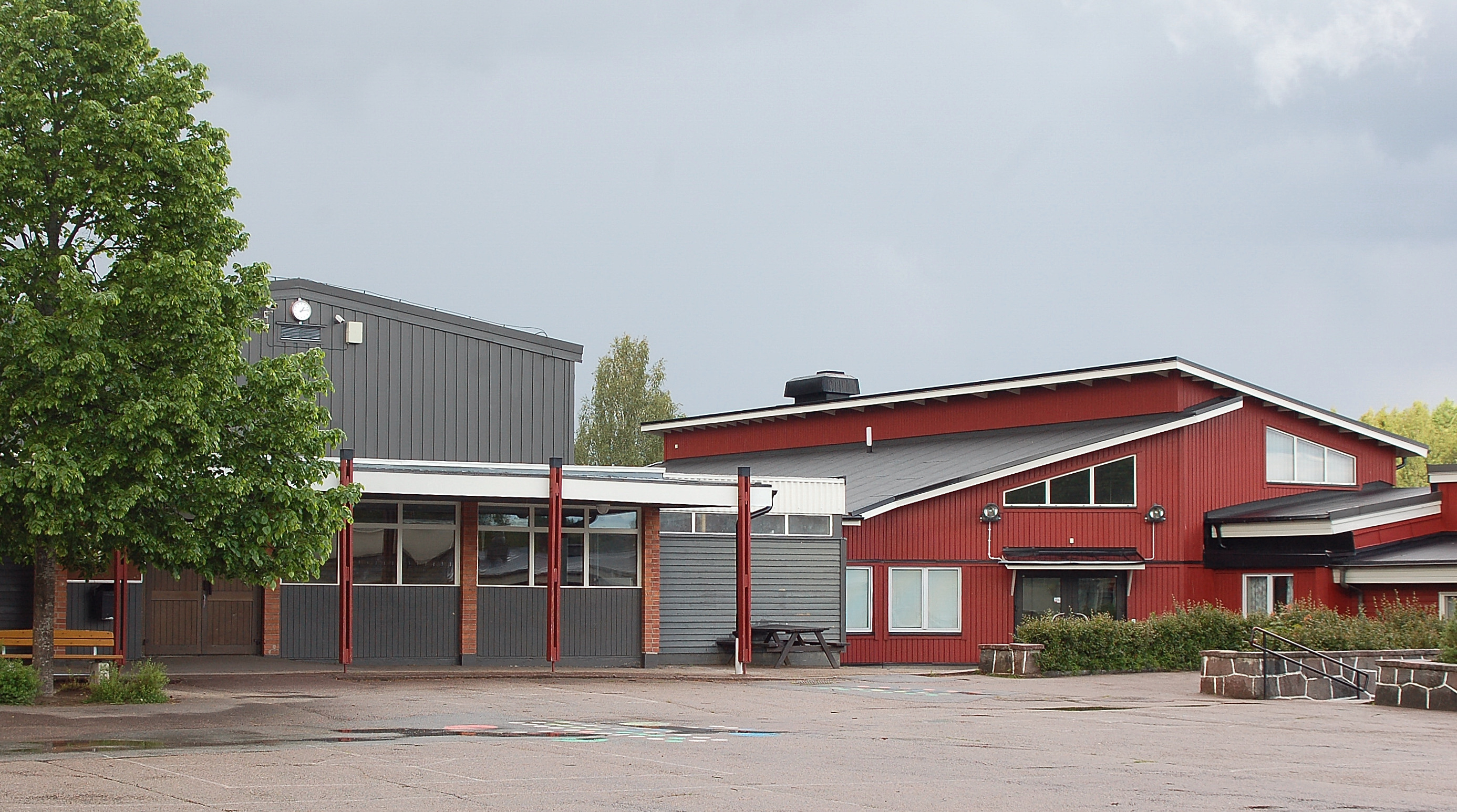
Vallargärdet school

Vallargärdet is a locality situated in Karlstad Municipality, Värmland County, Sweden with 382 inhabitants in 2010.
