= Slängserud =

- Location within Sweden
- Coordinates: 59°32′32″N 13°48′47″E
- Country: Sweden
- Province: Värmland
- County: Värmland County
- Municipality: Karlstad Municipality
- Time zone: UTC+1 (CET)
  - Summer (DST): UTC+2 (CEST)

Slängserud is a locality in Nyeds parish in the Karlstad Municipality, Värmland County. Located next to North Lake Barsjön. Slängserud consisting of parts Slängserudsgård and Slängserudstorp.

== History ==
In 1890, when The Swedish Census was so living there 73 people in Slängserud. Most of them worked with farming.
