= Jul i vårt hus =

Studio album by Lasse Berghagen
- Released: 17 November 2004
- Recorded: Purple Sound Studio, Stockholm, Sweden, April–October 2004
- Genre: Christmas, schlager
- Length: 42 minutes
- Label: NMG

Lasse Berghagen chronology
Lars Berghagen 20 klassiker (2004)	Jul i vårt hus (2004)	Lasse Berghagen och Sveriges Radios symfoniorkester (2006)

Jul i vårt hus is a studio album released on 17 November 2004, and is a Christmas album by Lasse Berghagen.

== Track listing ==
1. Det är jul i vårt hus
2. Låt julens budskap nå vår jord (Let It Be Christmas)
3. Ser du stjärnan i det blå (When You Wish Upon a Star)
4. Juletid, julefrid
5. Nu tändas tusen juleljus
6. Snölyktan
7. Det är dags att tända alla ljusen (Have Yourself a Merry Little Christmas)
8. Jag vill inte va' din pepparkaksgubbe
9. Det är jul
10. Låt mig få tända ett ljus (Schlafe, mein Prinzchen, schlaf ein)
11. Då är du aldrig ensam
12. Juletid, välkommen hit (Leise rieselt der Schnee)
13. Jag drömmer om en jul hemma (White Christmas)
14. Stilla natt (Stille Nacht, heilige Nacht)

== Contributors ==
- Lasse Berghagen - Sång
- Stockholm Session Strings - Musiker

== Charts ==
=== Weekly charts ===
Chart (2004)	Peak position
Swedish Albums (Sverigetopplistan)	4

=== Year-end charts ===
Chart (2004)	Position
Swedish Albums (Sverigetopplistan)	60

== Certifications ==
Region	Certification	Certified units/sales
Sweden (GLF)	Gold	30,000^{^}
^{^} Shipments figures based on certification alone.
