= Skåre, Sweden =

Skåre
- Location within Sweden
- Coordinates: 59°26′N 13°26′E
- Country: Sweden
- Province: Värmland
- County: Värmland County
- Municipality: Karlstad Municipality

Area
  - Total: 3.88 km^{2} (1.50 sq mi)

Population (31 December 2010)
  - Total: 5,402
  - Density: 1,391/km^{2} (3,600/sq mi)
- Time zone: UTC+1 (CET)
  - Summer (DST): UTC+2 (CEST)

Skåre is a locality situated in Karlstad Municipality, Värmland County, Sweden with 5,402 inhabitants in 2010. The town grew up around the railway station which was an important transshipment point: goods transported on the Klarälven River were here transferred to rail for onward conveyance, and vice versa .
