= Killstad =

Settlement in Karlstad Municipality, Sweden

Coordinates: 59°30′00″N 013°36′00″E

Killstad is a populated place in Karlstad Municipality, Värmland County, Sweden.
