= Grums =

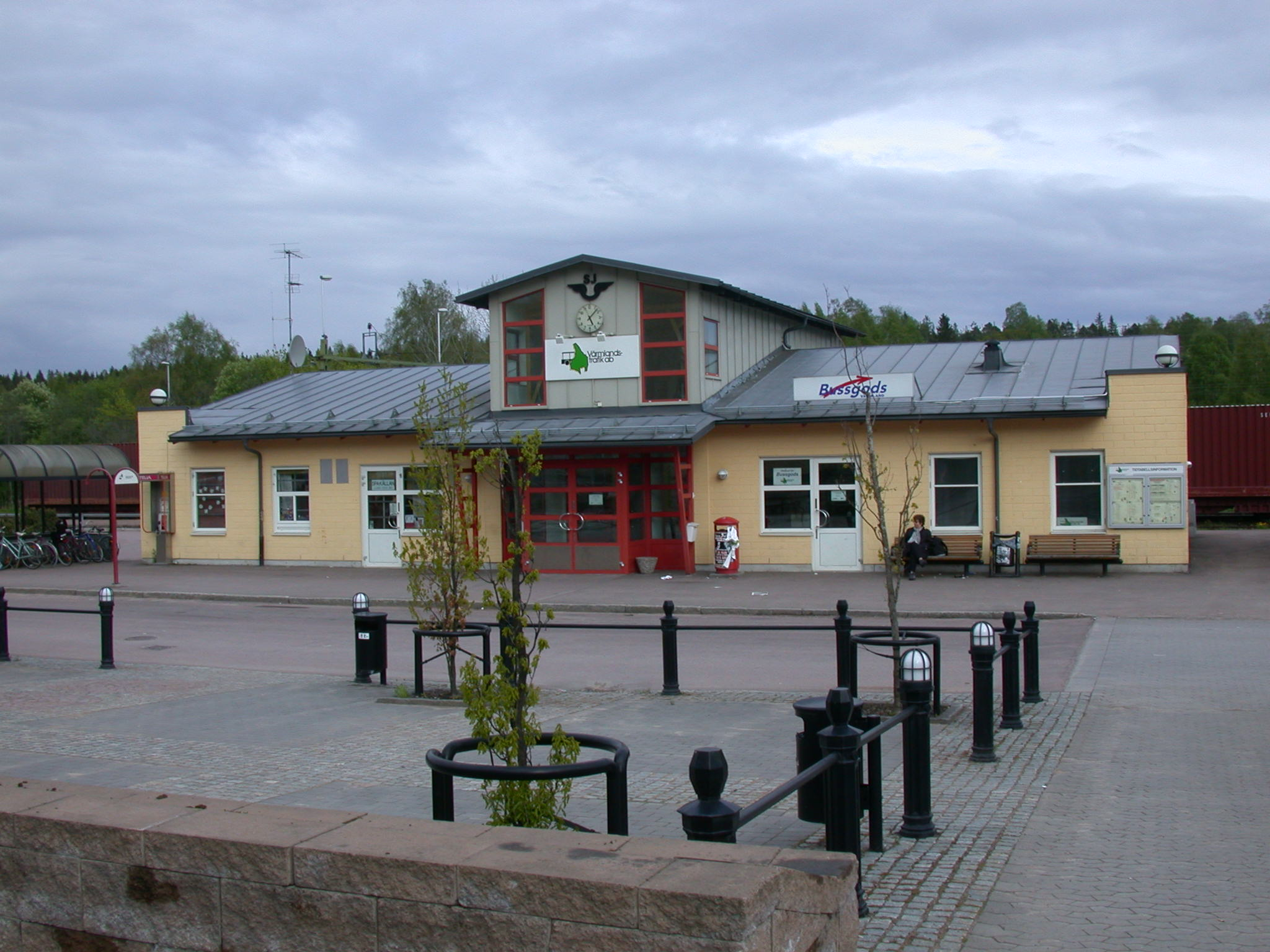
- Grums railway station

- Location within Sweden
- Coordinates: 59°21′N 13°06′E
- Country: Sweden
- Province: Värmland
- County: Värmland County
- Municipality: Grums Municipality

Area
  - Total: 5.62 km^{2} (2.17 sq mi)

Population (31 December 2010)
  - Total: 5,025
  - Density: 895/km^{2} (2,320/sq mi)
- Time zone: UTC+1 (CET)
  - Summer (DST): UTC+2 (CEST)

Grums is a locality and the seat of Grums Municipality, Värmland County, Sweden with 5,025 inhabitants in 2010.

== History ==
Grums has historically served as the parish seat (Swedish: kyrkby) of Grums Parish. Following the municipal reform of 1862, it became part of Grums rural municipality. A municipal community (Swedish: municipalsamhälle) was established in the locality on 26 May 1939. In 1948, the rural municipality, including the municipal community, was reorganized into market town (Swedish: Grums köping). However, the built-up area of Grums only covered a small portion of the new köping. In 1971, Grums köping was incorporated into the newly formed Grums Municipality, with Grums as its administrative center.

Until 1882, the locality was part of the Grums judicial district (Swedish: tingslag), and from 1882 to 1971, it belonged to the Mellansysslet judicial district. Between 1971 and 2005, it was included in the Karlstad judicial district (Swedish: domsaga), and since 2005, it has been part of the Värmland judicial district.
