= Norrortsleden =

Road in Stockholm County, Sweden

Coordinates: 59°27′42″N 17°58′3″E

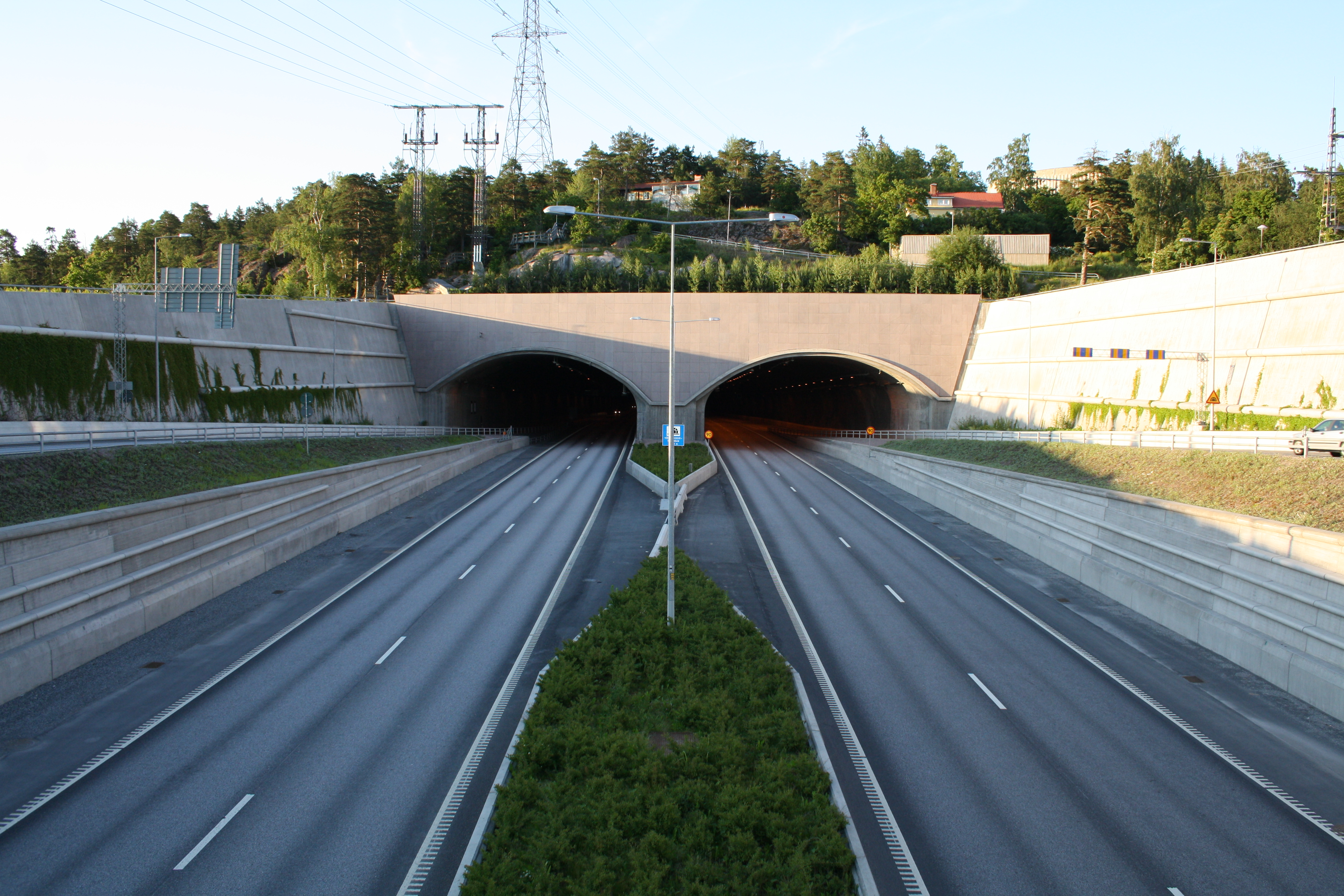
The finished Törnskog tunnel in 2009

Norrortsleden is a road in Stockholm County, Sweden, providing connection from the European route E4 in the municipality of Sollentuna to European route E18 in the municipality of Österåker. The road is a motorway between Sollentuna and Täby kyrkby, and a 2+1 road the rest of the way to the E18. The road was opened on 4 October 2008.

== Description ==
Norrortsleden was completed in 2008, and is numbered 265. The connection with European highway E18 is provided with a new interchange at Trafikplats Rosenkälla, designated with exit number 187. The motorway was opened in several stages; and the 2.1 kilometer long Törnskog tunnel was opened in late June 2008.

Serving the municipalities of Österåker, Täby, and Sollentuna, this motorway provides a quick, fast, safe, and easily accessible route for commuters along the northern suburbs of Stockholm. The intersection with European highway E4 has been constructed and is open for traffic, known as Häggviksleden, which opened in 1998.
