= Önskebrunnen =

Single by Sven-Ingvars
- A-side: "Önskebrunnen"
- B-side: Telefonannonsen"
- Released: November 1967
- Genre: popular music
- Label: Svensk American
- Songwriter: Rune Wallebom

"Önskebrunnen" is a song based around the old themes with wishing wells, and written by Rune Wallebom and originally recorded by Sven-Ingvars who released it as a single in October 1967. It also appeared on a 1967 EP record for the film Under ditt parasoll., and the song was also film music for that film in 1968.

The song also became a Svensktoppen hit, charting between 5 November 1967-7 January 1968, staying at the chart for 10 weeks.

Sven-Ingvars also rerecorded the song for the 1990 album På begäran 1990.

Rune Wallebom has also recorded the album, which he did on the 1975 album Danspartaj med Rune Walleboms bästa.

It has also been recorded with th accordion, which was done by Glenn Sundberg on the album Gobitar på dragspel in 1991.

Among other dansbands who have recorded it are Leif Hagbergs, on the 2004 album Låtar vi minns 3.

== Charts ==
Chart (1967–1968)	Peak position
Norway (VG-lista)	1
