= Ingared =

- Location within Västra Götaland Location within Sweden
- Coordinates: 57°51′N 12°28′E
- Country: Sweden
- Province: Västergötland
- County: Västra Götaland County
- Municipality: Alingsås Municipality

Area
  - Total: 0.78 km^{2} (0.30 sq mi)

Population (31 December 2010)
  - Total: 1,299
  - Density: 1,676/km^{2} (4,340/sq mi)
- Time zone: UTC+1 (CET)
  - Summer (DST): UTC+2 (CEST)

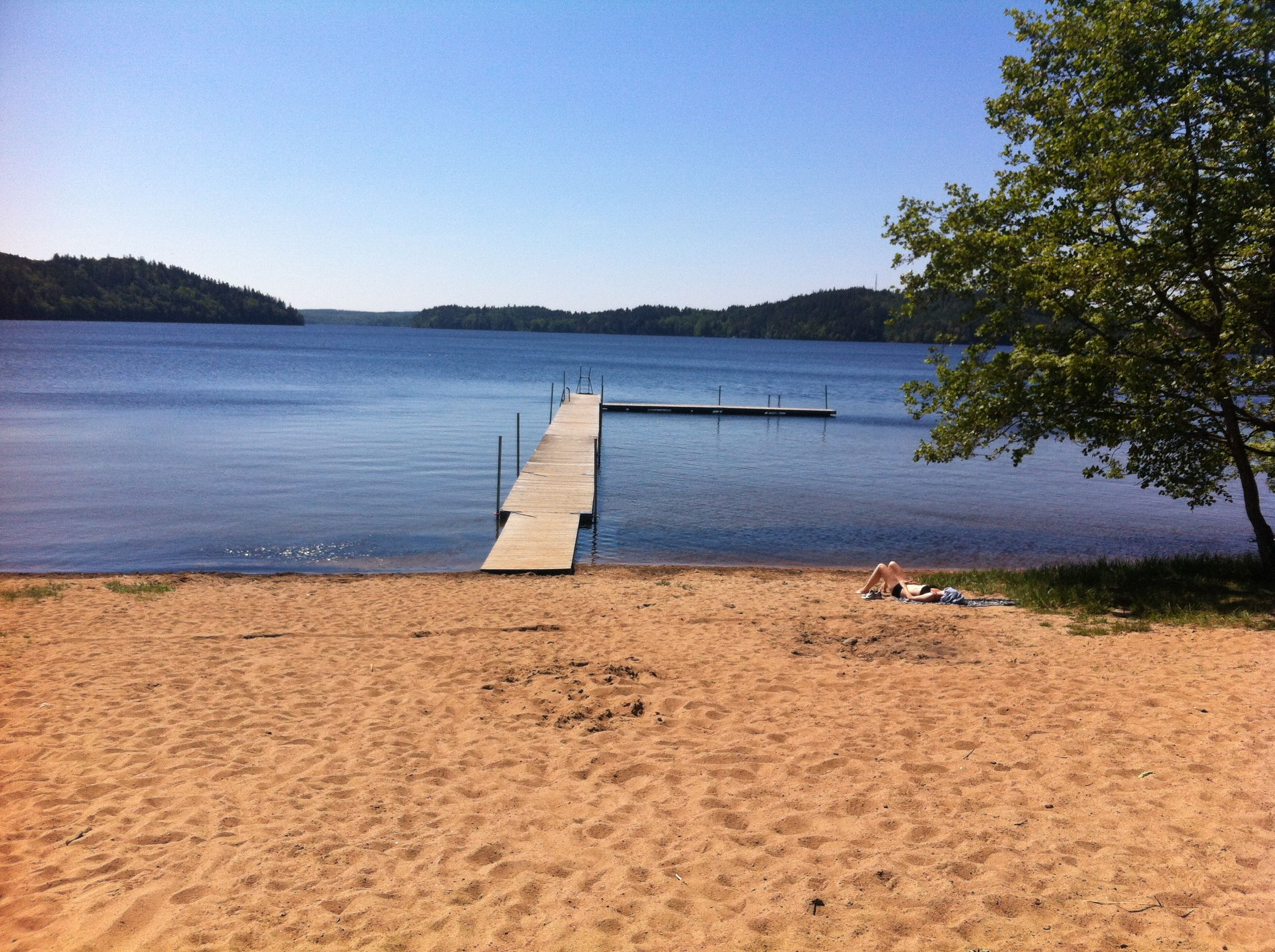
Ingared Beach

Ingared is a locality situated in Alingsås Municipality, Västra Götaland County, Sweden. It had 1,299 inhabitants in 2010.
