= Slottsbron =

- Location within Sweden
- Coordinates: 59°20′N 13°06′E
- Country: Sweden
- Province: Värmland
- County: Värmland County
- Municipality: Grums Municipality

Area
  - Total: 1.58 km^{2} (0.61 sq mi)

Population (31 December 2010)
  - Total: 1,039
  - Density: 656/km^{2} (1,700/sq mi)
- Time zone: UTC+1 (CET)
  - Summer (DST): UTC+2 (CEST)

Slottsbron is a locality situated in Grums Municipality, Värmland County, Sweden with 1,039 inhabitants in 2010.

== Sports ==
In Slottsbron there is a local sports club called Slottsbrons IF.

== Music ==
Sven-Ingvars is a music group from Slottsbron.
