= Segmon =

- Location within Sweden
- Coordinates: 59°17′N 13°01′E
- Country: Sweden
- Province: Värmland
- County: Värmland County
- Municipality: Grums Municipality

Area
  - Total: 1.31 km^{2} (0.51 sq mi)

Population (31 December 2010)
  - Total: 437
  - Density: 332/km^{2} (860/sq mi)
- Time zone: UTC+1 (CET)
  - Summer (DST): UTC+2 (CEST)

Segmon (Swedish pronunciation: [ˈsêːɡmuːn]) is a locality situated in Grums Municipality, Värmland County, Sweden with 437 inhabitants in 2010.
