= Skattkärr =

- Location within Sweden
- Coordinates: 59°25′N 13°38′E
- Country: Sweden
- Province: Värmland
- County: Värmland County
- Municipality: Karlstad Municipality

Area
  - Total: 2.07 km^{2} (0.80 sq mi)

Population (31 December 2010)
  - Total: 2,135
  - Density: 1,031/km^{2} (2,670/sq mi)
- Time zone: UTC+1 (CET)
  - Summer (DST): UTC+2 (CEST)

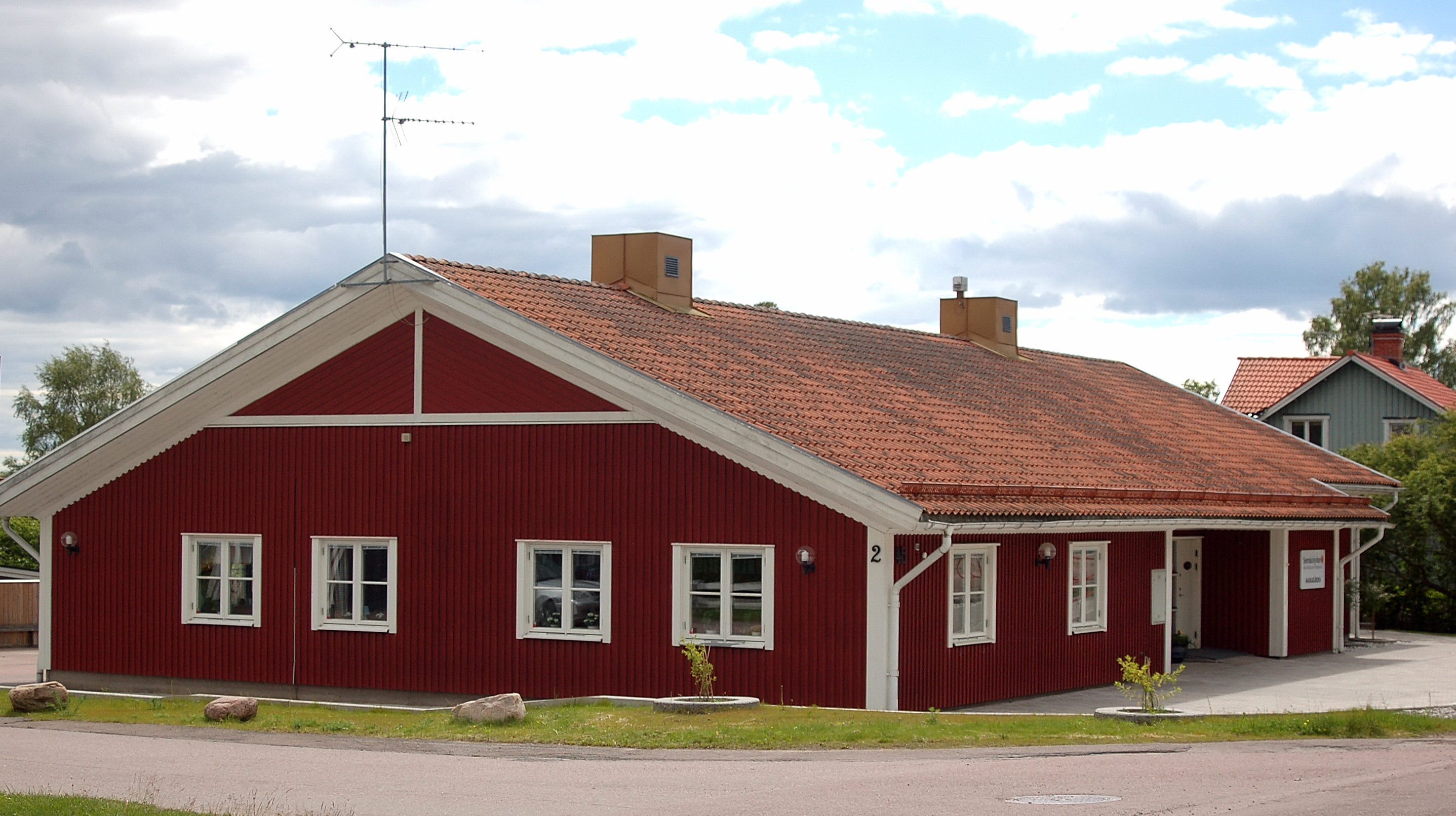
Mariagården, Skattkärr is the Church of Sweden's premises in Skattkärr

Skattkärr is a locality situated in Karlstad Municipality, Värmland County, Sweden. In 2010 it had 2,135 inhabitants, and in 2023 it had 1,960.
