= Sven-Erik Magnusson =

Swedish musician and member of Sven-Ingvars (1942–2017)

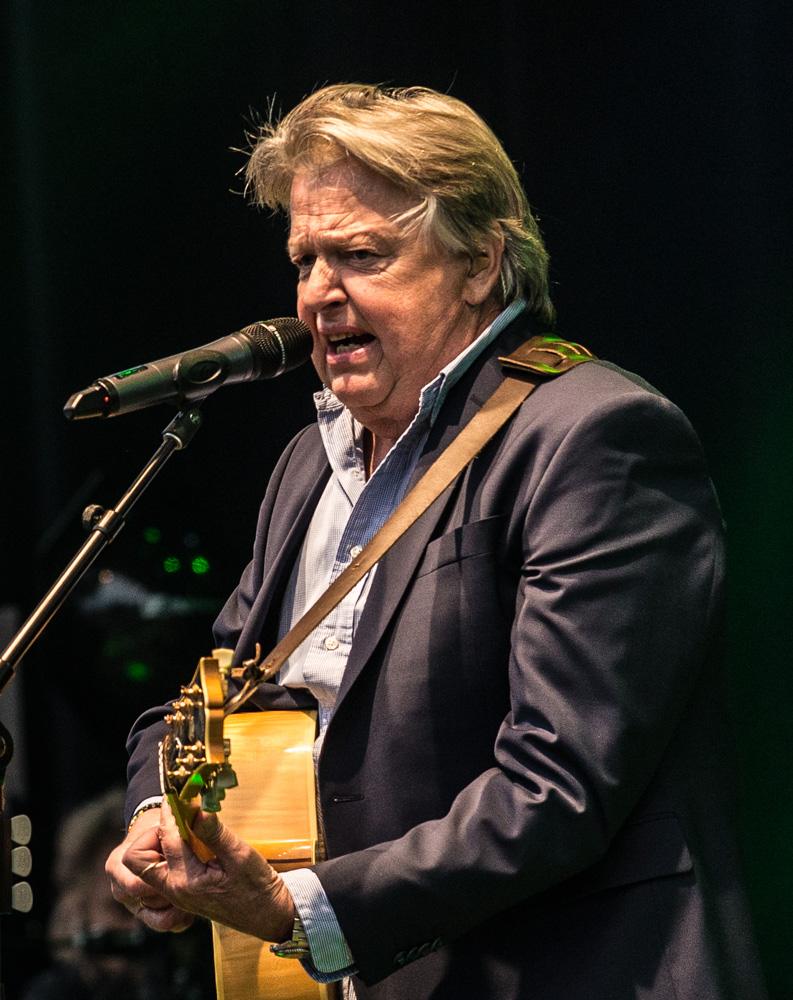
- Magnusson performing in 2016
- Born: Knut Sven-Erik Magnusson; 13 October 1942; Slottsbron, Sweden
- Died: 22 March 2017 (aged 74); Karlstad, Sweden
- Occupations: Singer; songwriter; musician
- Years active: 1956–2017
- Musical career
- Genres: Dansband; rock; pop
- Instruments: Vocals; guitar; saxophone; clarinet
- Label: Philips
- Formerly of: Sven-Ingvars

Knut Sven-Erik Magnusson (13 October 1942 – 22 March 2017) was a Swedish singer and musician known for being the lead singer of the band Sven-Ingvars that during their sixty-year history played many different types of popular music, and was at times regarded as a dansband. The band had its last tour during the summer of 2016 with their last show on 21 August that year in Blekinge.

He died on 22 March 2017, of prostate cancer.
