= Malin Berghagen =

Swedish actress

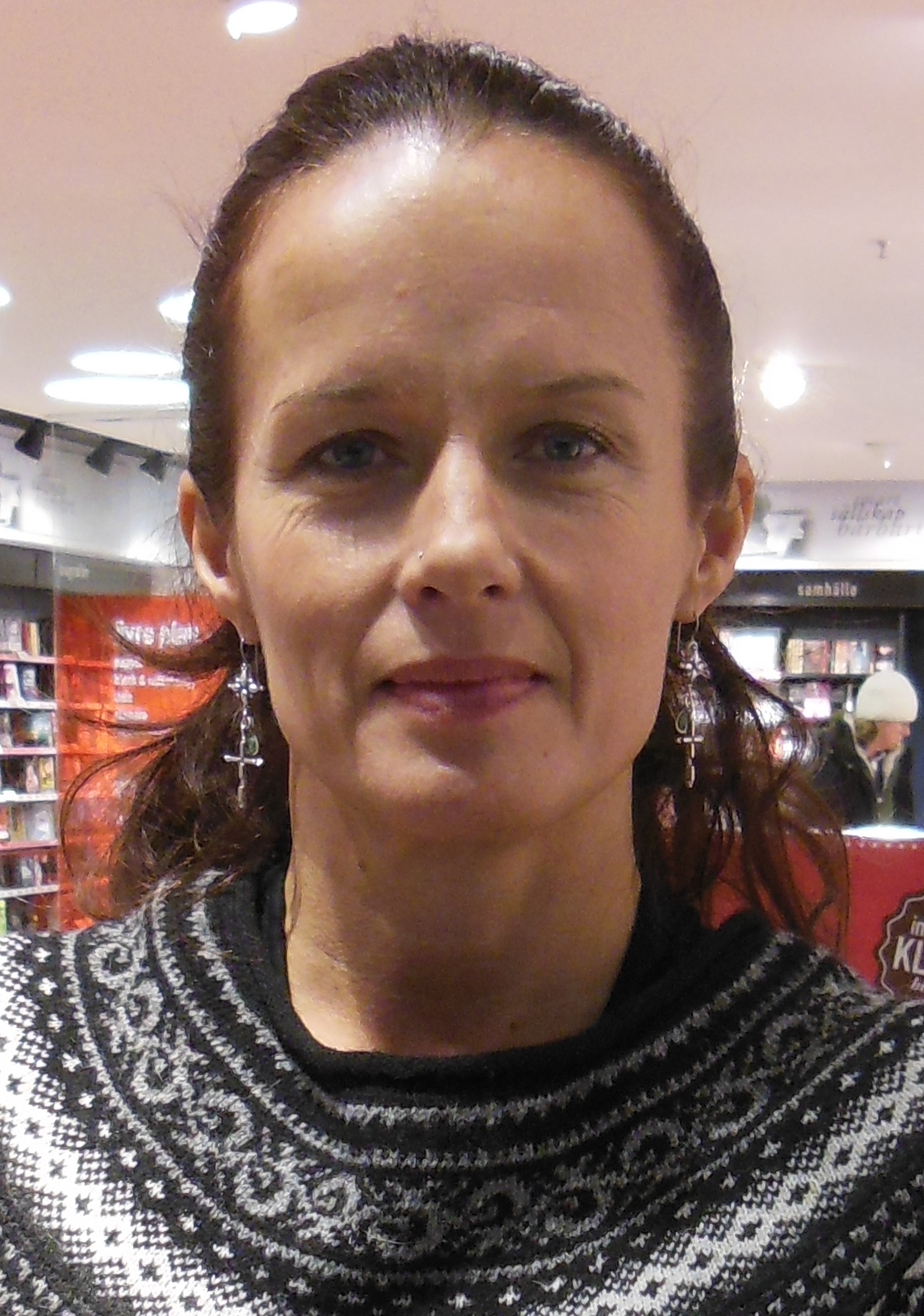
- Berghagen in 2012
- Born: Malin Birgitta Berghagen; 11 May 1966 (age 59); Sollentuna, Sweden
- Occupation: Actress
- Spouse: Tommy Nilsson (m. 1993; div. 2007)
- Parents: Lasse Berghagen (father); Barbro Svensson (mother)

Malin Birgitta Berghagen (formerly Berghagen Nilsson; born 11 May 1966) is a Swedish actress. She is daughter of Lasse Berghagen and Lill-Babs and half-sister to the TV host Kristin Kaspersen. In 1992, she received a Guldmask Award.

== Selected filmography ==
- 1992 – Luciafesten (TV)
- 1992 – Svart Lucia
- 1992 – Rederiet (TV)
- 2002 – Stora teatern (TV)
- 2004 – Det okända (TV)
- 2006 – Wallander – Luftslottet
- 2006 – Swedish language version of Cars as the voice of Sally Carrera
- 2011 - Cars 2
