= Lasse Berghagen =

Swedish singer, songwriter and actor (1945–2023)

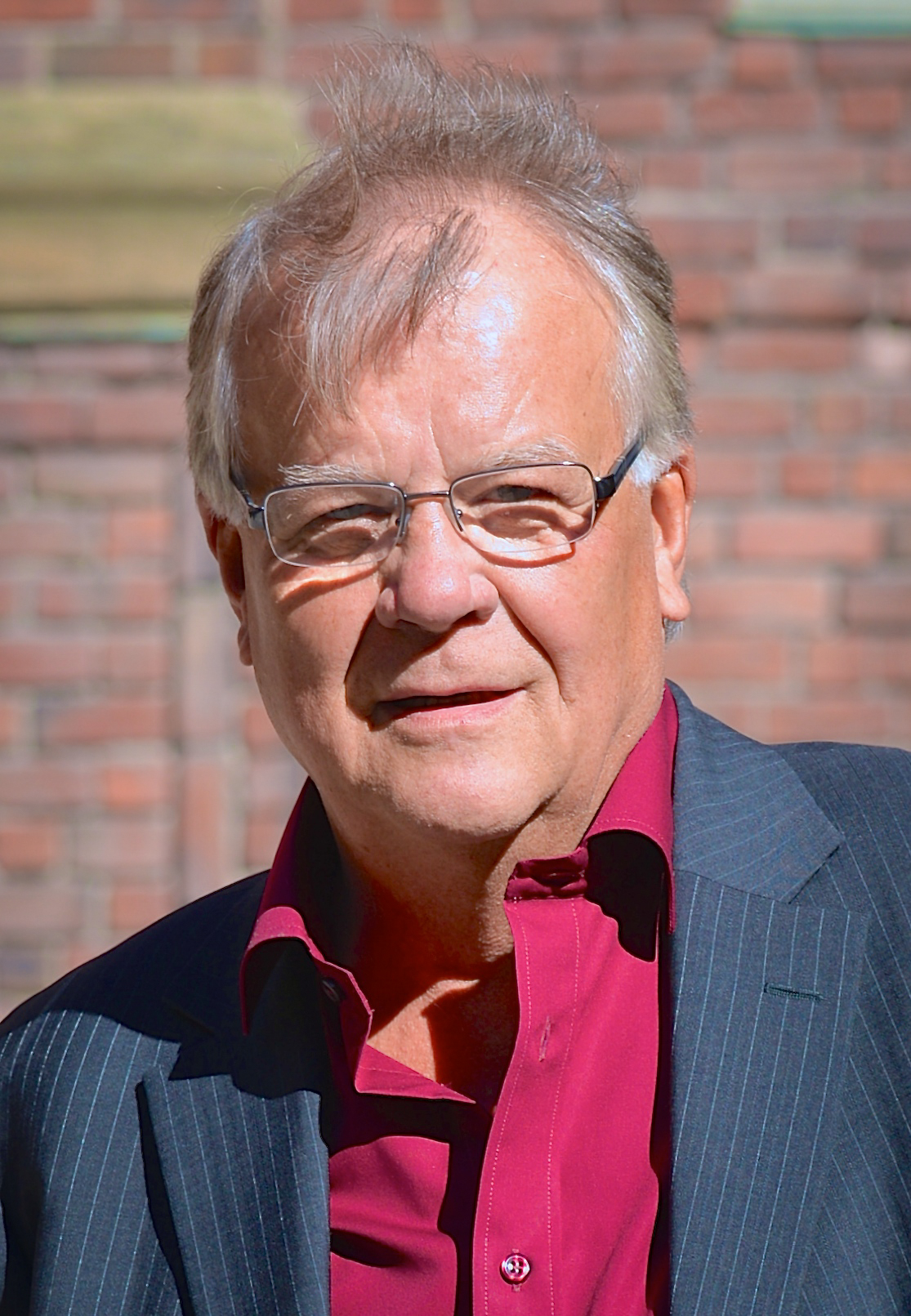
- Berghagen in 2014

Background information
- Born: Lars Nils Berghagen; 13 May 1945; Stockholm, Sweden
- Died: 19 October 2023 (aged 78) Stockholm, Sweden
- Genres: Pop; schlager
- Occupation: Singer
- Instrument: Acoustic guitar
- Years active: 1965–2023
- Spouses: Barbro Svensson (m. 1965; div. 1968); Eva Strand (m. 1976)

Lars Nils "Lasse" Berghagen (13 May 1945 – 19 October 2023) was a Swedish singer and songwriter. He represented Sweden in the Eurovision Song Contest 1975 with the song "Jennie, Jennie". He was also known for presenting Allsång på Skansen on Swedish television from 1994 up until 2003.

== Early and personal life ==
Berghagen was born in Stockholm on 13 May 1945. He was the son of nurse Britta (née Lindstedt; 1908–1997) and professor and dentist Nils Berghagen (né Nilsson; 1909–1995).

Berghagen was married to singer Lill-Babs between 1965 and 1968. Together, the couple had a daughter, Malin Berghagen, born in 1966. From 1976 onwards, he was married to Eva (née Strand), and the couple had a daughter, Maria Berghagen Enander, born in 1976.

== Career ==
=== Music career ===
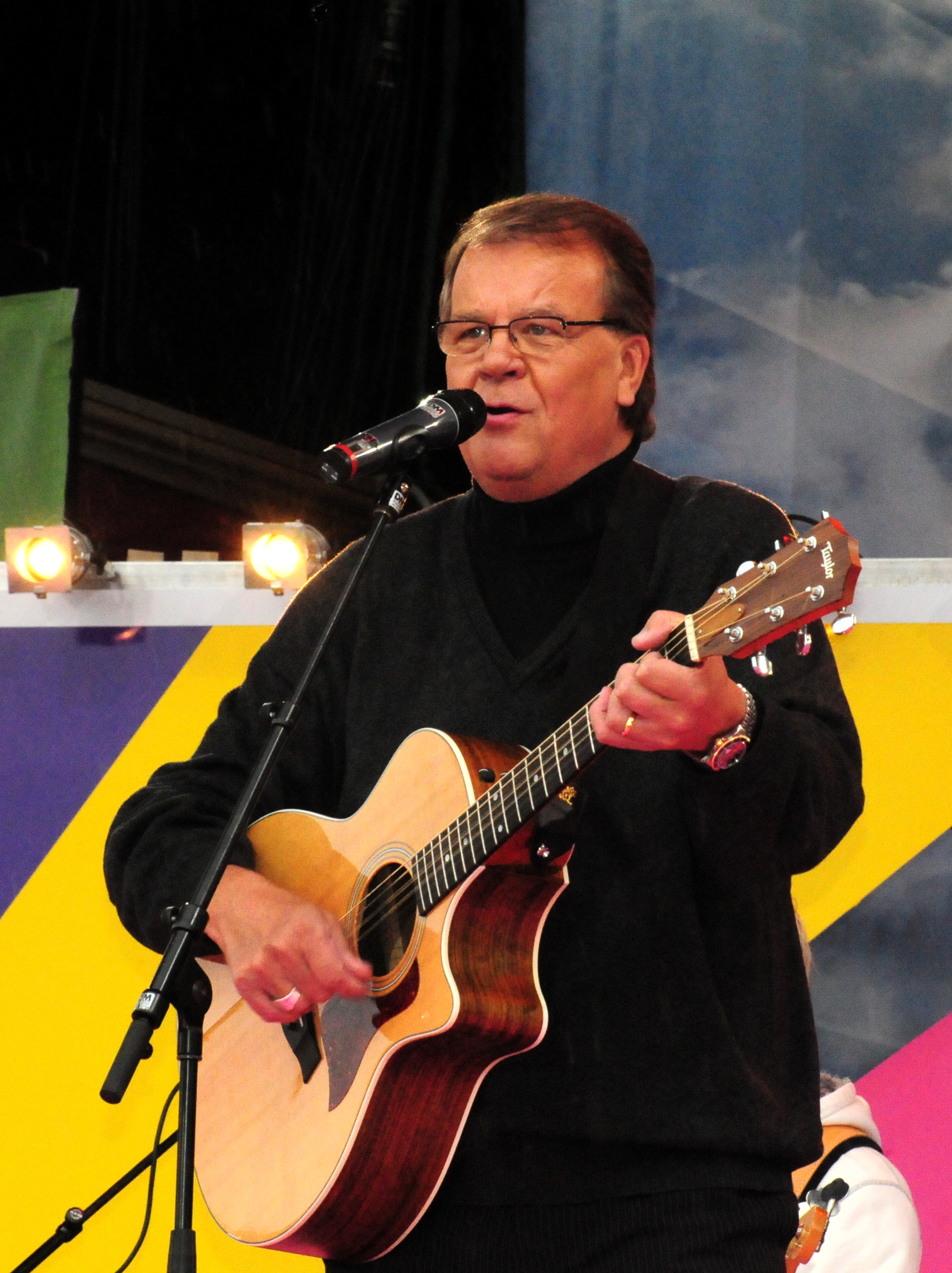
Lasse Berghagen at Sommarkrysset in June 2009.

Berghagen was discovered by record producer Curt Pettersson at the record label Karusell, at the age of 19 while Berghagen performed at an NTO party in Enköping. He released his first record in 1965.

His major breakthrough came in 1969, when he released the songs "Teddybjörnen Fredriksson" and "Gunga Gunga" which both charted on Svensktoppen. Other notable songs include "En enkel sång om frihet", "Hålligång i skogen" and "Du som vandrar genom livet". During the 1960s, Berghagen collaborated with Benny Andersson, and together they wrote songs like "Hej clown" (performed by Jan Malmsjö in Melodifestivalen 1969), and "Sagan om lilla Sofie", performed by Andersson's band Hep Stars.

In the 1970s, Berghagen participated in three consecutive Melodifestivalen. He finished seventh in 1973 with the song "Ding-Dong", second in Melodifestivalen 1974 with "Min kärlekssång till dig", and eventually won in Melodifestivalen 1975 with the song "Jennie, Jennie". Because of his win, he represented Sweden in the Eurovision Song Contest 1975, where he placed eighth. Berghagen also had a career in Germany where he released records, and appeared on German TV.

=== Television work ===
Between 1994 and 2003, Berghagen presented the SVT show Allsång på Skansen. The show increased in popularity during his time as a presenter, going from 600 thousand viewers to over two million during his run. He had earlier worked with SVT, hosting the shows Strapetz (1971), Positiva Klubben (1984) and Tjocka släkten (1991). In 2010, Berghagen appeared in the first season of the TV4 show Så mycket bättre.

=== Theatre and other ventures ===
Between 1968 and 1974, he performed with the Kar de Mumma revue at Folkan, where he played a charming tango dancer named Flirtiga Knut (Flirty Knut). He also starred in the comedy shows Sängkammarfars (1979) and Spanska flugan (1981) at the Vasateatern. In 1974, he did his first krogshow (bar show) Breda leenden at Berns. In 1985, he did his own musical at Chinateatern called Världens galenskap. He returned to Chinateatern in 2003 with the revue Chinarevyn co-starring with Magnus Härenstam and Sissela Kyle. Berghagen also acted in films like Firmafesten (1972), Dante, akta're för Hajen (1978) and Bert – den siste oskulden (1995).

During the 1980s, he was the chairman of the anti-drug association Föreningen Artister Mot Narkotika (FAMN). In 1993, he released a book of poems titled I mina blommiga sandaler (In my flower-patterned sandals).

== Awards ==
Berghagen was awarded for his work several times, amongst them the Lennart Hyland TV award, the S:t Eriksmedaljen, the Illis quorum meruere labores of the eighth size, and the Cornelis Vreeswijk-scholarship. He was also given the Kristallen award for his participation in Så mycket bättre, alongside his fellow cast members.

== The family ==
Berghagen was the son of professor and dentist Nils Berghagen (1909-1995) and nurse Britta, née Lindstedt (1908-1997). His father was born in Östersund and his mother in Svärdsjö, where the family owned a farm for many years. The architect Robert Berghagen was his uncle.

Berghagen was married in 1965-1968 to Barbro "Lill-Babs" Svensson and had the daughter Malin Berghagen, an actress, in 1966. From 1976 he was married to Eva Berghagen (born Strand 1952-2026), and in the same year they had their daughter Maria Berghagen Enander, who was an executive at coffee company Arvid Nordquist and CEO for two smaller companies. She later cohabited with the coach and lecturer Olof Röhlander.

== Death ==
Lasse Berghagen died from complications of heart surgery on 19 October 2023, at the age of 78. On 20 November 2023, he was buried inside the Hedvig Eleonora Church.

== Singles ==
Title	Year	Peak chart positions	Album
Title	Year	SWE	Album
"Tacka vet jag logdans"	1977	45	Non-album singles

== Studio albums ==
- Jul i vårt hus (2004)

== Filmography ==
- 1972: Firmafesten
- 1978: Dante akta're för Hajen
- 1995: Bert – den siste oskulden

Preceded by ABBA with "Waterloo"	Sweden in the Eurovision Song Contest; 1975	Succeeded by Forbes with "Beatles"
