= Sven-Ingvars =

Swedish pop/rock group

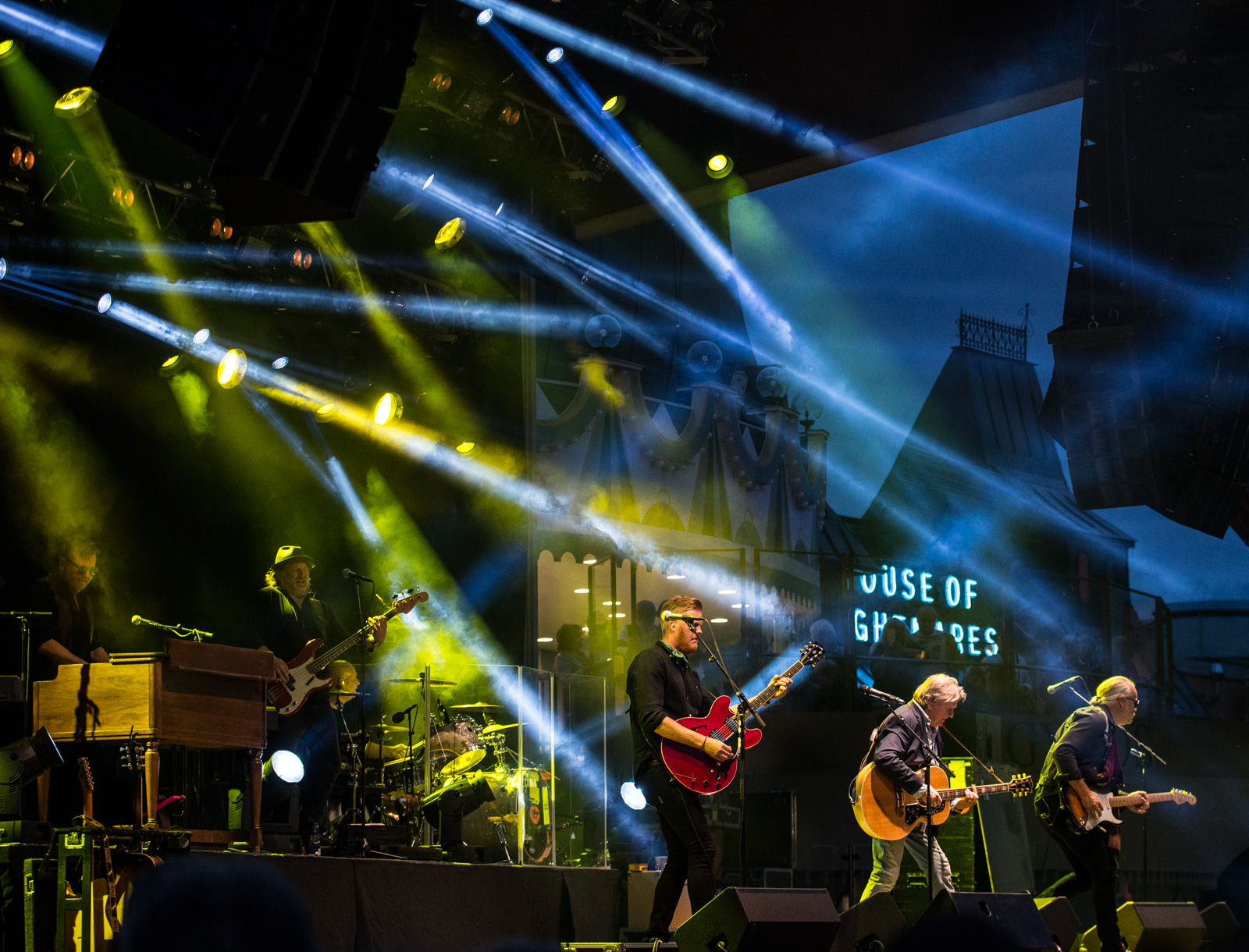

Background information
- Origin: Slottsbron
- Genres: Dansband music, pop, rock
- Years active: 1956–present
- Members: Oscar Magnusson; Klas Anderhell; Stefan Deland; Mats Billinger; Olle Nyberg
- Past members: Sven Svärd; Rune Bergman; Sven-Olof Petersson; Patrik Karlsson; Sven-Erik Magnusson; Thommy Gustafsson; Ingvar Karlsson; Staffan Ernestam

Sven-Ingvars is a Swedish pop/rock group from Slottsbron, Sweden. The band was formed in 1956 by Sven Svärd (drums), Ingvar Karlsson (guitar and accordion), Sven-Erik Magnusson (vocals, guitar, and clarinet). Later the band were joined first by Rune Bergman on bass guitar and then by Sven-Olof Petersson on tenor and baritone saxophone. The group made their first EP as a quartet in the early 1960s ("Let's Think About Living", "Guitar Boogie", and others). In the mid-1960s the group was popular in Sweden with hits such as "Te' dans me' Karlstatösera", "Ett litet rött paket", "Fröken Fräken", "Börja om från början", "Säj inte nej, säj kanske, kanske, kanske", "Vid din sida", Önskebrunnen and many others. They were so popular that in 1963, the opening act for the group was The Beatles.

== Biography ==
Ingvar Karlsson is the only remaining member of the band since the start in 1956. Since the 1970s, they have often been classified as a dansband. In 1990, Sven-Ingvars was awarded a Grammis for "Dansband of the year". In 2005, Sven-Ingvars was awarded the "special prize from the jury" at the Grammis awards.

Former member, Sven-Erik Magnusson, died on 22 March 2017 of cancer. The band continued with his son as a singer.

On 6 July 2019 keyboardist Thommy Gustafsson died at the age of 71.

== Members ==
Current members

- Oscar Magnusson – vocals, guitar (2006–)
- Mats Billinger – guitar, backing vocals (2021–)
- Stefan Deland – bass guitar, backing vocals (2009–)
- Klas Anderhell – drums (1998–) (Break from touring due to health issues)
- Olle Nyberg – organ, keyboards (2016–)

Live members

- Niclas Bäcklund – keyboards, saxophone, flute, tambourine, backing vocals, and guitar (2018–)
- Peter Damin - Drums

Former members

- Staffan Ernestam – guitar (2000–2021)
- Sven-Erik Magnusson – vocals, guitar, saxophone, clarinet (1956–2017) Ṫ
- Thommy Gustafson – keyboards, accordion (1987–2017) Ṫ
- Patrik Karlsson – bass guitar, guitar, vocals (1988–2009) Ṫ
- Ingvar Karlsson – guitar, accordion, keyboards (1956–2006)[14]
- Robin Bailey – drums, vocals (1968–1998)[15] Ṫ
- Hasse Svensson – bass guitar, vocals (1968–1987) Ṫ
- Sven-Olof Petersson – saxophone, flute, keyboards (1962–1987)
- Sven Svärd – drums (1956–1968) Ṫ
- Rune Bergman – bass guitar (1958–1967) Ṫ

== Discography ==
- Te' dans mä Karlstatösera (1963)
- Sven Ingvars (1964)
- Dans ikväll (1966)
- Nu är vi här... igen (1968)
- Sven-Ingvars i Carnegie Hall (1970)
- Sven-Ingvars i Frödingland (1971)
- Man borde inte sova (1972)
- På turné (1973)
- Allt går igen (1973)
- Guld (1975)
- Playa blanca (1976)
- Åh, va skönt (1977)
- Ett vykort från Sven-Ingvars (1978)
- Apropå (1980)
- Sven-Ingvars jubileums à la carte (1981)
- Å vilka tider (1982)
- Våga - vinn (1983)
- Exposé (1985)
- Nya vindar (1987)
- Sven-Ingvars kvartett rainbow music (1989)
- Dansparty (1992)
- Allt går igen (1993)
- Två mörka ögon (1994)
- På begäran (1994)
- Byns enda blondin (1994)
- En dröm om våren (1995)
- Du flicka med vind i ditt hår (1995)
- Septemberbarn (1995)
- Kärlekens alla färger (1995)
- Lika ung som då (1996)
- Hus till salu (1997)
- Nio liv (1998)
- Älskar du mig (1999)
- Retro aktiv (2000)
- Här nere på jorden (2001)
- Musik vi minns (2003)
- Guld & Glöd (2005)
