= Alessandro Ripellino =

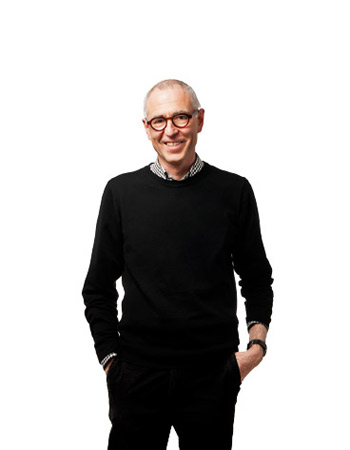
- Born: 1957 (age 68–69); Rome, Italy
- Occupation: Architect
- Awards: Swedish Concrete Federation (Svensk Betongs arkitekturpris); International Galvanizing Award; Utmärkt Svensk Form
- Practice: Rosenbergs Arkitekter
- Buildings: Lindhagsskrapan; Rica Talk Hotel

Alessandro Ripellino (born 1957, Rome, Italy) is an Italian-born architect who has been working in Sweden since 1982. He is both a Swedish and Italian licensed architect.

Ripellino has won numerous awards for his work including Stockholm City Council's building of the year award (Årets Stockholmsbyggnad), the annual architectural award of the Swedish Concrete Federation (Svensk Betongs arkitekturpris) and an award for outstanding Swedish design (Utmärkt Svensk Form) from the Swedish Society of Crafts and Design which promotes Swedish design within Sweden and abroad.

Ripellino graduated from the Faculty of Architecture of the University of Rome and since 1992 has co-owned and co-led the company Rosenbergs Arkitekter with fellow architect Inga Varg. His work ranges from complex urban planning and civic building projects to interior design projects to light and neon design.

Ripellino is the son of Italian author Angelo Maria Ripellino and Czech Ela Hlochóva. He speaks five languages: Swedish, Italian, English, French and Czech.

== Biography ==
Whilst studying at the University of Rome (Università di Roma La Sapienza) Ripellino won a scholarship to Sweden’s KTH Royal Institute of Technology (Kungliga Tekniska Högskolan) hosted by Professor Bengt Hidemark. After studying in Rome under professors M.L. Anversa and L. Thermes Ripellino graduated in architecture and technology and returned to Sweden to begin working with Swedish architect Lennart Bergström. After three years with Bergström, Ripellino began working at Rosenberg & Stål Arkitektkontor where he became a part-owner with Inga Varg.

Today the company is named Rosenbergs Arkitketer. During his time at the firm Ripellino has been responsible for, amongst other work, building projects like the Lindhagsskrapan high-rise in the Kvarteret Lusten district of Stockholm, the high-rise Rica Talk Hotel next to Stockholmsmässan exhibition halls, Bankhus 90 - office buildings of the leading Nordic bank SEB (Skandinaviska Enskilda Banken AB), major urban development projects like Västra City and Täby Parkstad, as well as interior design projects like Hotel Birger Jarl.

Ripellino is also known for his work on lighting design, and design of lighting fixtures and furnitures. Since 1998 he has worked with the ongoing creative architectural development of the large exhibition complex Stockholmsmässan. In 2009 Ripellino developed proposals for Stockholmsfyren, the tallest residential high-rise in Stockholm. He has been a member of the jury in numerous architecture competitions and is a much sought-after lecturer in architecture and city planning.

=== Awards ===
- 2012: Nominated for Lindhagsskrapan building in Stockholm City Council’s building of the year award (Årets Stockholmsbyggnad)
- 2012: Nominated for Lindhagsskrapan building in the Swedish Concrete Federation’s annual architecture award (Svensk Betongs arkitekturpris)
- 2012: Winner of the International Galvanizing Awards for the AE-Hallen section of the exhibition complex Stockholmsmässan
- 2008: Winner of the architecture award of the Federation of Swedish Glazing Contractors (Glasbranschförengingen glaspris) for the Rica Talk Hotel
- 2006: Winner of the Stockholm Region Heritage Federation’s architecture award (Stockholm läns hembygdsförbund) for Rica Talk Hotel
- 2006: Winner of the Swedish, West Sweden and South Sweden prize for best lighting from Swedish lighting association Svenska Belysningssällskapet, who promote knowledge, creativity and wider appreciation in the field of lighting. Prize awarded for Rica Talk Hotel.
- 1993: Light fixture Stockholmspendel wins outstanding Swedish design award (Utmärkt Svensk Form) from the Swedish Society of Crafts and Design which promotes Swedish design within Sweden and abroad
- 1992: Winner of the architecture award of the Betongelementföreningen for the SEB office building Bankhus 90 in Rissne

=== A selection of work ===
- Lindhagsskrapan
- Rica Talk Hotel
- SEB office building Bankhus 90, in Rissne
- Västra city
- Täby Parkstad
- Stockholmsmässan exhibition center, Älvsjö
- Ericsson micro-electronics factory in Kista
- Hotel Birger Jarl

== See also ==
- Rosenbergs Arkitekter
