= Natten tänder ljus på himlen =

Single by Carina Jaarnek
- A-side: "Natten tänder ljus på himlen"
- B-side: "Rör vid mig" ("Read My Lips")
- Released: 1986
- Genre: Christmas, schlager
- Label: Glendisc
- Songwriters: Lasse Andersson, Cecilia von Melen

Natten tänder ljus på himlen is a Christmas song written by Lasse Andersson and Cecilia von Melen. Lyrical, the song depicts the many stars seen at night at Christmastimes. Several artists and groups have recorded the song.

Carina Jaarneks orkester recorded the song, and released it as a single in 1986.

Carina Jaarnek also recorded the song with Alfstarz, scoring a Svensktoppen hit between 21 December 1986-4 January 1987, where it ended up at 8th respective 7th position.

Jan Malmsjö recorded the song on his 1987 Christmas album "Låt mig få tända ett ljus", scoring a Svensktoppen hit for seven weeks during the period 6 December 1987-10 January 1988, peaking at 7th position.

Christer Sjögren recorded the song on his 2000 Christmas album "Ett julkort från förr".
