= Inga Varg =

Swedish architect (born 1952)

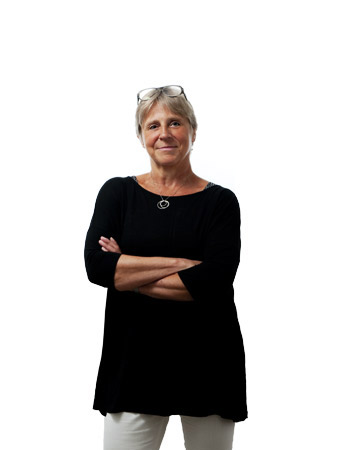
- Born: December 28, 1952 (age 73); Bergslagen, Sweden
- Occupation: Architect
- Awards: Kasper Salin-priset; Swedish Concrete Federation (Svensk Betongs arkitekturpris)
- Practice: Rosenbergs Arkitekter
- Buildings: Tekniska Verken in Linköping; Flat Iron Building in Stockholm

Inga Varg (born 1952, Bergslagen, Sweden) is a Swedish architect. Amongst the awards Varg has won are the Swedish Concrete Federation’s annual architecture award (Svensk Betongs arkitekturpris) and the Swedish Association of Architects’ Kasper Salin Award (Kasper Salin-priset.)

She trained and qualified as an architect at the KTH Royal Institute of Technology School of Architecture (Arkitekturskolan Kungliga Tekniska Högskolan.) Since 1992 she has co-owned and co-led the company Rosenbergs Arkitekter with the Italian-born architect Alessandro Ripellino. Varg has worked on city planning, architecture and interior design projects.

== Biography ==
Directly after graduating in 1978 Varg began working at Swedish architect’s Lars Bryde’s firm Lars Brydes Arkitektkontor. During this time Inga Varg took part in a number of competitions, designing residential projects including the Täppan district of south-central Stockholm Södermalm. Varg began working at Rosenberg & Stål Arkitektkontor in 1983 and became co-owner and co-leader of the firm, today called Rosenbergs Arkitekter, in 1992.

During her career Inga Varg has lectured regularly at KTH Royal Institute of Technology School of Architecture (Arkitekturskolan Kungliga Tekniska Högskolan) on residential planning and drafting techniques (skissmetodik.) She has been a judge on the panels of many architecture competitions, including the Swedish Association of Architects’ Kasper Salin Award (Kasper Salin-priset), Stora Samhällsbyggarpriset, an annual award for civic and city planning projects in Sweden, and she has frequently been a judge on many of the competitions of the Swedish Association of Architects.

=== Awards ===
- 2010: Winner of the Swedish Concrete Federation’s annual architecture award (Svensk Betongs arkitekturpris) for the Flat Iron Building in Stockholm.
- 2010: Third place for Stockholm Flat Iron Building in Stockholm City Council’s building of the year award (Årets Stockholmsbyggnad 2012.)
- 2003: Nominated for the Swedish Association of Architects’ Kasper Salin Award (Kasper Salin-priset) for the newly built Zanderska huset, a training facility at medical university Karolinska institutet in Flemingsberg.
- 2000: Nominated for the Swedish Concrete Federation’s annual architecture award (Svensk Betongs arkitekturpris) for Ericsson R&D building in Mjärdevi Science Park, Linköping
- 1994: Winner of the prestigious Swedish Association of Architects’ Kasper Salin Award (Kasper Salin-priset) for the corporate headquarters of Nordic sustainable energy company Tekniska Verken in Linköping (awarded together with Gustaf Rosenberg.)

=== A selection of work ===
- Headquarters of Tekniska Verken in Linköping (together with Gustaf Rosenberg)
- Zanderska huset, training facility at medical university Karolinska institutet in Flemingsberg
- Sollentuna Swimming Center and Sports Hall, conversion and extension
- Flat Iron Building office block, Torsgatan, Stockholm
- Ericsson administration and research buildings in the Kabelverket district of Älvsjö (together with Gustaf Rosenberg)
- Planning proposal for 1400-apartment residential development in the Kabelverket district of Älvsjö
- Norrviksstrand, Sollentuna
- Tyresö Gymnasium
- kv. Grimman, Södermalm

== See also ==
- Rosenbergs Arkitekter
