= Christer Sjögren sjunger Sinatra =

Studio album by Christer Sjögren
- Released: January 29, 2014
- Genre: jazz, schlager
- Label: Frituna

Christer Sjögren chronology
Lotta & Christer	Christer Sjögren sjunger Sinatra

Christer Sjögren sjunger Sinatra is a 2014 Christer Sjögren album of Frank Sinatra songs.

== Track listing ==
1. For Once in My Life
2. Strangers in the Night
3. Fly Me to the Moon
4. Smile
5. Summer Wind
6. The Lady is a Tramp
7. As Time Goes By
8. Something
9. New York, New York
10. Nancy
11. I Got You Under My Skin
12. It Was a Very Good Year
13. My Way

== Charts ==
Chart (2014)	Peak position
Sweden (Sverigetopplistan)	1
