= King Creole (disambiguation) =

King Creole can refer to:

- King Creole, a 1958 film starring Elvis Presley
  - "King Creole" (song), a song by Elvis Presley from the film King Creole
  - King Creole (soundtrack), an album by Elvis Presley, containing the soundtrack to the film King Creole
- King Creole (Christer Sjögren album)
