= Love Me Tender =

Love Me Tender may refer to:

== Elvis Presley media ==
- "Love Me Tender" (song), a 1956 song by Elvis Presley, adapted from the tune of the 1861 American Civil War song "Aura Lee"
  - Love Me Tender (1956 film), a 1956 film featuring Elvis Presley, named after the song
    - Love Me Tender (EP), an EP by Elvis Presley, containing songs from the above-mentioned 1956 film Love Me Tender

== Music ==
- Love Me Tender (Barb Jungr album), 2005
- Love Me Tender (Christer Sjögren album), 2005
- Love Me Tender (B.B. King album), 1982
- Love Me Tender, a 1987 album by Nana Mouskouri

== Film ==
- Love Me Tender (2025 film), a French drama film by Anna Cazenave Cambet

== Television ==
- "Love Me Tender", an episode of the situation comedy series The Golden Girls
- ”Love Me Tender”, an episode of the 20th series of the UK/US children's TV series Thomas & Friends
