= Kramgoa låtar 2011 =

Studio album by Christer Sjögren
- Released: 22 June 2011
- Genre: Schlager
- Label: Mariann

Christer Sjögren chronology
En stjärna lyser i natt (2010)	Kramgoa låtar 2011 (2011)	Lotta & Christer (2012)

Kramgoa låtar 2011 is a studio album by Christer Sjögren, released on 22 June 2011.

== Track listing ==
1. Mötet
2. Natten tänder sina ljus
3. Det skrivs så många vackra ord
4. A Violin That Never Has Been Played
5. Meet Me in Heaven
6. Barndomsåren
7. Tack
8. Livet det har varit gott mot mej
9. Jag vill alltid ha dej som du är
10. Om du var min
11. Blue Bayou
12. Halvvägs till himlen
13. Jag vill andas samma luft som du
14. Ditt hjärtas röst

== Charts ==
=== Weekly charts ===
Chart (2011)	Peak position
Norwegian Albums (VG-lista)	26
Swedish Albums (Sverigetopplistan)	2

=== Year-end charts ===
Chart (2011)	Position
Swedish Albums (Sverigetopplistan)	15
