= Låt mig få tända ett ljus =

Studio album by Jan Malmsjö
- Released: 1987
- Genres: Christmas, schlager
- Length: 39.29
- Label: Little Big Apple

Låt mig få tända ett ljus is a 1987 Jan Malmsjö Christmas album, released on the Little Big Apple label to LP., cassette tape and CD

In 1991, the album was rereleased by the Mariann label to CD. and cassette tape.

In 1993, the album was once again rereleased. This time, the CD version was by the KM label. and the cassette tape by the Mariann label.

== Track listing ==
1. Låt mig få tända ett ljus (Schlafe, mein Prinzchen, schlaf ein)
2. Natten tänder ljus på himlen
3. Stilla natt (Stille Nacht, heilige Nacht)
4. Jag drömmer om en jul hemma
5. Vem är det barnet
6. Ser du stjärnan i det blå (When You Wish upon a Star)
7. Nu tändas tusen juleljus
8. Jul i Gamla stan (Christmas in New York)
9. Jul, jul, strålande jul
10. Varje människa har ett ljus (Mary's Boy Child)
11. En jul utan dig
12. Christmas medley

== Contributors ==
- Lasse Wellander - guitar
- Peter Ljung - keyboard
- Sam Bengtsson - bass
- Klas Anderhell - drums

== Chart positions ==
Chart (1987–1988)	Peak position
Sweden	5
