= Yngve Stoor =

Swedish singer, lyricist and composer (1912–1985)

- Born: 4 May 1912; Stora Kopparberg, Sweden
- Died: 3 October 1985 (aged 73) Älvsjö, Sweden
- Genres: Hawaii music, schlager
- Occupations: singer, lyricist, composer
- Instruments: mandolin, violin, Hawaii guitar

Hans Yngve Stoor (5 April 1912 – 3 October 1985) was a Swedish singer, lyricist and composer. One of his most famous recordings is the 1945 Christmas song "Sjömansjul på Hawaii".
