= Rosenbergs Arkitekter =

Swedish architecture firm

Rosenbergs Arkitekter AB

Practice information
- Key architects: Gustav Rosenberg & Hans Rosenberg later Inga Varg & Alessandro Ripellino
- Partners: None
- Founded: 1955 by Gustav Rosenberg Olle Stæl and Hans Rosenberg
- Location: Stockholm, Sweden

Rosenbergs Arkitekter is a Swedish architecture company founded in 1955 by Gustav Rosenberg and then Olle Stål and Hans Rosenberg, owned and led since 1992 by architects Alessandro Ripellino and Inga Varg. The company works with public and civic buildings, residential developments, work places, retail buildings, interiors and urban planning.

== Portfolio and activities ==
The company has built up a considerable reputation through carrying out large projects in a distinctive style of soft structuralism. Initially Rosenbergs worked predominantly with public buildings and large office blocks, but over the last couple of decades the company has broadened the range of its work to include city planning projects and large residential developments.

Some of their achievements include Lindhagsskrapan, a 24-storey residential tower block in the Kvarteret Lusten district of Stockholm; the award-winning Flat Iron Building at Norra Bantorget in central Stockholm; the Bankhus 90 building in Rissne, a key office building for Skandinaviska Enskilda Banken AB (SEB) one of Sweden’s major banks; the Tomteboda postterminalen building in Solna, one of the largest single buildings in Sweden and the corporate headquarters and main sorting office for Posten AB and PostNord AB, the Nordic region’s largest mail and logistics provider; the high-rise Rica Talk hotel in Stockholm and Stockholmsmässan, one of the country’s largest exhibition halls and conference centers, which Rosenberg’s has been responsible for the architectural creation and development of since the late 1990s.

Rosenbergs is currently working with many of the largest ongoing city planning projects taking place in Stockholm. Amongst other projects the company has submitted proposals for the expansion of the dense Västra city commercial area in central Stockholm; has won the contract for the urban redevelopment of the former racecourse area of Täby and won an open assignment to plan the conversion of the Södra Värtahamnen area of Stockholm into a new district. The company is also working on many ongoing housing projects currently under construction, including apartment blocks in Norra Djurgårdensstaden, Lilla Essingen and Telefonplan, residential high-rises in the tidningskvarteret district, Stadshagen and Borås, a residential tower block in Liljeholmen and residential conversions in the Kabelverket district of Älvsjö.

=== Awards for buildings designed by Rosenbergs Arkitekter ===
- 2012: Lindhagsskrapan building nominated for Stockholm City Council’s building of the year award (Årets Stockholmsbyggnad.)
- 2012: Lindhagsskrapan building nominated for Swedish Concrete Federation’s annual architecture award (Svensk Betongs arkitekturpris)
- 2012: AE-Hallen section of Stockholmsmässan wins International Galvanizing Awards
- 2010: Flat Iron Building wins Swedish Concrete Federation’s annual architecture award (Svensk Betongs arkitekturpris)
- 2009: Flat Iron Building nominated for Stockholm City Council’s building of the year award (Årets Stockholmsbyggnad 2012.)
- 2008: Rica Talk Hotel wins architecture award of the Federation of Swedish Glazing Contractors (Glasbranschförengingen glaspris.)
- 2006: Rica Talk Hotel wins Stockholm Regional Heritage Federation’s architecture award (Stockholm läns hembygdsförbund.)
- 2003: Zanderska huset, new training facility at medical university Karolinska institutet in Flemingsberg, nominated for the Swedish Association of Architects’ Kasper Salin Award (Kasper Salin-priset)
- 2000: Ericsson R&D building in Mjärdevi Science Park, Linköping nominated for Swedish Concrete Federation’s annual architecture award (Svensk Betongs arkitekturpris)
- 2000: Stockholmsmässan awarded sign of the year (årets skylt) prize by Stockholm City Council (a prize for the most beautiful and effective neon signage in the city) for an integrated solution built around the interaction of façade, signage and lighting.
- 1994: Tekniska Verken offices in Linköping win prestigious Swedish Association of Architects’ Kasper Salin Award (Kasper Salin-priset.)
- 1992: Bankhus 90 wins architecture award of the Betongelementföreningen.
- 1986: IBM General Services Center in Kista wins the Partek Höganäs Ceramics Award for the design and creation of its façade.
- 1982: Tomteboda postterminalen corporate headquarters for Posten AB wins Tengbomspriset.
- 1975: Sollentuna Swimming Center and Sports Hall wins Kasper Salin-priset, the Swedish Association of Architects’ Kasper Salin Award.

=== Notable projects ===
Specific buildings

- 2011 Lindhagsskrapan, Kvarteret Lusten
- 1999-2010 Stockholmsmässan; AE-hallen (2009), C-hallen (1999), B-galleriet (2010)
- 2011 Punkthus, Hökarängen
- 2010 Entréhuset, Marievik
- 2008 Flat Iron Building, Norra Bantorget, Västra city
- 2008 Apartment buildings in the Sjöfarten district of Hammarby Sjöstad
- 2006 Rica Talk Hotel, Älvsjö
- 2002 IT-universitetet Forum
- 2002 Elektronikbyn, Kista
- 2002 Zanderska huset, Campus Huddinge
- 1993 Tekniska Verken, Linköping
- 1992 Bankhus 90, Rissne
- 1985 IBM General Services Center Kista
- 1983 Tomteboda postterminal, Solna
- 1972 Sollentuna Swimming Center and Sports Hall

Conversions, rebuilds and interiors

- Sollentuna fria gymnasium (Sollentuna independent High School)
- Hotel Birger Jarl
- The Slussen Hilton, exterior lighting.

City planning

- Täby Parkstad, new residential district on the site of the old racecourse.
- Nya Klara Västra city, analysis, exploration and proposals for new building possibilities in dense area of central Stockholm.
- Munksjön in Jönköping, new district.
- Gubbängsfältet, residential and sports buildings.
- Södra Värtahamnen, conversion into residential area
- Studio Ulvsunda, residential properties in old industrial area
- Gullmarsplan, a central meeting place in South Stockholm
- Stockholmsfyren, draft proposals for Stockholm’s tallest building, in the Ropsten area.

== Images ==
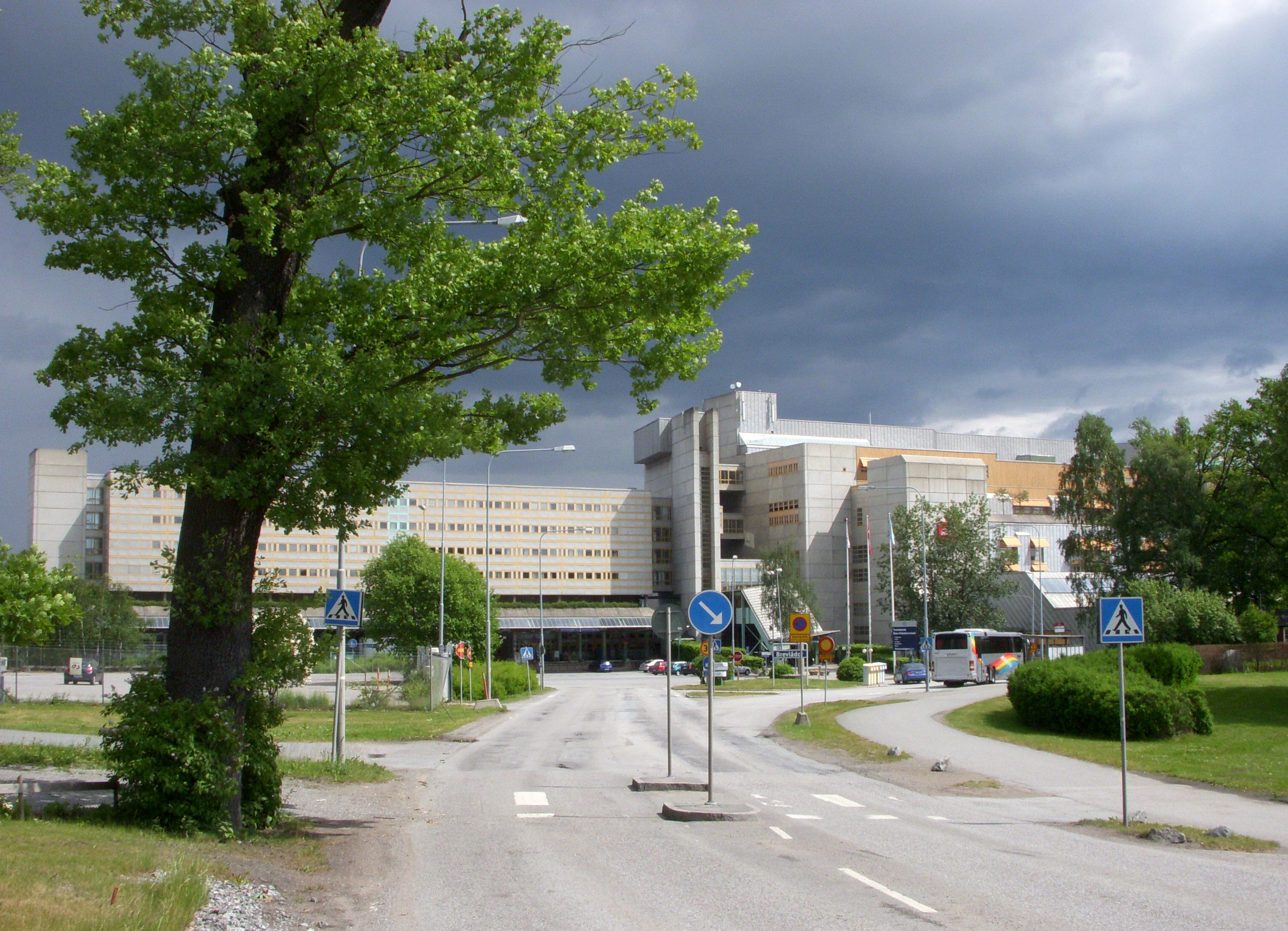
Tomteboda postterminal

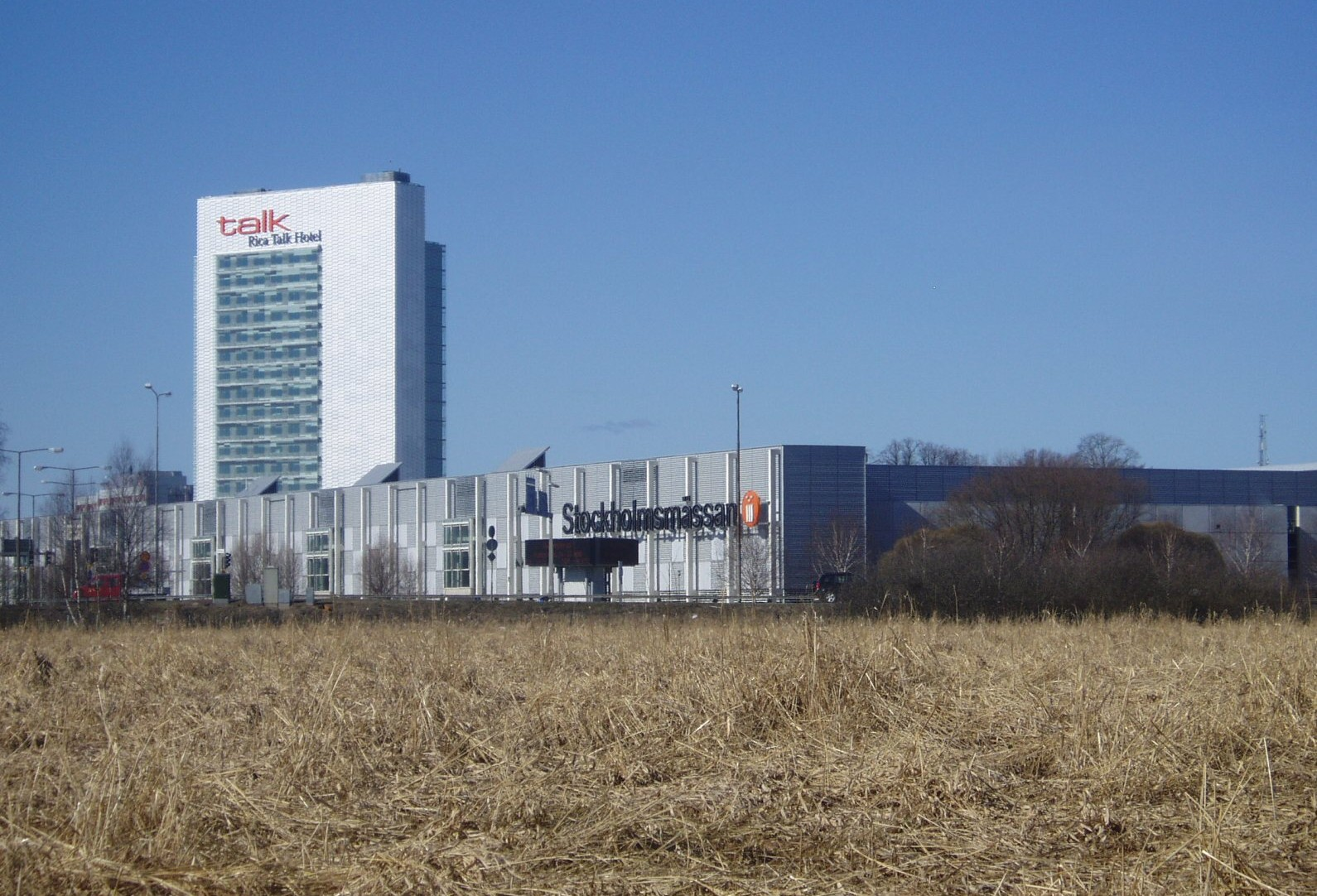
Rica Talk Hotel

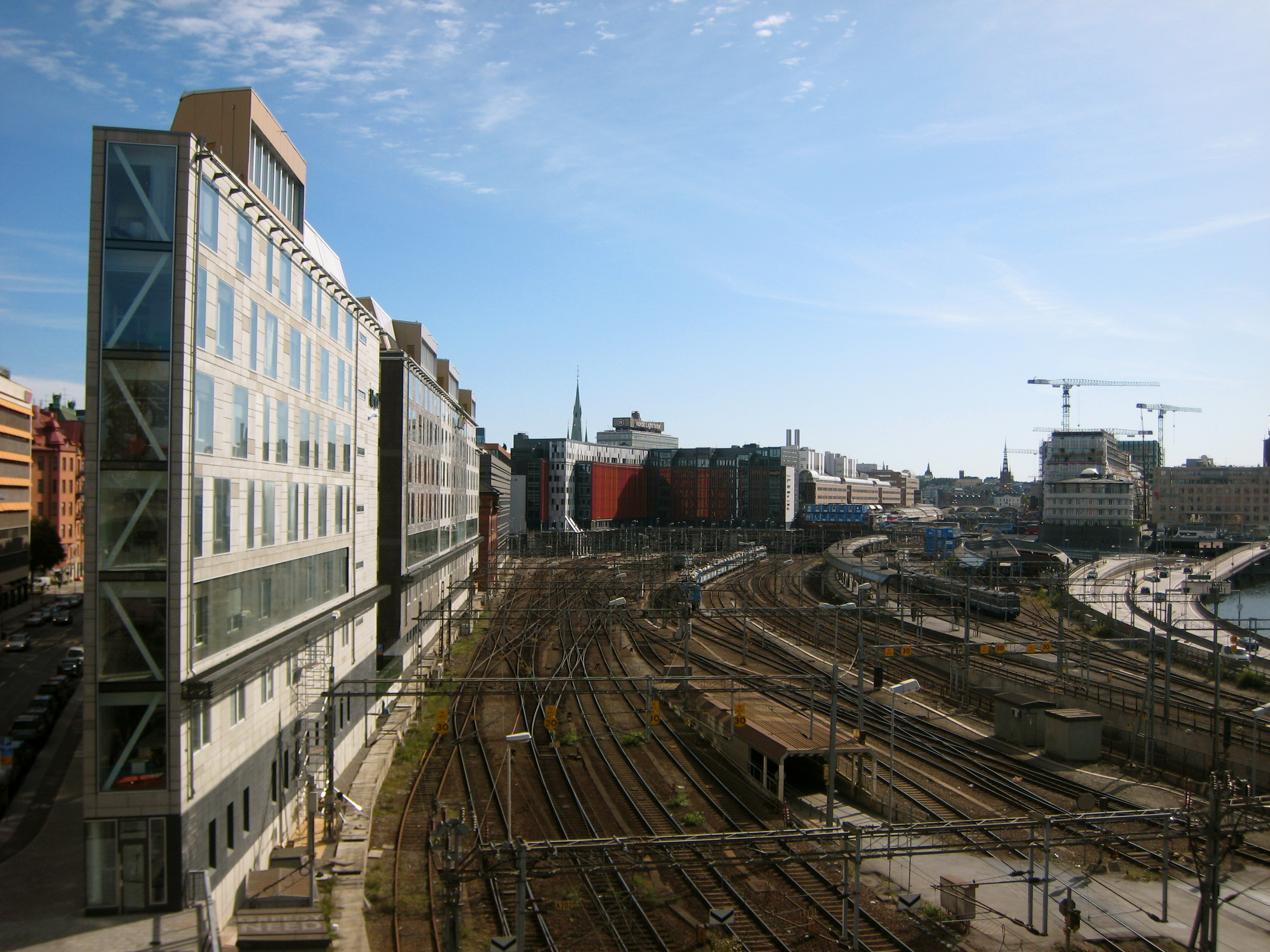
Flat Iron Building

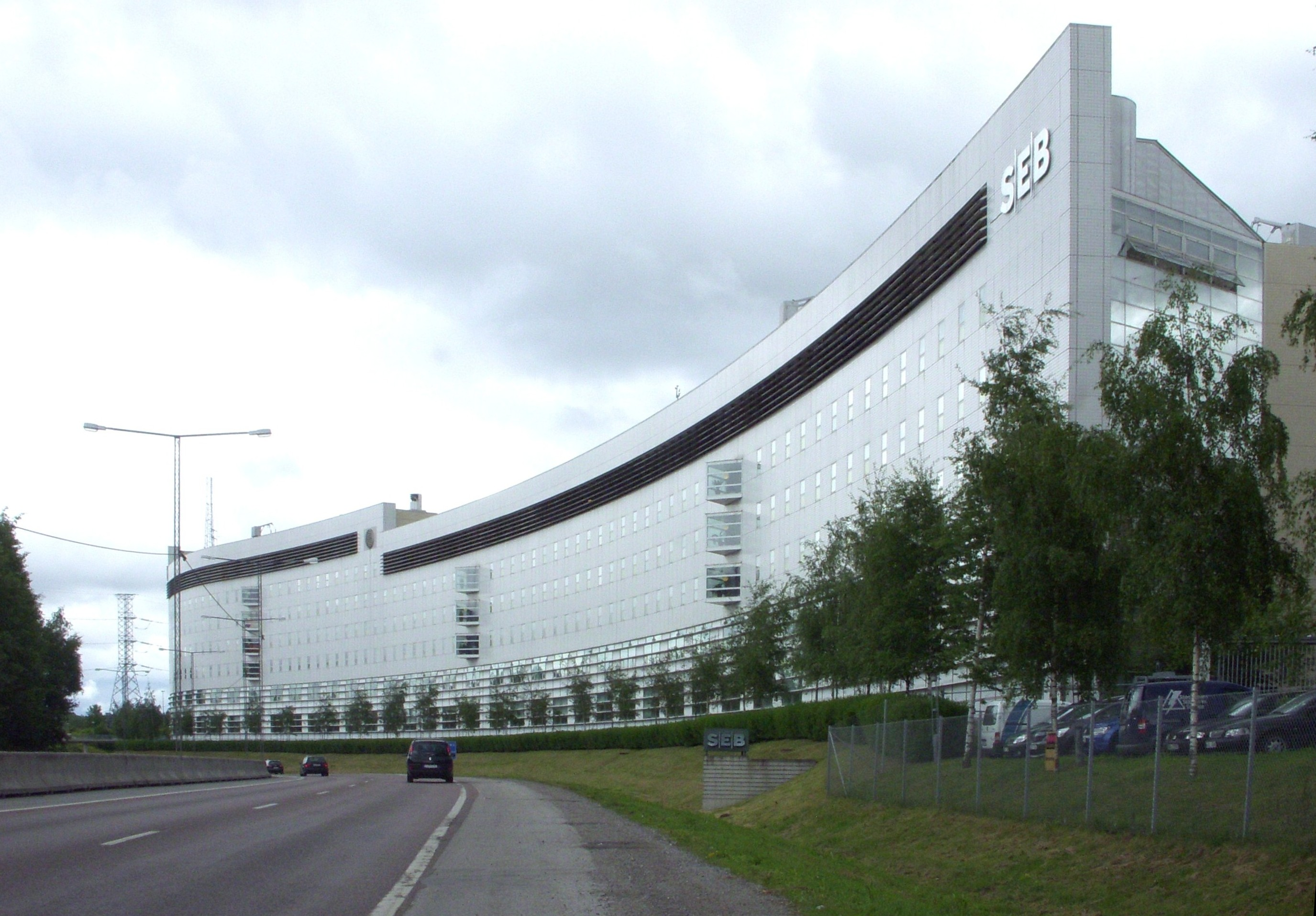
Bankhus 90

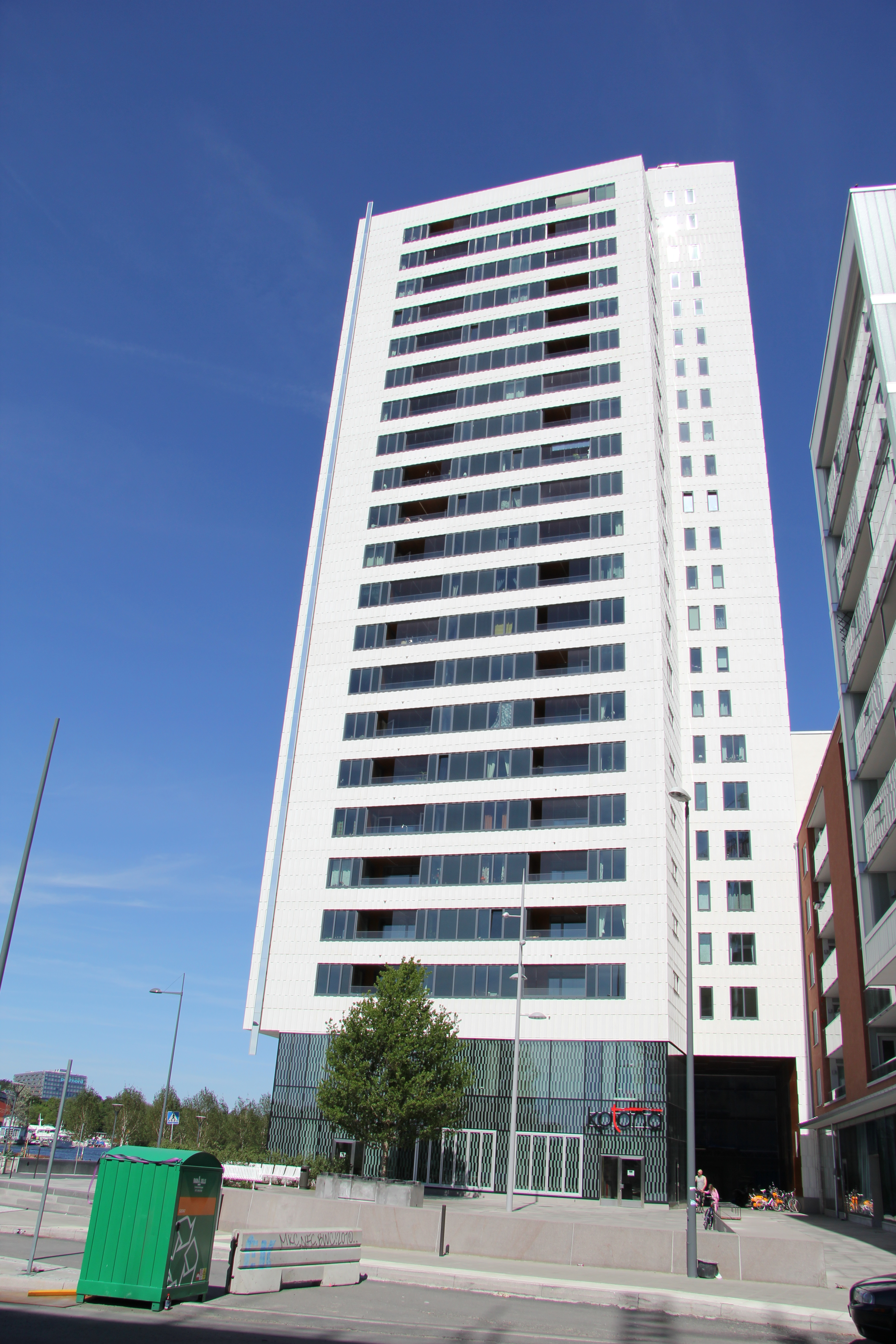
Lindhagsskrapan
