= När ljusen ska tändas därhemma (album) =

Studio album by Christer Sjögren
- Released: November 1994
- Recorded: 1994
- Genre: Christmas
- Length: 39 minutes
- Label: NMG

Christer Sjögren chronology
Andliga sånger 2 (1993)	När ljusen ska tändas därhemma (1994)	Varför är solen så röd (1996)

När ljusen ska tändas därhemma is a Christer Sjögren Christmas album, released to CD and cassette tape before Christmas 1994, and VHS before the 1995 Christmas. At the Swedish album chart it peaked at 25th position.

The song "Min önskejul" was recorded by Sanna Nielsen on her 1997 Christmas album with the same name.

== Track listing ==
=== Side 1 ===
1. När ljusen tändas därhemma (When It's Lamp Lighting Time in the Valley)
2. Ser du stjärnan i det blå (When You Wish upon a Star)
3. O helga natt (Cantique de noël)
4. Sjömansjul på Hawaii
5. Ett barn är fött på denna dag
6. Julenatt - silvernatt
7. Blue Christmas

=== Side 2 ===
1. Bella Notte
2. O du saliga, o du heliga (O du fröhliche)
3. Min önskejul
4. Vår vackra vita vintervärld (Winter Wonderland)
5. När det lider mot jul (Det strålar en stjärna)
6. Vi längtar efter julen
7. Allt som saknas är du

== Contributors ==
- Christer Sjögren: vocals
- Peter Ljung: Keyboards
- Klas Anderhell: drums
- Rutger Gunnarsson: bass
- Lasse Westmann: guitar

== Charts ==
Chart (1994)	Peak position
Sweden (Sverigetopplistan)	25
