= Ett barn är fött på denna dag =

- Christmas song
- Written: 1617; 1817
- Text: by Olaus Martini; by Johan Olof Wallin (amendments)
- Language: Swedish
- Based on: "Vom Himmel hoch, da komm ich her"
- Published: 1913

"Ett barn är fött på denna dag" ("A child is born this day") is a Swedish Christmas song.

== Overview ==
"Ett barn är fött på denna dag" was originally an amended version of Martin Luther's hymn "Vom Himmel hoch, da komm ich her". The Swedish language lyrics were written by Olaus Martini in 1617 and revised by Johan Olof Wallin in 1817. The song lyrics are about the birth of Jesus. The melody of the song is based on a German folk melody.

== Publication ==
- Kyrklig sång, 1913
- Number 72 of Kyrklig sång 1928
- Number 42 of Svensk söndagsskolsångbok 1929 under the lines "Advents- och julsånger".
- Number 37 of Guds lov 1935 under the lines "Advents- och julsånger".
- Number 63 of 1937 års psalmbok under the lines "Jul" with the first verse, Av himlens höjd oss kommet är, and the second verse Ett barn är fött på denna dag.
- Number 719 i Kyrkovisor 1960 under the lines "Jul".
- Smått å Gott, 1977 (as "Ett barn är fött", credited as "medeltida julsång"( "Medieval Christmas song)
- Number 126 of Den svenska psalmboken 1986, 1986 års Cecilia-psalmbok, Psalmer och Sånger 1987, Segertoner 1988 and Frälsningsarméns sångbok 1990 under the lines "Jul".
- Number 2 of Sions Sånger 1981 under the lines "Jul".
- Number 113 of Lova Herren 1987 under the lines "Advents- och julsånger".
- Julens önskesångbok, 1997, under the lines "Traditionella julsånger", credited as "Melodi från medeltiden""( " Medieval tune).
- Barnens svenska sångbok, 1999, under the lines "Året runt".

== Recordings ==
- Artur Erikson recorded the song in 1970 for his Christmas album "Det hände sig vid Davids by".
- Christer Sjögren recorded the song on his 1994 Christmas album "När ljusen ska tändas därhemma".

== Sources ==
- Palm Anders, Stenström Johan, ed. (1999). Barnens svenska sångbok. Bonnier.
