= En stjerne skinner i natt =

Song by Oslo Gospel Choir
- Language: Norwegian
- Released: 1992
- Genre: Christmas
- Songwriters: Eyvind Skeie; Tore W. Aas

"En stjerne skinner i natt" ("A Star Shines Tonight") is a Christmas song written by Eyvind Skeie and Tore W. Aas. It was originally recorded on the 1992 album Tusen julelys by the Oslo Gospel Choir.

The song has also been recorded in Swedish, as "En stjärna lyser i natt" with lyrics by Lasse Kronér and recorded by Triple & Touch on their third studio album De 3 vise männen, and by Christer Sjögren on his tenth studio album En stjärna lyser i natt, and also by Carola Häggkvist on her tenth studio album Jul i Betlehem, as "En stjärna lyser så klar", with lyrics by Ingela Forsman.
