= Ett julkort från förr =

Studio album by Christer Sjögren
- Released: November 17, 2000
- Genre: Christmas
- Label: NMG

Christer Sjögren chronology
Varför är solen så röd (1996)	Ett julkort från förr (2000)	För kärlekens skull (2003)

Ett julkort från förr is a 2000 Christer Sjögren Christmas album, released to CD and cassette tape. At the album charts, it peaked at number three in Sweden and number 19 in Norway between 2000–2002.

== Track listing ==
1. Nu tändas tusen juleljus
2. Natten tänder ljus på himlen
3. Stilla natt (Stille Nacht, heilige Nacht)
4. The Christmas Song
5. När juldagsmorgon glimmar
6. Advent
7. Ett julkort från förr (An Old Christmas Card)
8. Det brinner ett ljus för en gammal sång
9. Härlig är Jorden (Dejlig er Jorden)
10. I'll Be Home for Christmas
11. Barnet i Betlehem (Mary's Boy Child)
12. När i kväll jag tänder ett ljus
13. Säg, vem är han? (What Child is this?)
14. Glory, Glory Halleluja (An American Trilogy)

== Contributors ==
- Christer Sjögren – vocals
- Rutger Gunnarsson – guitar
- Lasse Wellander – guitar
- Lasse Persson – drums
- Per Lindvall – drums
- Peter Ljung – keyboard

== Charts ==
Chart (2000)	Peak position
Norwegian Albums (VG-lista)	19
Swedish Albums (Sverigetopplistan)	3
