= Jul i Kvinnaböske =

Studio album by Hasse Andersson
- Released: 1986
- Recorded: Sonet Studios, October 1986
- Genre: Christmas, country
- Length: 49 minutes
- Label: Sonet
- Producer: Lennart Sjöholm

Hasse Andersson chronology
Tie bilder (1985)	Jul i Kvinnaböske (1986)	Mellan himmel och jord (1987)

Jul i Kvinnaböske is a 1986 Christmas album by Hasse Andersson, accompanied by the Kvinnaböske Band, and many of the songs have lyrics related to the idea of peace. The album peaked at number 27 on the Swedish Albums Chart. In 1987, it was re-released to CD.

== Track listing ==
=== Side 1 ===
1. Decembernatt
2. Julens klockor (Bells of Christmas)
3. Tomten (till Inger)
4. Sjömansjul på Hawaii
5. Stilla natt (Stille Nacht, heilige Nacht)

=== Side 2 ===
1. Knalle Juls vals
2. Var é Tomten (I Believe in Santa)
3. När juldagsmorgon glimmar
4. Den fjärde vise mannen
5. Hoppets vind (Soleado)
6. Julestök (Outro)

== Contributors ==
- Hasse Andersson – vocals
- Ulf B. Edefuhr – steel guitar
- Sven-Åke (Blöffe) Lindeberg – electric guitar
- Hasse Rosén – guitar
- Håkan Nyberg – drums
- Nils (Nisse "bas") Persson – bass
- Caj Högberg – bass
- Roland Gottlow – keyboard
- Kjell Öhman – keyboard & accordion
- Lennart Sjöholm – keyboard
- Thomas Haglund – violin & mandolin

=== Others ===
- Lasse Westman, Lennart Sjöholm, Monica Svensson,
- Diana Nunez, Lotta Engberg and Liza Öhman – choir
- Producer & arrangement: Lennart Sjöholm

== Charts ==
Chart (1986–1987)	Peak position
Swedish Albums (Sverigetopplistan)	27
