= 40 år med Christer Sjögren =

Compilation album by Christer Sjögren
- Released: 26 March 2008
- Recorded: 1968–2008
- Genre: Christian songs, country, pop, rock
- Length: 2 hours, 12 minutes
- Label: NMG

Christer Sjögren chronology
| Älskade andliga sånger (2007) | 40 år med Christer Sjögren (2008) | Mitt sköna sextiotal (2008) |

40 år med Christer Sjögren is a compilation album by Christer Sjögren, released on 26 March 2008, during his 40th anniversary year as a recording artist. The album consists of recordings from his days as a solo artists, as well as with different bands.

== Track listing ==
1. I Love Europe
2. Kan man älska nå'n på avstånd (Vikingarna)
3. Nyanser (Vikingarna)
4. Crying in the Moonlight (Månsken i augusti)
5. Quando quando quando (Pelles)
6. Bossa Nova Baby
7. I dina kvarter (Vikingarna)
8. Till mitt eget Blue Hawaii (Vikingarna)
9. När du går över floden
10. Hallelujah (Vikingarna)
11. Livet går ej i repris (Vikingarna)
12. Adios adjö
13. Jag skall gå genom tysta skyar
14. Suspicious Minds
15. Glory Glory Hallelujah
16. Release Me (Vikingarna)
17. Drei rote Rosen (Die Vikinger)
18. Love Letters in the Sand (Vikingarna)
19. Somliga går med trasiga skor
20. Can You Feel the Love Tonight
21. Leende guldbruna ögon (Beautiful, Beautiful Brown Eyes, Vikingarna)
22. Burnin' Love
23. Vad gör än ett år (Vikingarna)
24. He's a Rocking Moviestar (Pelles)
25. Så skimrande var aldrig havet
26. Liljor (Vikingarna)
27. Den stora dagen (Vikingarna)
28. Tårar små tårar (Pelles)
29. In the Ghetto
30. Djingis Khan (Vikingarna)
31. Hallå Västindien (Vikingarna)
32. Tack och farväl (Vikingarna)
33. Guldgrävarsången
34. Ack Värmeland du sköna
35. Love Me Tender
36. Ljus och värme (Lys og varme, Vikingarna)
37. How Great thou art
38. För dina blåa ögons skull (Vikingarna)
39. Ol' Man River
40. Min vän (Jupiters)

== Charts ==
| Chart (2008) | Peak position |
|---|---|
| Norway (VG-lista) | 12 |
| Sweden (Sverigetopplistan) | 2 |
