= Kramgoa låtar 6 =

Studio album by Vikingarna
- Released: August 1978
- Genre: dansband music
- Length: circa 44 minutes
- Label: Mariann Records

Vikingarna chronology
| The Vikings Export (1978) | Kramgoa låtar 6 (1978) | Kramgoa låtar 7 (1979) |

Kramgoa låtar 6 is a 1978 Vikingarna studio album. It was also the band's final album with Stefan Borsch as its singer. The album was rereleased to cassette tape in 1979 and to CD in 1996.

== Track listing ==
=== Side 1 ===
1. Export
2. Marie, Marie
3. Låt inte din skugga falla här
4. Hey Paula
5. Singin' in the Rain
6. Kommer du till lunden
7. Om du går nu (It's a Heartache)

=== Side 2 ===
1. Du har gjort min gråa värld till guld igen (When My Blue Moon Turns to Gold Again)
2. En blyg liten tös
3. Det är ingen idé
4. Längtan efter dig
5. Hon får som hon vill (For a Few Dollars More)
6. Sail Along Silvery Moon
7. Corrine, Corrina
8. Godnattvalsen

== Charts ==
| Chart (1978) | Peak position |
|---|---|
| Norwegian Albums (VG-lista) | 17 |
| Swedish Albums (Sverigetopplistan) | 6 |
