= Carina Jaarnek =

Swedish singer

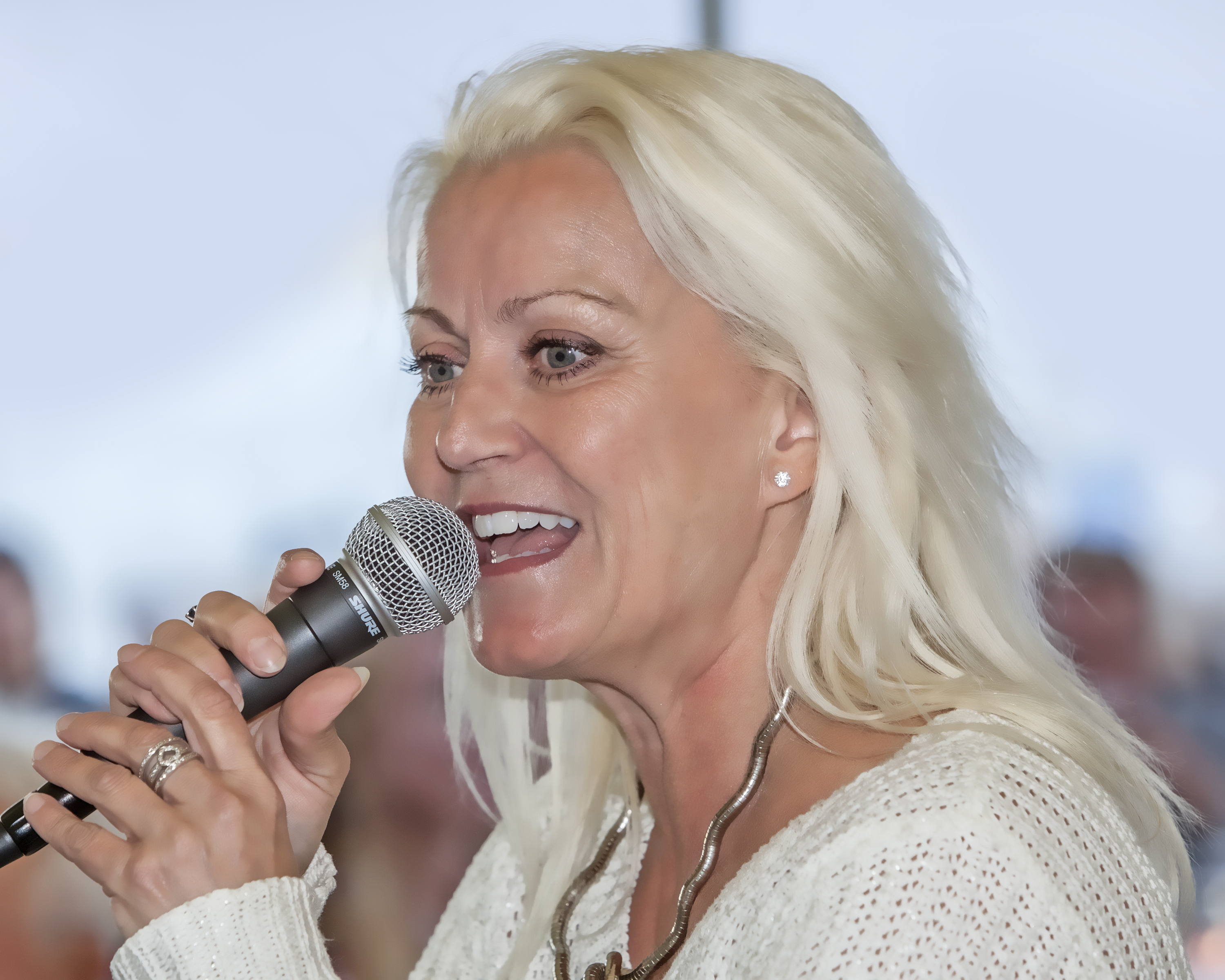
- Performing in Vaxholm in July 2013

Background information
- Born: 26 December 1962; Härnösand, Sweden
- Died: 17 January 2016 (aged 53); Stockholm, Sweden
- Genres: Pop, soul
- Occupation: Singer
- Formerly of: Carina Jaarneks orkester

Eva Carina Kvistborg Jaarnek (26 December 1962 – 17 January 2016) was a Swedish singer. During her career she performed in a number of dansbands, and she participated in Melodifestivalen twice.

== Career ==
During the 1970s, Jaarnek was part of the dansband Frösöflickorna, and during the 1980s in the dansbands Bosse Påhlssons orkester (orchestra) and Alfstarz. After this, she started her own band called Carina Jaarneks orkester. Jaarnek has been referred to as "The dansband queen of Sweden".

Jaarnek's first appearance on the Svensktoppen charts came in 1986 with the song "Natten tänder ljus på himlen". She performed the song "Det är aldrig försent" at Melodifestivalen 1994 with her younger brother Mikael Jaarnek, and she participated in Melodifestivalen 2002 with the song "Son of a Liar", which made it to the second chance round. Jaarnek placed third of fifteen countries in the Sopot International Song Festival in 1995 with the song "I want you back my love", the original Swedish title of which was "Då vaknar kärleken".

In Memphis, Tennessee, in 2005, Jaarnek recorded an album along with eight musicians who had worked with Elvis Presley: James Burton, Jerry Sheff, Glen Hardin, Ronnie Tutt, Charlie McCoy, BB Cunningham, Billy Swan, D. J. Fontana and Paul Burlison. The album won her a Guldklaven award. Jaarnek also recorded songs in Los Angeles in which guitarist Albert Lee participated.

Carina Jaarnek's sister Towe Jaarnek is also a singer.

Carina Jaarnek died on 17 January 2016 at the age of 53 after suffering a cerebral haemorrhage the evening before.

== Discography ==
=== Solo albums ===
- Se mig nu – 2000
- En hyllning till Elvis – 2005

=== Singles ===
- "Natten tänder ljus på himlen"/"Rör vid mig" ("Read My Lips") – 1986
- "Jazzbacillen"/"Rosen som du gav mig" – 1987
- "Kärlekens symfoni"/"Lite mer" – 1988
- "Casablanca"/"Si, si, si signore" – 1988
- "Man lär så länge man lever"/"Jag önskar att jag kunde flyga" – 1990
- "Familjelycka"/"Dröm är dröm och saga saga" ("Era bello il mio ragazzo") – 1991
- "Familjelycka"/"Dröm är dröm och saga saga" ("Era bello il mio ragazzo")/"Ta en chans"/"Sitter här i regnet" – 1991
- "Allt som en flicka vill ha"/"Då vaknar kärleken2 – 1993
- "Tänd ett ljus" – 1994
- "När julens tid är här igen"/"Julefrid" – 1996
- "När kärleken är ny" – 1996
- "Under alla dessa år" – 1997
- "Jag vill dela varje dag med dej" – 1998
- "Amore mio" – 2000
- "På väg (hem till dig)" – 2000
- "Minns du hur vi älskade" – 2000
- "Son of a Liar" – 2002
