= Schlagerminnen =

Studio album by Christer Sjögren
- Released: 30 September 2009
- Genre: Schlager
- Label: Mariann
- Producer: Lennart Sjöholm

Christer Sjögren chronology
Mitt sköna sextiotal (2008)	Schlagerminnen (2009)	En stjärna lyser i natt (2010)

Schlagerminnen is a 2009 studio album by Christer Sjögren, released on 30 September 2009, consisting of covers of 1950s and 1960s songs. It also includes the (at the time) 2009 newly written song "Ge oss år tillbaka", written by Marianne Karlsson from Kareby.

== Track listing ==
1. Ge oss år tillbaka
2. Du och jag (Help Yourself)
3. Rör min själ (You Raise Me Up)
4. Gröna små äpplen (Little Green Apples)
5. När jag ser tillbaka
6. Hej, du glada sommar (Tie a Yellow Ribbon Round the Ole Oak Tree)
7. Blad faller tyst som tårar (Leaves are the Tears of Autumn)
8. Vandra vidare
9. En röd blomma till en blond flicka (Red Roses For a Blue Lady)
10. Han måste gå (He'll Have To Go)
11. Din röst får en konstig klang (The Night Has a Thousand Eyes)
12. Balettdansös
13. Den sista valsen (The Last Waltz
14. Dansa en dans med mig (Ten Guitars)
15. Tusen och en natt (Strangers in the Night)

== Contributors ==
- Christer Sjögren - vocals
- Mårgan Höglund - drums
- Rutger Gunnarsson - bass
- Sebastian Nylund - guitar
- Peter Ljung - keyboard
- Lennart Sjöholm - producer

== Charts ==
Chart (2009–2010)	Peak position
Denmark (Tracklisten)	13
Norway (VG-lista)	13
Sweden (Sverigetopplistan)	5
