= Låt sommaren gunga dig =

1996 Carina Jaarneks orkester song

Song by Carina Jaarneks orkester

from the album Undr alla dessa år
- Language: Swedish
- Released: 1996
- Genre: dansband music
- Songwriter: Bert Månson

"Låt sommaren gunga dig" is a song written by Bert Månson, and recorded by Carina Jaarneks orkester, scoring a 1996 hit. The song charted at Svensktoppen for 11 weeks between 24 August-2 November 1996, peaking at third position.

Sanna Nielsen recorded the song in 1998 with lyrics in English, as "I Love the Summertime", and it was then released as a single.
