= Älskade andliga sånger =

Studio album by Christer Sjögren
- Released: 17 October 2007
- Recorded: Purple Sound Studio, Sveriges radio studio 3, Stockholm, Sweden, May–August 2007
- Genre: Christian songs
- Length: 53 minutes
- Label: NMG
- Producer: Lennart Sjöholm

Christer Sjögren chronology
King Creole (2006)	Älskade andliga sånger (2007)	40 år med Christer Sjögren (2008)

Älskade andliga sånger, released on 17 October 2007, is a Christer Sjögren studio album, consisting of Christian songs recorded together with Örebro gospel. Recorded in mid-2007, the album is based on songs performed by him inside church buildings and during tours.

== Track listing ==
1. Amazing Grace
2. Låt oss alla en gång mötas (Let's All Meet Once)
3. Still ro och nära
4. Just a Closer Walk with Thee
5. O store Gud (How Great Thou Art)
6. Bred dina vida vingar
7. He Ain't Heavy, He's My Brother
8. Han är min sång och glädje
9. Jag är främling
10. När du går över floden
11. Hallelujah
12. Någon ler
13. The Lord's Prayer
14. Räck mig din hand
15. I Believe
16. Ol' Man River

== Contributors ==
- Christer Sjögren – vocals
- Per Lindvall – drums, percussion
- Rutger Gunnarsson – bass
- Hasse Rosén – guitar
- Lasse Wellander – guitar
- Peter Ljung – keyboard
- Lennart Sjöholm – producer
- Örebro gospel – song

== Charts ==
Chart (2007–2008)	Peak position
Finland (The Official Finnish Chart)	27
Sweden (Sverigetopplistan)	2
