= Andliga sånger 2 =

Studio album by Christer Sjögren
- Released: October 1993
- Genre: Christian music
- Length: circa 41 minutes
- Label: NMG

Christer Sjögren chronology
Andliga sånger (1989)	Andliga sånger 2 (1993)	När ljusen ska tändas därhemma (1994)

Andliga sånger 2 is a 1993 studio album by Christer Sjögren, consisting of Christian songs.

== Track listing ==
1. Jag skall gå genom tysta skyar
2. Säg, känner du det underbara namnet
3. Blott en dag
4. Varför skola mänskor strida
5. Han visar vägen
6. His Hand in Mine
7. Låt oss alla en gång mötas
8. Härlighetens morgon
9. Som ett ljus
10. De kommer från öst och väst|De komma från öst och väst
11. Någonstans bland alla skuggorna står Jesus
12. In My Fathers House
13. Där rosor aldrig dör
14. Tänk att få vakna

== Contributors ==
- Klas Anderhell – drums
- Rutger Gunnarsson – bass
- Peter Ljung – keyboard
- Lasse Wellander – guitar

== Charts ==
Chart (1993–94)	Peak position
Sweden (Sverigetopplistan)	2
