= Varför är solen så röd? =

Studio album by Christer Sjögren
- Released: 21 October 1996
- Genre: schlager
- Label: NMG
- Producer: Ramón Arcusa

Christer Sjögren chronology
När ljusen ska tändas därhemma (1994)	Varför är solen så röd? (1996)	Ett julkort från förr (2000)

Varför är solen så röd? is a studio album by Christer Sjögren, released on 21 October 1996.

The album was recorded in Miami, and produced by Ramón Arcusa, also producer for Julio Iglesias. The album sold over 110,000 copies, and Christer Sjögren carried out a concert tour across Sweden and Norway, with songs from the album.

The song "Cecilia" charted at Svensktoppen for one week (14 December 1996). "Jag älskar dig än" received a Svensktoppen test on 22 February 1997. but failed to enter chart.

== Track listing ==
1. Varför är solen så röd (Quando calienta el sol)
2. Vi ska lära för livet (Quiereme mucho)
3. Quando, Quando, Quando
4. Jag älskar dig än
5. Ännu en dag (Johnny Guitar)
6. Crying in the Moonlight (Månsken i augusti)
7. Jag vill dansa med dig
8. San Martinho
9. Kärlekens vind (Lambada)
10. Vaya Con Dios
11. Cecilia
12. Jamaica (Jamaica: Jamaica Farewell)

== Contributors ==
- Dan Werner - guitar
- Nicky Orta - bass
- Tim Divine, keyboard
- Lee Levin - drums
- Tony Concepcion, trumpet

== Charts ==
Chart (1996–97)	Peak position
Norway (VG-lista)	11
Sweden (Sverigetopplistan)	3
