= Kramgoa låtar 7 =

Studio album by Vikingarna
- Released: May 1979
- Genre: dansband music
- Length: 37 minutes
- Label: Mariann Records

Vikingarna chronology
Kramgoa låtar 6 (1978)	Kramgoa låtar 7 (1979)	Vikingarnas julparty (1979)

Kramgoa låtar 7 is a 1979 Vikingarna studio album and the band's first album following Christer Sjögren replacing Stefan Borsch as the band's singer. The album was rereleased to CD in 1996.

== Track listing ==
=== Side 1 ===
1. Djinghis Khan (Dschinghis Khan) - 3.03
2. Hjärtats röst (Jealous Heart) - 2.23
3. Annie's Song (instrumental) - 3.14
4. Om du lämnar mig så här - 3.14
5. Så länge du älskar är du ung (500 Miles Away from Home) - 3.22
6. Jag kommer hem (I'm Coming Home) - 2.27
7. Jag var så kär - 2.55
8. Such a Night - 2.57

=== Side 2 ===
1. Hallelujah - 3.11
2. Veronica - 3.24
3. Playa Ingles - 3.20
4. Twilight Time - 3.16
5. Hooray Hooray (Hooray Hooray It's a Holi-Holiday) - 3.00
6. Tro på mej (Can't Help Falling in Love) - 2.42
7. Ge mig en sång - 3.16

== Charts ==
Chart (1979)	Peak position
Norwegian Albums (VG-lista)	14
