= En stjärna lyser i natt (album) =

Studio album by Christer Sjögren
- Released: November 17, 2010
- Recorded: Soundtrade Studios, Sveriges Radios studio 2, Park studio
- Genre: Christmas
- Length: 44 minutes
- Label: Warner Music Sweden
- Producer: Lennart Sjöholm

Christer Sjögren chronology
Schlagerminnen (2009)	En stjärna lyser i natt (2010)	Kramgoa låtar 2011 (2011)

En stjärna lyser i natt is a 2010 Christmas album by Christer Sjögren. The album release also saw Christer Sjögren on Christmas tour with Elisabeth Andreassen across Sweden and Norway.

== Track listing ==
#	Title	Writer
1.	"Stilla natt (Stille nacht, heilige nacht)"	Franz Gruber, Joseph Mohr
2.	"Ave Maria no morro"	Herivelto Martins, Ingela Forsman
3.	"Nu tändas tusen juleljus"	Emmy Köhler
4.	"Let It Snow! Let It Snow! Let It Snow!"	Sammy Cahn, Jule Styne
5.	"Gläns över sjö och strand"	Viktor Rydberg, Alice Tegnér
6.	"White Christmas"	Irving Berlin
7.	"O helga natt" ("Cantique de Noël")	Adolphe Adam, Augustin Kock
8.	"Julen är här" (with Elisabeth Andreassen)	Billy Butt, Sölve Rydell
9.	"Jul, jul, strålande jul"	Gustaf Nordqvist
10.	"Go Tell It on the Mountain"	trad.
11.	"Blue Christmas"	Billy Hayes, Jay W. Johnson
12.	"Bella Notte"	Sonny Burke, Peggy Lee, Gardar Sahlberg
13.	"En stjärna lyser i natt" ("En stjerne skinner i natt")	Tore W. Aas, Lasse Kronér
14.	"Happy Xmas (War Is Over)"	John Lennon, Yoko Ono

== Contributors ==
- Christer Sjögren - vocals
- Magnus Johansson - trumpet
- Mats Ronander - harmonica
- Mårgan Höglund - drums, percussion
- Thobias Gabrielsson - bass
- Sebastian Nylund - guitar
- Lennart Sjöholm - producer
- Immanuel gospelkör - vocals

== Charts ==
=== Weekly charts ===
Chart (2010–2011)	Peak position
Norwegian Albums (VG-lista)	36
Swedish Albums (Sverigetopplistan)	5

=== Year-end charts ===
Chart (2010)	Position
Swedish Albums (Sverigetopplistan)	40

== Certifications ==
Region	Certification	Certified units/sales
Sweden (GLF)	Gold	20,000^{‡}
^{‡} Sales+streaming figures based on certification alone.
