= För kärlekens skull (album) =

Studio album by Christer Sjögren
- Released: October 15, 2003
- Recorded: Atlantis Studio and Polar Studio, Stockholm, Sweden
- Label: NMG

Christer Sjögren chronology
Ett julkort från förr (2000)	För kärlekens skull (2003)	Love Me Tender (2005)

För kärlekens skull is a 2003 Christer Sjögren studio album.

== Track listing ==
1. För kärlekens skull
2. Jag ger dig min morgon (I Give You the Morning)
3. Jag älskar bara mer
4. Kärleken förde oss samman
5. När morgonen gryr
6. Så skimrande var aldrig havet
7. Morgon på Kungsholmen
8. Älska mig
9. Somliga går med trasiga skor
10. En valsmelodi
11. Den första gång jag såg dig
12. Kärleksvals
13. I folkviseton
14. Ack Värmeland du sköna

== Contributors ==
- Christer Sjögren - vocals
- Per Lindvall - drums
- Peter Ljung - piano, keyboard
- Thobias Gabrielsson - bass
- Henrik Janson, Ulf Janson - guitar, keyboard

== Charts ==
Chart (2003–2004)	Peak position
Norway (VG-lista)	25
Sweden (Sverigetopplistan)	4
