= Andliga sånger =

Studio album by Christer Sjögren
- Released: November 1989
- Recorded: September–October 1989
- Genre: Christian
- Label: NMG
- Producer: Lars O. Carlsson

Christer Sjögren chronology
| Andliga sånger (1989) | Andliga sånger 2 (1993) |

Andliga sånger is the debut studio album by Swedish singer Christer Sjögren.

== Track listing ==
1. Pärleporten
2. Crying in the Chapel
3. Barnatro
4. Han är min sång och min glädje (There Goes My Everything)
5. Gyllne morgon
6. Jag har hört om en stad
7. Räck mig din hand
8. När du går över floden
9. Guldgrävarsången
10. O store Gud
11. Ovan där (We Will Understand it Better by and by)
12. Var jag går i skogar, berg och dalar
13. O sällhet stor

== Personnel ==
- Christer Sjögren – lead vocals

== Charts ==
| Chart (1989–1990) | Peak position |
|---|---|
| Sweden (Sverigetopplistan) | 8 |
