= Mitt sköna sextiotal =

Studio album by Christer Sjögren
- Released: 17 September 2008 (Sweden); 24 April 2009 (Germany)
- Studio: Purple Sound Studio and Sveriges radio studio 2, Stockholm, Sweden and NSL-studio, Skara, Sweden
- Genre: country, pop, rock
- Length: 46 minutes
- Label: Warner Music Sweden
- Producer: Lennart Sjöholm

Christer Sjögren chronology
40 år med Christer Sjögren (2008)	Mitt sköna sextiotal (2008)	Schlagerminnen (2009)

Mitt sköna sextiotal is a Christer Sjögren studio album, released in Sweden on 17 September 2008 and on 24 April 2009 in Germany.

While being a tribute album to 1960s popular music, it also consists of the 2008 Christer Sjögren song "I Love Europe" and a recording of "If Tomorrow Never Comes", a 1989 Garth Brooks song.

== Track listing ==
1. Everybody Loves Somebody
2. If Tomorrow Never Comes
3. Save the Last Dance for Me (duet with Jessica Andersson)
4. I Love You Because
5. That's Life
6. Young Girl
7. Early Mornin' Rain
8. Crazy
9. What Do You Want to Make Those Eyes at Me For
10. Ramlin' Rose
11. Green Green Grass of Home
12. Help Me Make It Through the Night
13. Only You
14. What a Wonderful World
15. I Love Europe (bonus track)

== Contributors ==
- Christer Sjögren - song
- Lasse Wellander - guitar
- Hasse Rosén - guitar
- Thobias Gabrielsson - bass
- Bosse Persson - bass
- Peter Ljung - keyboard
- Per Lindvall - drums
- Lasse Persson - drums
- Pablo Cepeda - percussion
- Janne Lindgren - steelguitar
- Wojtek Goral - saxophone
- Lennart Sjöholm - producer, accordion

== Charts ==
Chart (2008)	Peak position
Denmark (Tracklisten)	9
Norway (VG-lista)	21
Sweden (Sverigetopplistan)	2
