= Scandic Talk Hotel =

Skyscraper in Stockholm Municipality, Sweden

Coordinates: 59.2769°N 18.0156°E

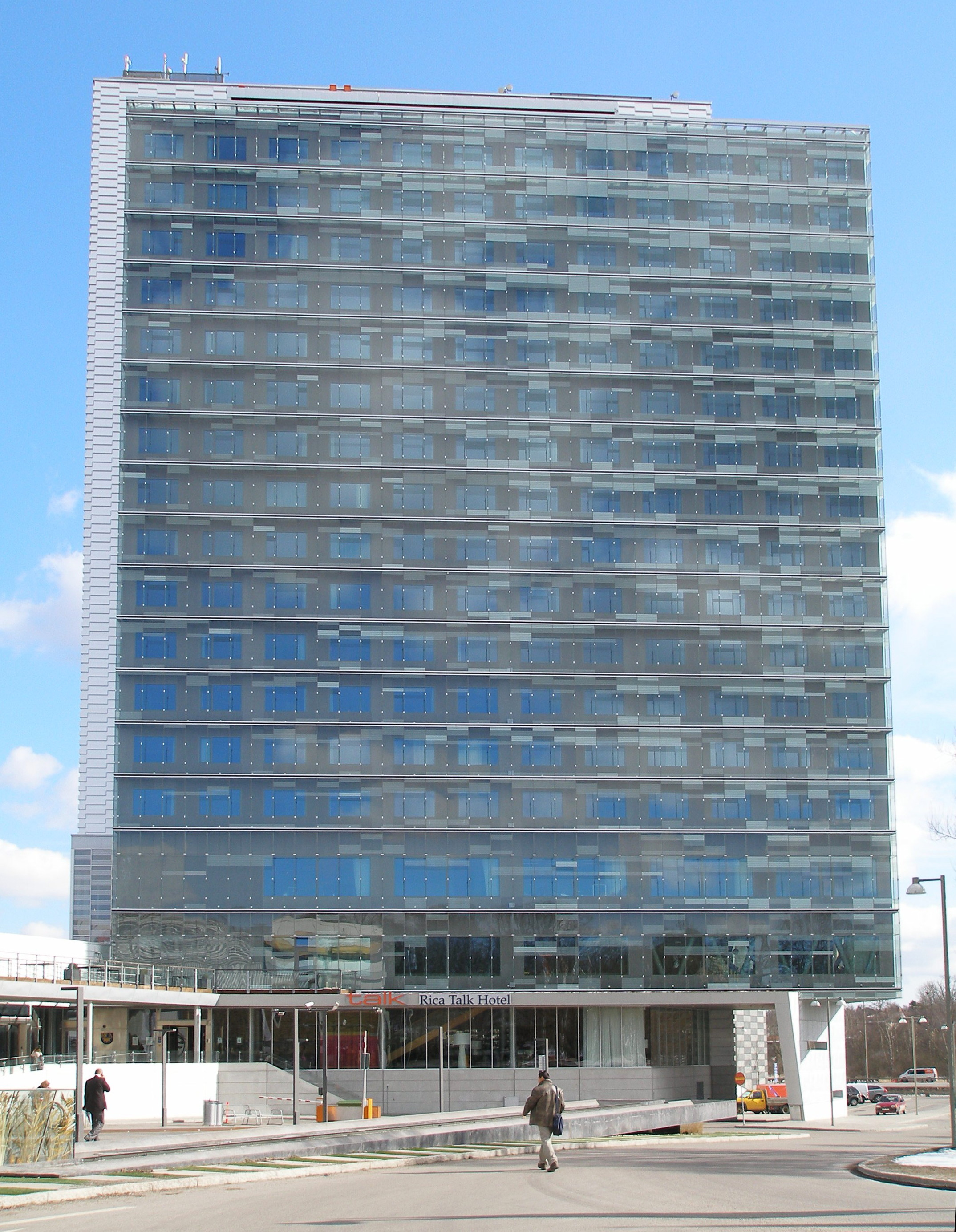

Scandic Talk Hotel (previously the Rica Talk Hotel) is a skyscraper and hotel, located at the Stockholm International Fairs in Älvsjö, Stockholm Municipality, Sweden. It is 72 m tall and includes 19 floors and 248 rooms. Scandic acquired the hotel in 2014 when it purchased Rica Hotels.

The building was constructed by Rosenbergs Arkitekter and it opened on 23 May 2006.
