= Love Me Tender (Christer Sjögren album) =

Studio album by Christer Sjögren
- Released: 23 February 2005
- Recorded: Purple Sound Studio Stockholm, Sweden, September–December 2004
- Genre: country, pop, rock
- Length: 50 minutes
- Label: NMG
- Producer: Lennart Sjöholm

Christer Sjögren chronology
För kärlekens skull (2003)	Love Me Tender (2005)	King Creole (2008)

Love Me Tender is a Christer Sjögren album, released 15 February 2005, consisting of recordings of songs who had earlier been recorded by Elvis Presley.

== Track listing ==
1. Love Me Tender
2. Don't Be Cruel
3. One Night with You
4. Always on My Mind
5. Good Luck Charm
6. Can't Help Falling in Love
7. Surrender
8. You Don't Have to Say You Love Me
9. In the Ghetto
10. The Wonder of You
11. Return to Sender
12. Young and Beautiful
13. Are You Lonesome Tonight?
14. She's Not You
15. Crying in the Chapel
16. Devil in Disguise
17. I Want You, I Need You, I Love You
18. Suspicious Minds

== Contributors ==
- Christer Sjögren - vocals
- Lennart Sjöholm - producer
- Per Lindwall - drums
- Rutger Gunnarsson - bass
- Lasse Wellander - guitar
- Peter Ljung - piano, keyboard

== Charts ==
=== Weekly charts ===
Chart (2005)	Peak position
Danish Albums (Hitlisten)	4
Norwegian Albums (VG-lista)	16
Swedish Albums (Sverigetopplistan)	1

=== Year-end charts ===
Chart (2005)	Position
Swedish Albums (Sverigetopplistan)	21

== Certifications ==
Region	Certification	Certified units/sales
Sweden (GLF)	Platinum	60,000^{^}
^{^} Shipments figures based on certification alone.
