= I Love Europe =

Single by Christer Sjögren

from the album Mitt sköna sextiotal
- A-side: "I Love Europe" (radio edit)
- B-side: "I Love Europe" (singback version)
- Released: 12 March 2008
- Genre: schlager
- Label: M&L
- Songwriter(s): Magnus Johansson, Torgny Söderberg

I Love Europe is a song written by Torgny Söderberg and Magnus Johansson, with lyrics by Ingela Forsman. It was originally performed by Christer Sjögren at Melodifestivalen 2008. On 9 February 2008, the song headed directly from the semifinal inside Scandinavium in Gothenburg to the final in the Stockholm Globe Arena on 15 March that year. Once there, the song ended up 9th. Magnus Johansson also appeared on stage as a trumpeter.

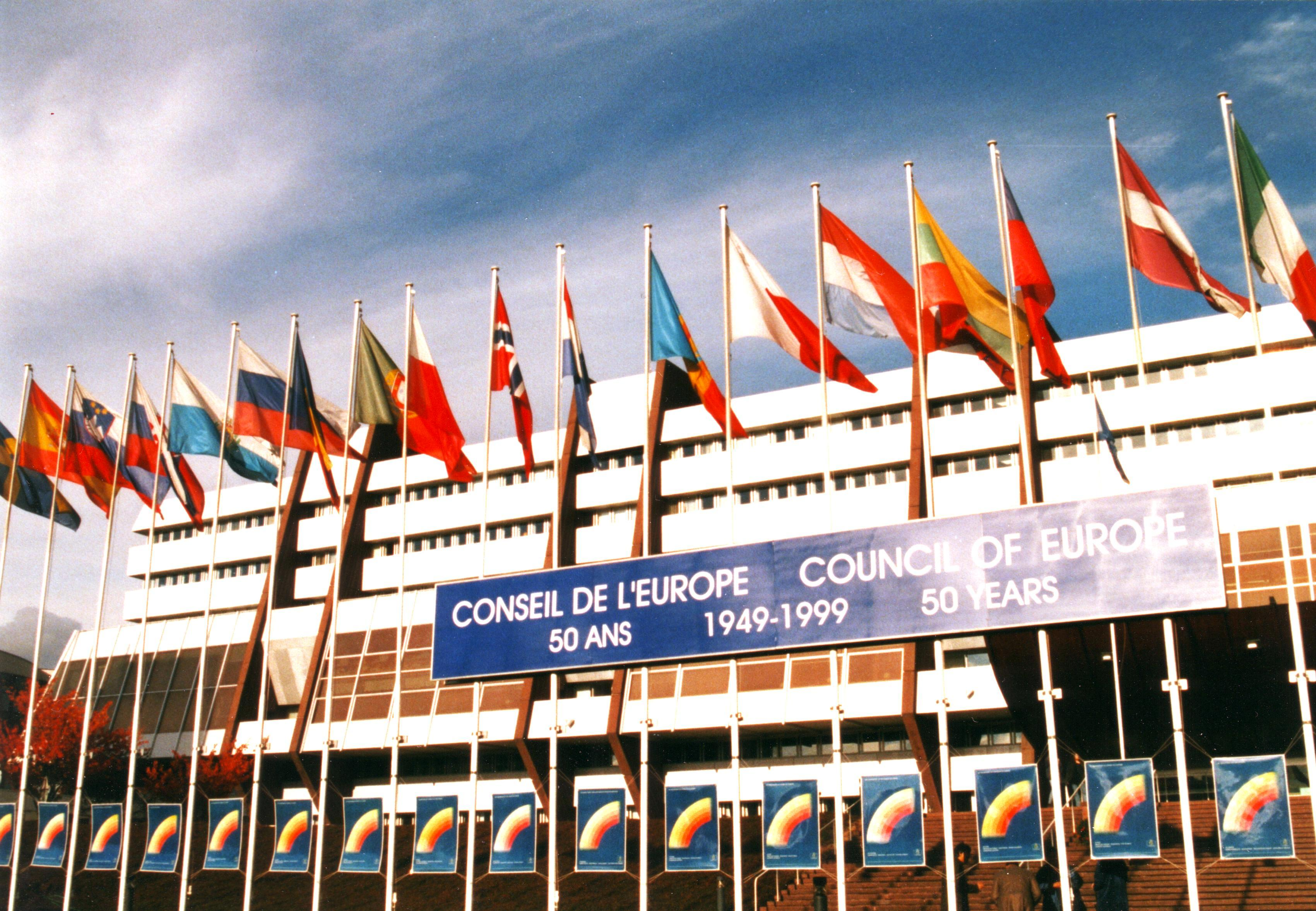
Song lyrics describes all nations of Europe as one big family.

The song lyrics describe the dream of friendship and peace all across Europe, and compares the nations with one big family.

The single was released on 12 March 2008, and it peaked at 15th position at the Swedish singles chart. The song also charted at Svensktoppen for 18 weeks between 6 April–3 August 2008, peaking at 5th position. The song also appeared as a bonus track on Christer Sjögren's studio album Mitt sköna sextiotal, released in September the same year.

The song was also brought attention by radio station Rix FM, where program host Gert Fylking launched a Rix Morronzoo campaign called Christer till Belgrad ("Christer for Belgrade"), to get people voting for the song.

At Dansbandskampen 2008 the song was performed by Larz-Kristerz, turning the song into accordion-based. The band also recorded the song for the album Hem till dig, released in February 2009.

Swedish radio program Framåt fredag did a parody called I Europa.

== Single track listing ==
1. I Love Europe (radio edit)
2. I Love Europe (singback version)

== Chart position ==
Chart (2008)	Peak position
Sweden (Sverigetopplistan)	15

== Contributing musicians ==
- Christer Sjögren – lead vocals
- Torgny Söderberg- keyboards, songwriters, producer
- Magnus Johansson - trumpet, keyboards, songwriter, producer
- Per Lindvall - drums
- Lasse Wellander - guitar
- Mats Johansson - guitar
- Ingela "Pling" Forsman - song lyrics
