= Carina Jaarneks orkester =

Swedish dansband

- Origin: Ronneby, Sverige
- Genres: dansband
- Years active: 1989-early 2000s

Carina Jaarneks orkester was a dansband in the town of Ronneby, Sweden, scoring chart successes at Svensktoppen between the late 1980s and the early 2000s, with Carina Jaarnek acting as the band's singer. It was started in 1989. In 1991, the band won the first, unofficial, edition of the Swedish Dansband Championships contest. In the year 2000, the band participated in the finals of the Dansbandslåten contest with the song Minns du hur vi älskade which, however, didn't win the contest.

== Discography ==
=== Albums ===
- Carina Jaarneks orkester (album) – 1989
- Hela livet leker – 1994
- Under alla dessa år – 1998
- Carina Jaarneks live -99 – 1999
- Live Collection – 1999

=== Singles ===
- Man lär så länge man lever/Jag önskar att jag kunde flyga – 1990
- När hela livet leker/Sitter här i regnet – 1994
- Ännu en dag – 1998
- Du är det bästa för mig – 1999
- En liten fågel – 1999

== Svensktoppen songs ==
- Låt sommaren gunga dig – 1996
- Under alla dessa år – 1999
- Du är det bästa för mig – 1999
- På väg (hem till dig) – 2000
- Minns du hur vi älskade – 2000

=== Failed to enter chart ===
- När kärleken är ny – 1997
- Mina ljusa barndomsminnen – 1998
- Jag vill dela varje dag med dig – 1999
- Ännu en dag – 1999
- Amore mio – 2000
