= När juldagsmorgon glimmar =

Swedish Christmas song

"När juldagsmorgon glimmar" (Swedish for "When Christmas morning glimmers") is a Swedish Christmas song. Betty Ehrenborg-Posse wrote the text in 1851 to the tune of the German student song from 1819, "Wir hatten gebauet ein stattliches Haus".

== Christmas lyrics ==
The Swedish adaptation is often sung in homes, in schools and sometimes in Saint Lucia's Day processions. It was originally used by the Swedish free church movement. The lyrics includes childhood references that were removed when the song was included in the hymnal Den svenska psalmboken (1986), and replaced with an adapted version of the lyrics that was originally published in 1906 in the song book Sjung svenska folk!. Who made this adaptation is unknown.

The song has been recorded by Agnetha Fältskog on her 1981 Christmas album Nu tändas tusen juleljus, by Hasse Andersson on Jul i Kvinnaböske from 1986, and by Kikki Danielsson on Min barndoms jular from 1987.

== Publication ==
- Andelig Örtagård för Barn, 1851, published in Jönköping.
- Andeliga Sånger för barn, volume 2, 1856 (collection by Betty Ehrenborg-Posse).
- Stockholms söndagsskolförenings sångbok, 1882, as number 14 witrh three verses, under the title "Julsånger".
- Herde-Rösten, 1892, as number 434 under the title "Jul-sånger".
- Barnens sångbok, 1893, as number 25 under the title "Julsång".
- Sjung, svenska folk!, 1906, same verses 2 and 3 as in Den svenska psalmboken (1986), both verses writer unknown (1999)
- Svensk söndagsskolsångbok, 1908, as number 21 under the title "Julsånger".
- Lilla Psalmisten, 1909 as number 20 under the title "Kristus: Hans födelse, död och uppståndelse".
- Svenska Frälsningsarméns sångbok, 1922, as number 27 under the title "Högtider, Jul".
- Kyrklig sång, 1916–1927 as number 75.
- Svensk söndagsskolsångbok, 1929, as number 41 under the title "Advents- och julsånger".
- Frälsningsarméns sångbok, 1929, as number 540 under the title "Högtider och särskilda tillfällen – Jul".
- Musik till Frälsningsarméns sångbok, 1930, as number 540.
- Segertoner, 1930, as number 435 under the title "Jesu människoblivande. Julsånger".
- Sionstoner, 1935, as number 161 under the title "Jul".
- Guds lov, 1935, as number 39 under the title "Advents- och julsånger".
- Nu ska vi sjunga, 1943, under the title "Julsånger", listed as "tysk folkmelodi" [German folk melody]
- Sions Sånger, 1951, as number 144.
- Förbundstoner, 1957, as number 42 under the title "Guds uppenbarelse i Kristus: Jesu födelse".
- Kyrkovisor, 1960, as number 718 under the title "Jul".
- Frälsningsarméns sångbok, 1968, as number 597 under the title "Högtider – Jul".
- Sions Sånger, 1981, as number 7 under the title "Jul".
- Den svenska psalmboken, 1986, as number 121 under the title "Jul".
- Lova Herren, 1987, as number 102 under the title "Jul".
- Sionsharpan, 1993, as number 9 under the title "Jul".
- Julens önskesångbok, 1997, under the title "Traditionella julsånger", credited as "German folk tune".
- Barnens svenska sångbok, 1999, under the title "Året runt".
- Sions sånger, 2008, as nummer 12 under the title "Jul".
