= Sjömansjul på Hawaii =

Single by Yngve Stoor
- A-side: "Sjömansjul på Hawaii"
- B-side: "Good Bye, Good Bye, mitt blå Hawaii"
- Released: November 1945
- Recorded: Stockholm, Sweden, 20 September 1945
- Genre: schlager
- Label: Sonora
- Songwriters: Helge Roundquist, Yngve Stoor

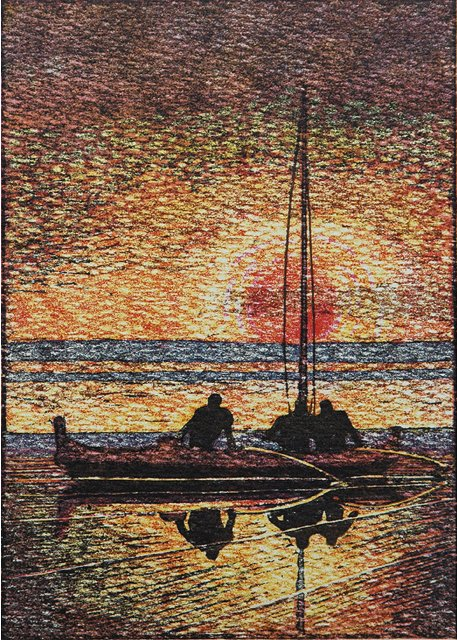
Hawaii at Christmastime

Sjömansjul på Hawaii, also known as "Jag en ensam sjöman är" or "Det är julkväll på Hawaii", is a Christmas song, with lyrics by Helge Roundquist (signature "Miguel Torres") and music by Yngve Stoor. The lyrics describe a Swedish sailor visiting Hawaii at Christmastime, and longs back home to Sweden when the sailors celebrate Christmas on board their boat, moored to a wharf while the Sunshine.

The song was recorded by Yngve Stoor and became one of the most popular Swedish songs of 1945, despite being seasonal.

== Other recordings ==
- Sven-Ingvars (1965)
- Trio Me' Bumba (1973)
- Lalla Hansson (1979)
- Hasse Andersson (1986)
- Lars Vegas trio (1992)
- Christer Sjögren (1994)
- Gösta Linderholm & the Trad Brothers (1994, failed Svensktoppen on 14 December 2002)
- Black-Ingvars (1995)
