= Alfstarz =

- Origin: Ronneby, Sweden
- Genres: dansband
- Years active: late 1980s-early 1990s

The Alfstarz was a dansband in the town of Ronneby, Sweden.

== Discography ==
=== Singles ===
- Jag är på väg/Vem - 1988
- Barfota i regn/Amors pilar (Little Arrows) - 1989
- San Martinique/Ge inte upp - 1989
- Bang en boomerang/Tack för ni kom (Dein Herz wird mich versteh'n) - 1991

== Svensktoppen songs ==
- Natten tänder ljus på himlen - 1986-1987
