= King Creole (Christer Sjögren album) =

Studio album by Christer Sjögren
- Released: 15 February 2006
- Recorded: Purple Sound Studio Stockholm, Sweden, November–December, 2005
- Genre: Country, pop, rock
- Length: 49 minutes
- Label: EMI Music Sweden
- Producer: Lennart Sjöholm

Christer Sjögren chronology
Love Me Tender (2005)	King Creole (2006)	Älskade andliga sånger (2007)

King Creole is an album by Christer Sjögren, released 15 February 2006. The albums consists of recordings of songs previously recorded by Elvis Presley.

== Track listing ==
1. King Creole
2. Burning Love
3. Love Me
4. You'll Never Walk Alone
5. I Need Your Love Tonight
6. Blue Suede Shoes
7. Kiss Me Quick
8. There Goes My Everything
9. You Gave Me a Mountain
10. Bossa Nova Baby
11. Don't
12. Stuck on You
13. Teddy Bear
14. Let it Be Me
15. Hound Dog
16. Hurt
17. I'll Remember You
18. How Great Thou Art

== Contributors ==
- Christer Sjögren - vocals
- Per Lindvall - drums, percussion
- Rutger Gunnarsson - bass
- Peter Ljung - piano, keyboard
- LÖasse Wellander - guitar
- Sebastian Nylund - guitar
- Leif Lindwall - trumpet
- Lennart Sjöholm - producer
- Svea Strings

== Charts ==
Chart (2006–2007)	Peak position
Denmark (Tracklisten)	27
Norway (VG-lista)	39
Sweden (Sverigetopplistan)	3
