= Stockholm International Fairs =

Exhibition venue in Stockholm, Sweden

Stockholmsmässan
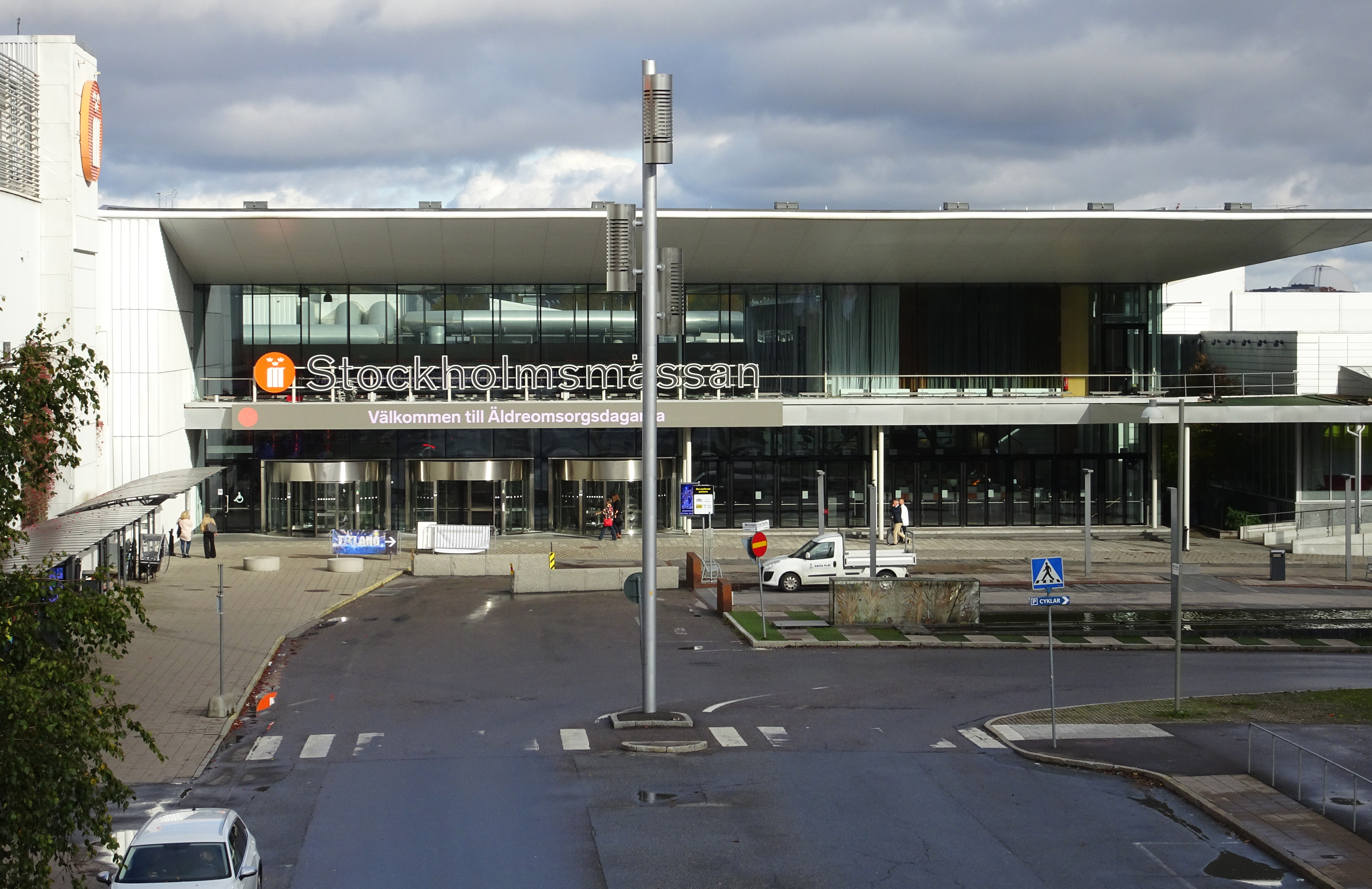
- Interactive map of Stockholmsmässan
- Location: Älvsjö, Stockholm, Sweden
- Coordinates: 59.277778°N 18.015278°E
- Owner: Stockholm Municipality; Stockholm Chamber of Commerce
- Public transit: Älvsjö railway station

Construction
- Built: 12 November 1966 to 1971
- Opened: 20 March 1971
- Renovated: Several times since 1992
- Expanded: Several times since 1977
- Architect: ELLT (1970)

Website
- www.stockholmsmassan.se

Stockholm Exhibition & Congress Centre (Swedish: Stockholmsmässan) is a large exhibition facility that arranges trade fairs in Stockholm, Sweden.

== History ==
The idea of starting a trade fair in Stockholm started with brothers Börje and Folke Claeson in 1942.

Initially, the Royal Tennis Hall (Kungliga tennishallen) was rented for this purpose. In 1964, the City of Stockholm and Stockholm Chamber of Commerce took over as owners and operators. The main building was constructed in 1971 in the Älvsjö suburb of Stockholm Municipality.

== Events ==
The facility has hosted international congresses, seminars, general assemblies and musical events. It played host to the 1975 Eurovision Song Contest and Melodifestivalen, the Swedish national selection, in Melodifestivalen 1996 and 1999.

== Gallery ==
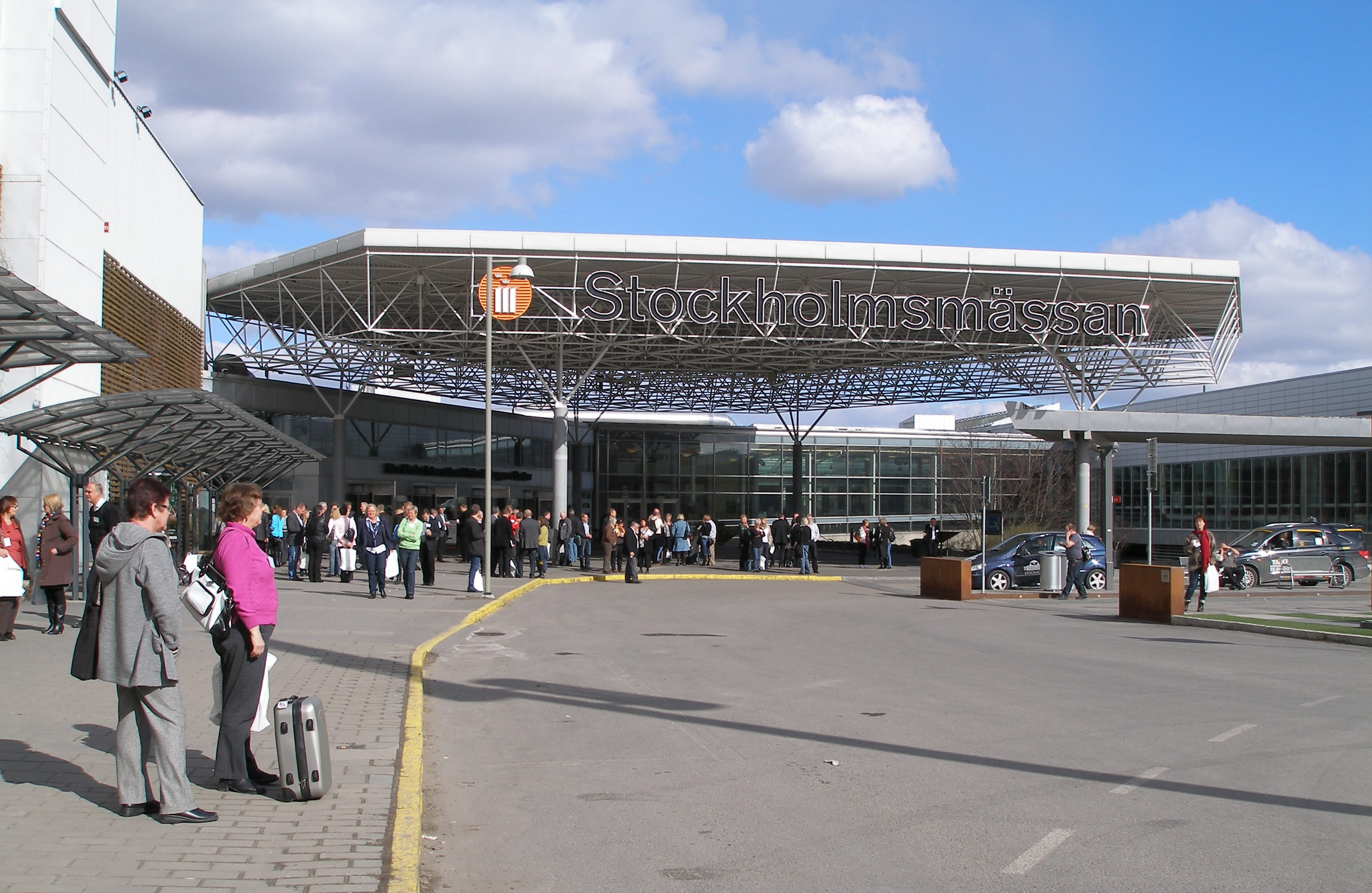
Main entrance before renovation (March 2009)

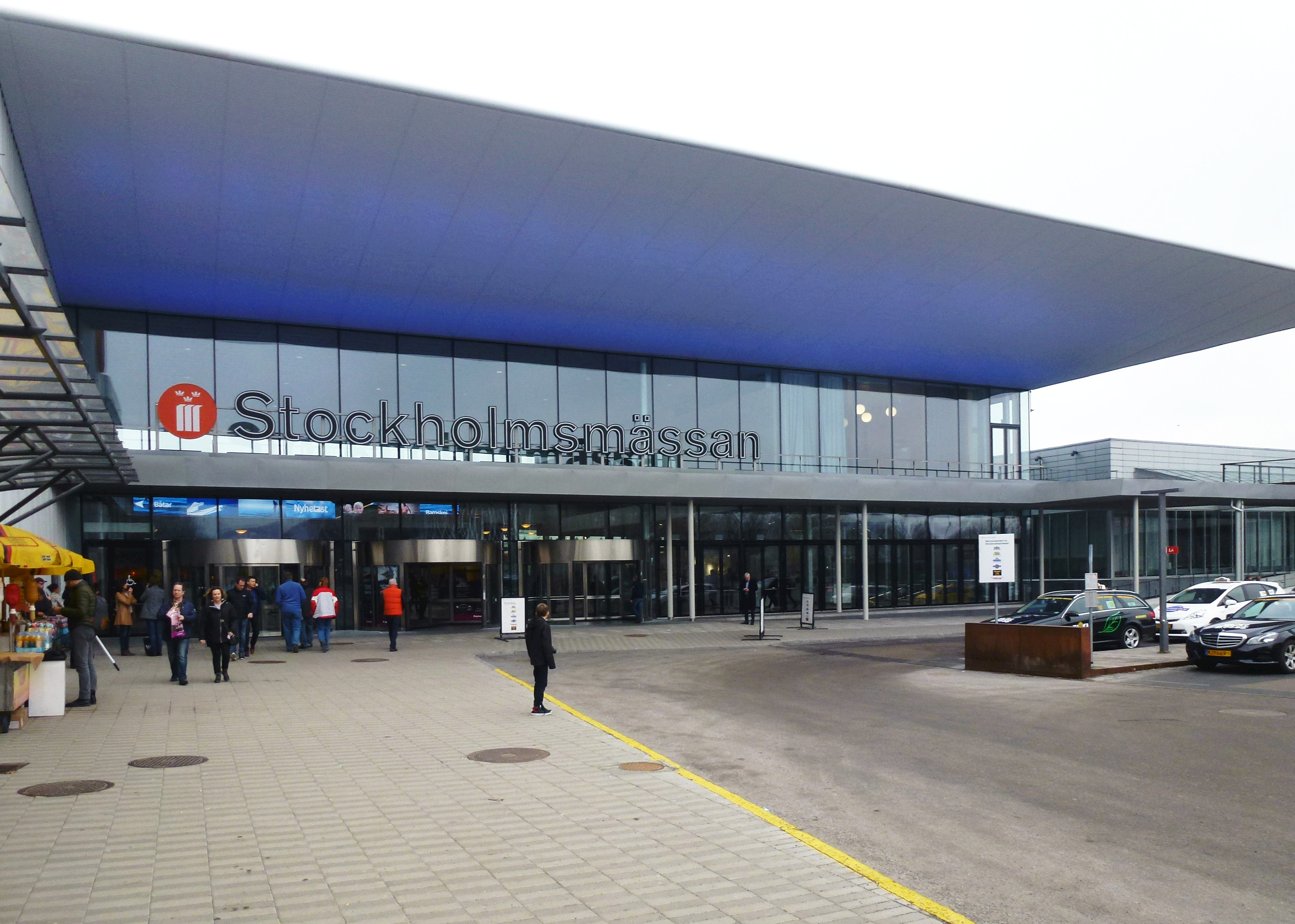
Main entrance (February 2015)

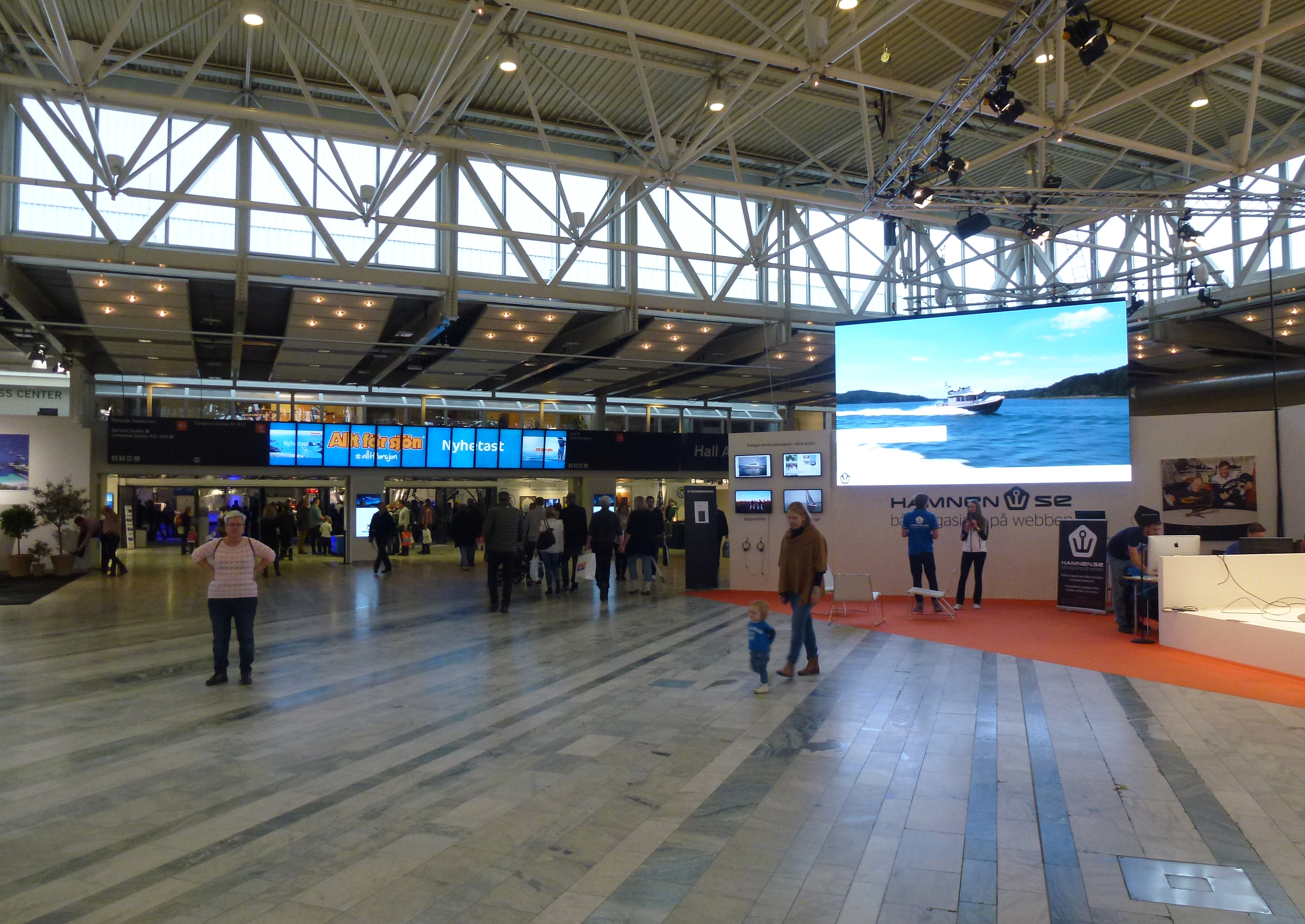
New entrance to halls (February 2015)

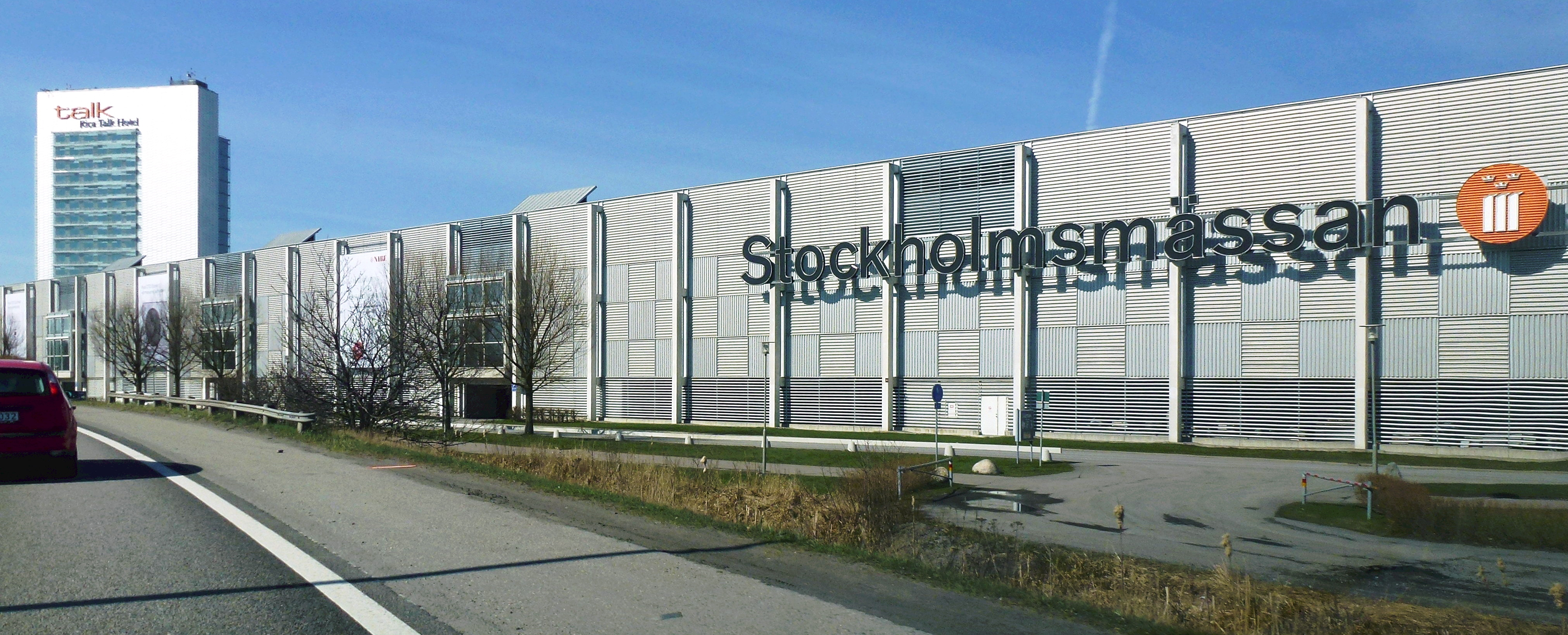
Scandic Talk Hotel (far left) is located within the complex

Preceded by The Dome; Brighton	Eurovision Song Contest; Venue; 1975	Succeeded by Congresgebouw; The Hague
