= Lotta & Christer =

Studio album by Lotta Engberg & Christer Sjögren
- Released: 12 April 2012
- Recorded: Studio Gallskrik; Bohus Sound Studios; Park Studio
- Genre: schlager
- Length: 37:50
- Label: Mariann Grammofon

Lotta & Christer is a Lotta Engberg & Christer Sjögren studio album. It was released in 2012.

== Track listing ==
#	Title	Songwriter	Length
1.	"Don't Let Me Down" (duet)	Lars Diedricson, Lasse Holm	2:55
2.	"Utekväll" (Lotta)	Henrik Sethson, Stefan Brunzell	2:57
3.	"Ett strävsamt gammalt par" (Christer Sjögren)	Sonja Aldén	3:36
4.	"They Can't Take That Away from Me" (duet)	George Gershwin, Ira Gershwin	3:22
5.	"Tro på mig" (Christer)	Torgny Söderberg, Monica Forsberg	3:17
6.	"You're My World" (Lotta)	Umberto Bindi, Gino Paoli	2:43
7.	"In Dreams" (Christer)	Roy Orbison	3:24
8.	"Nånting fånigt" ("Somethin' Stupid")	C. Carson Parks, Bo-Göran Edling	2:36
9.	"Världens lyckligaste tjej" (Lotta)	Peter Grundström	3:23
10.	"It's Only Make Believe" (Christer)	Conway Twitty, Jack Nance	2:26
11.	"Beautiful Day" (Lotta)	J. Hansen, L.E. Carlsson	3:03
12.	"When I Fall in Love" (duet)	Edward Heyman, Victor Young	4:06

== Contributors ==
- Leif Ottebrand, Patrik Ehlersson – arrangement, production (track 2, 4, 6, 8, 9, 11)
- Lennart Sjöholm (track 3, 5, 7, 10, 12), Lars Diedricson (1) – arrangement, production
- Torgny Söderberg – co-arrangement ("Tro på mig")
- Anders Engberg – wind-arrangement ("Utekväll")
- Martin Lindqvist – saxophone-arrangement ("Världens lyckligaste tjej")
- Johan Franzon, Mårgan Höglund, Bengan Andersson – drums
- Michael Engström, Tobias Gabrielsson, Thomas Lindberg – bass
- Leif Ottebrand, Peter Ljung, Lennart Sjöholm, Curt-Eric Holmquist, Anders Lundquist, Lars Diedricson – keyboard
- Mats Johansson, Lasse Wellander, Mats Jenséus, Patrik Ehlersson, Per Strandberg, Johan Randén – guitar
- Magnus Johansson – trumpet
- Peter Johansson – trombone
- Tomas Jansson, Wojtek Goral, Martin Lindqvist – woodwind
- Pierre Eriksson – accordion
- Dieter Schöning, Viveca Rydén Mårtensson, Mats Wulfson – strings
- Lotta Engberg, Anneli Axelsson, Erik Mjönes, Per Strandberg, Malin Engberg, Lennart Sjöholm, Carl Utbult, Jaana Vähämäki, Peter Larsson – background singing
- Recording – Studio Gallskrik, Bohus Sound Studios, Park Studio
- Patrik Ehlersson, Leif Ottebrand – engineer
- Tobias Lindell, Bohus Stound Studio – mixing
- Bernard Löhr, Mono Music Studio – mixing ("Don't Let Me Down")
- Dragan Tanasković, Bohus Stound Studio – mixing
- Peter Knutsson – photo
- Helene Norberg – hair and makeup
- Anders Bühlund, Forma – design

== Charts ==
Chart (2012)	Peak position
Norway (VG-lista)	35
Sweden (Sverigetopplistan)	2
