= Älvsjö =

Urban district in Stockholm, Sweden

Coordinates: 59°16′30″N 18°00′15″E

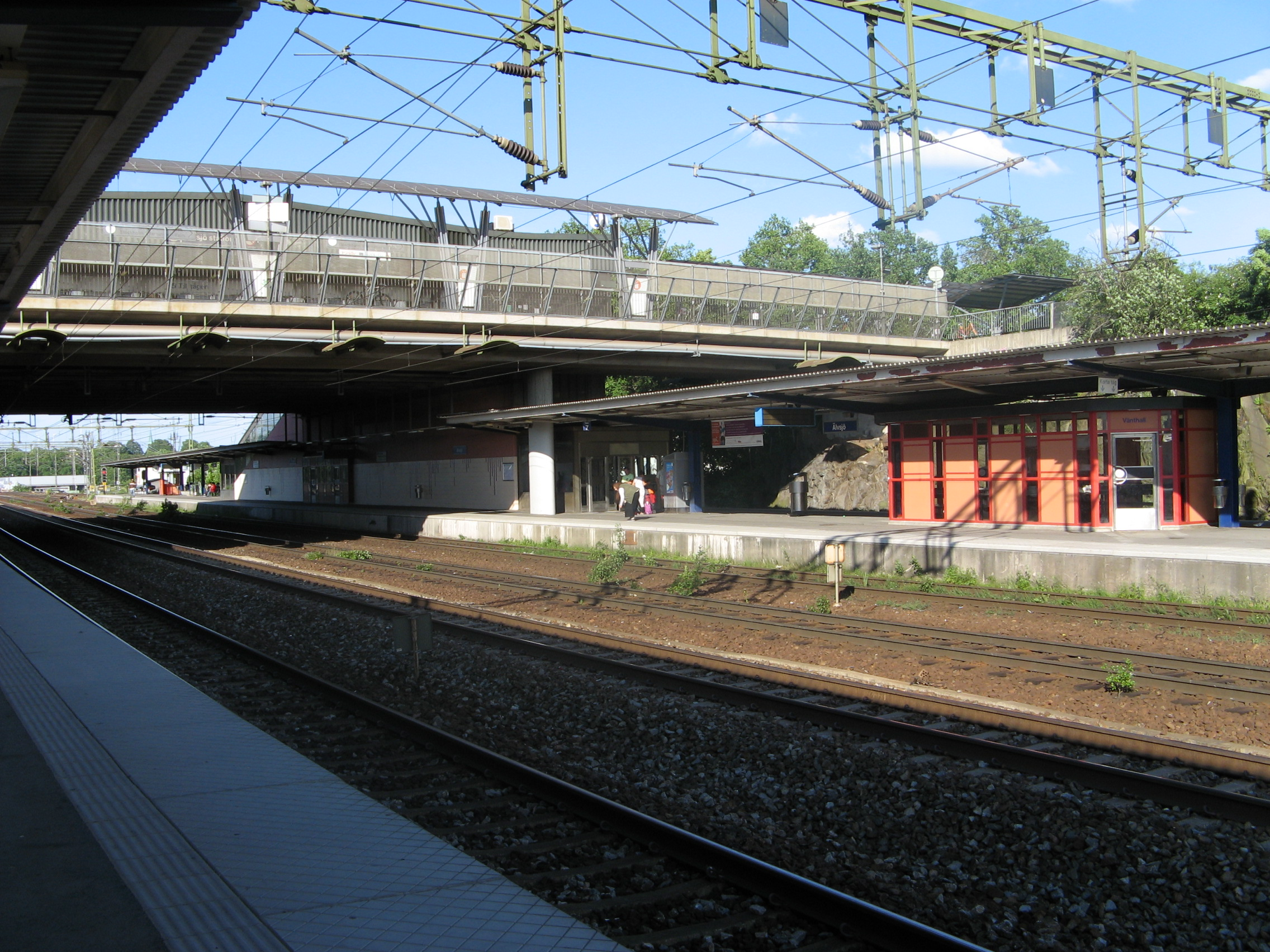
Älvsjö train station

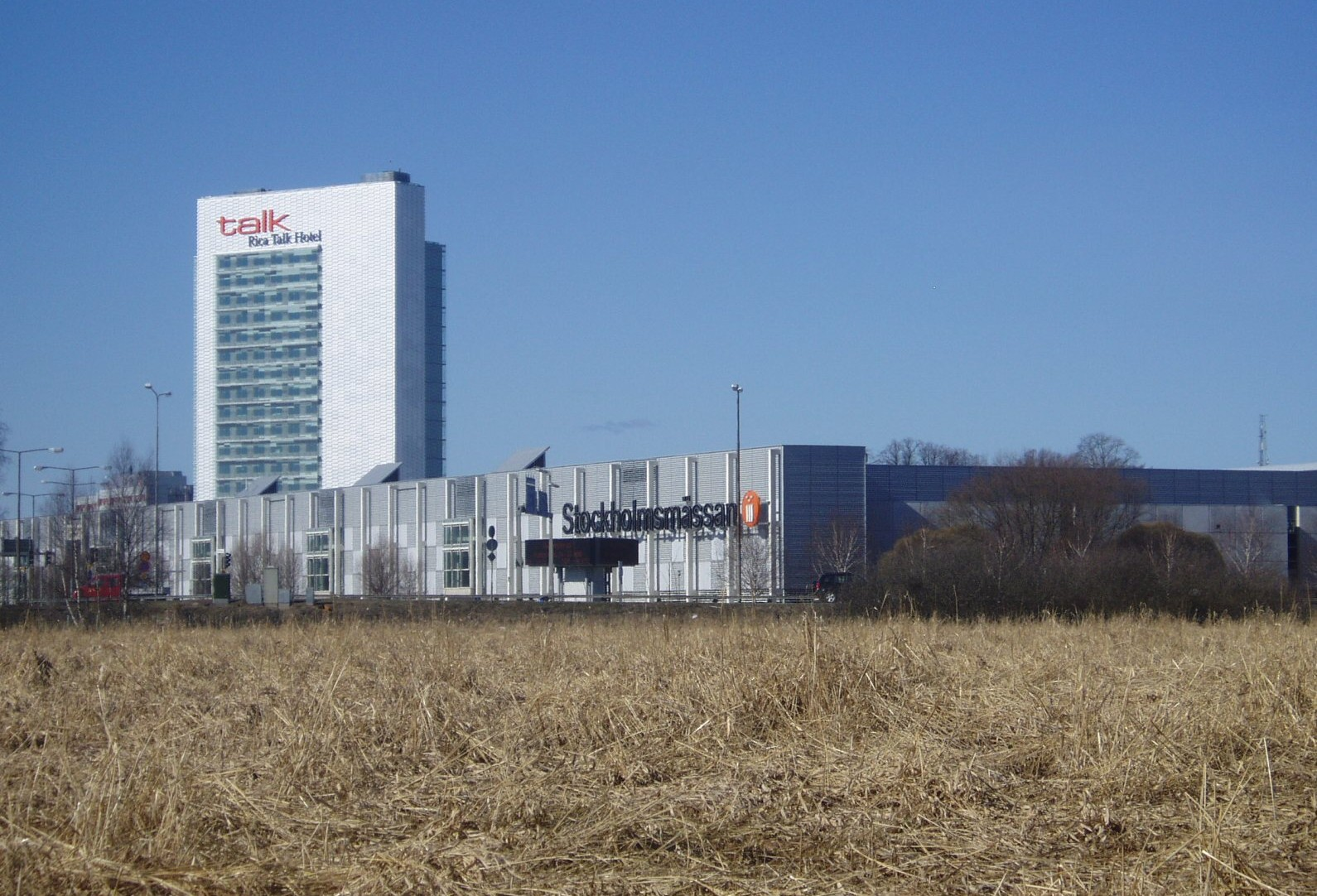
Stockholmsmässan, with Scandic Talk Hotel in the background

Älvsjö (Swedish pronunciation: [ɛlvɧø]) is a district of the city of Stockholm Municipality in Sweden, located in the borough Älvsjö in Söderort. It has the biggest rentable facility in northern Europe called Stockholm International Fairs, and also the hotel Scandic Talk Hotel, which both are located east of Älvsjö commuter train station. In 2017, the total population of the district was 1,530 inhabitants.

The name was written Elffuesio in 1461. The origin of the first element is unclear – it is possibly derived from an Old Swedish male name *Ælve, but that interpretation is uncertain. The last element sjö 'lake' refers to Brännkyrkasjön, a former lake east of Älvsjö.
