= Christer Sjögren =

Swedish singer, songwriter and musician

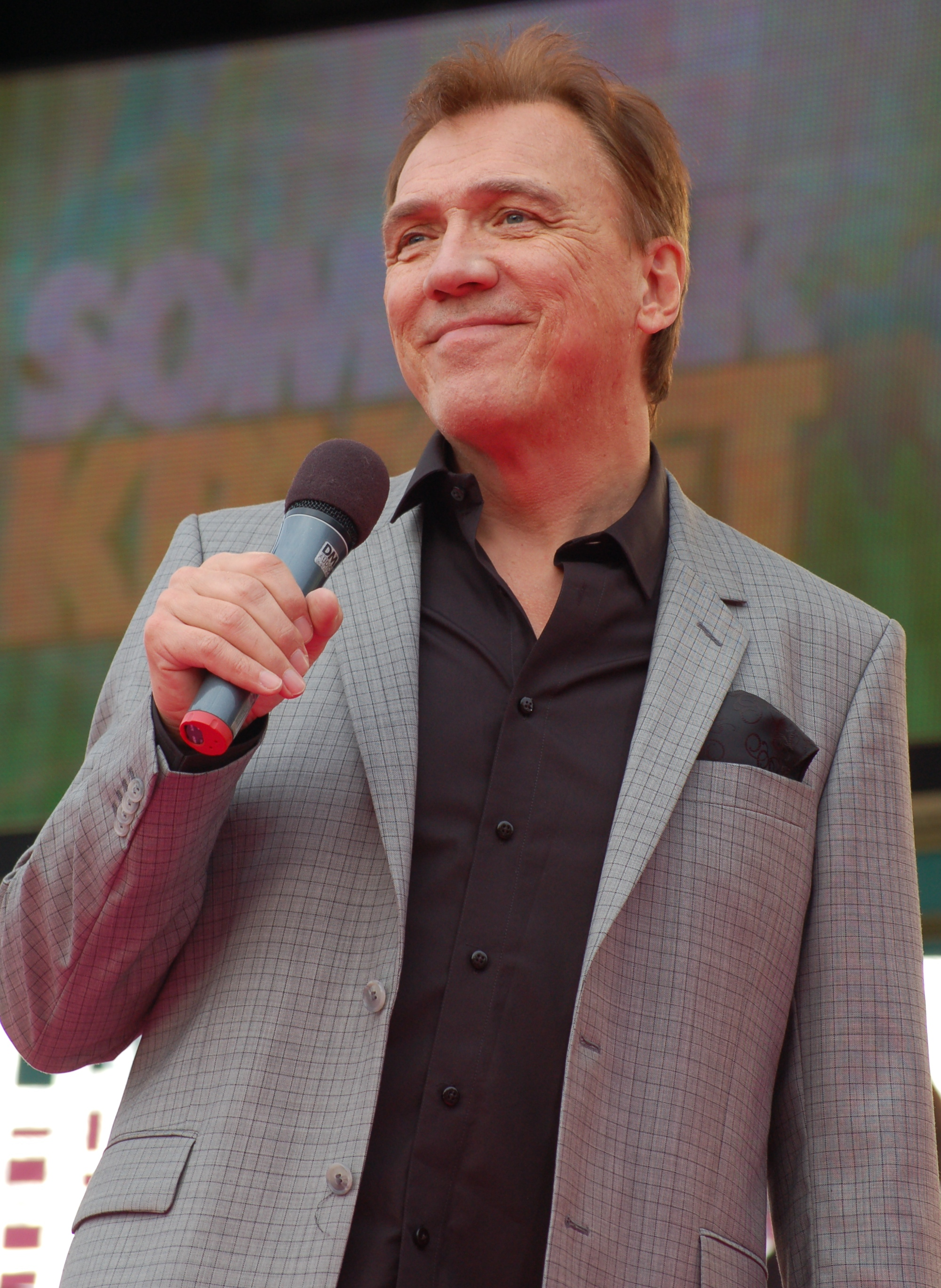
- Sjögren performing in August 2008

Background information
- Born: Hans Christer Sjögren; 6 April 1950 (age 76); Hagfors, Sweden
- Genres: Dansband; rock; schlager
- Occupations: Singer, songwriter
- Instruments: Vocals, bass guitar
- Formerly of: Vikingarna
- Website: christersjogren.se

Hans Christer Sjögren (Swedish pronunciation: [hɑːns ˈkrɪ̌sːtɛr ˈɧø̂ːɡreːn]; born 6 April 1950) is a Swedish singer, songwriter and musician. He is best known as the lead vocalist of the dansband group Vikingarna.

== Early life ==
Hans Christer Sjögren was born in Hagfors, Sweden, on 6 April 1950, as the child of Eivor (née Östling) and Hans Sjögren.

== Career ==
=== 1978–2004: Vikingarna ===
On 15 September 1978, Stefan Borsch left the band and Sjögren reluctantly became their lead singer.

The first album by Vikingarna with Christer Sjögren as singer is "Kramgoa låtar 7", released in 1979.

=== 2008–present ===
He competed in Melodifestivalen 2008, the Swedish preselection for the Eurovision Song Contest. Taking one of the two top spots in the first semi-final, his song "I Love Europe" was qualified for the final in the Globe Arena on 15 March 2008. He finished in 9th place. In 2018, he appears on Så mycket bättre which is broadcast on TV4.

== Personal life ==
Sjögren is married to Birgitta Sjögren.

Since the early 2000s, Christer Sjögren lives in Hammarö, outside Karlstad, Sweden.

== Legacy ==
=== Awards and honours ===
- 2005: Royal Norwegian Order of Merit

== Discography ==
Solo

- Andliga sånger (1989)
- Andliga sånger 2 (1993)
- När ljusen ska tändas därhemma (1994) (Christmas album)
- Varför är solen så röd (1996)
- Ett julkort från förr (2000) (Christmas album)
- För kärlekens skull (2003)
- Älskade andliga sånger (2007)
- 40 år med Christer Sjögren (2008)
- Schlagerminnen (2009)
- En stjärna lyser i natt (2010) (Christmas album)
- Kramgoa låtar 2011 (2011)

Other

- Love Me Tender (2005) (covers album)
- King Creole (2006) (covers album)
- Mitt sköna sextiotal (2008) (covers album)
- Lotta & Christer (2012) (with Lotta Engberg)
- Christer Sjögren sjunger Sinatra (2014) (covers album)

== Filmography ==
=== Television ===
Year	Title	Role	Notes
2007	Leende guldbruna ögon	Himself	Mini series, 1 episode
