= Musik, dans & party 2 =

Studio album by Sten & Stanley
- Released: 1986
- Genre: dansband music
- Length: circa 47 minutes
- Label: Scranta

Sten & Stanley chronology
Musik, dans & party (1985)	Musik, dans & party 2 (1986)	Musik, dans & party 3 (1987)

Musik, dans & party 2 is a 1986 studio album by Sten & Stanley.

== Track listing ==
1. Tillsammans
2. Han sjunger om kärlek
3. Den vita duvan
4. Jag vill vakna upp med dig (I Wanna Wake up with You)
5. Jorden är så skön
6. I ditt fönster brinner ett ljus (In deinem Zimmer brennt noch Licht)
7. Har vi träffats förr nå'n gång (Midnight Lady)
8. En sång om kärlek (Härlighetens morgon)
9. Skynda dig hem (Dio come vorrei)
10. Fast för dej (Stuck with You)
11. Blad faller tyst som tårar (Leaves are the Tears of Autmn)
12. Ta det lugnt (Walk Right Back)
13. Det var en underlig historia (Giorni senza gloria)
14. Living Doll.

== Charts ==
Chart (1987)	Peak position
Sweden (Sverigetopplistan)	44
