= Musik, dans & party 4 =

Studio album by Sten & Stanley
- Released: 1988
- Genre: dansband music
- Label: Scranta

Sten & Stanley chronology
| Musik, dans & party 3 (1987) | Musik, dans & party 4 (1988) | Minnets melodi (1989) |

Musik, dans & party 4 is a 1988 studio album by Sten & Stanley.

== Track listing ==
1. Kärleken
2. Tack för alla åren
3. Stormande hav
4. Högt uppe på berget (On Top of the Old Smokey)
5. Milda makter
6. Låt tiden stå still (One Moment in Time)
7. Var det igår (What Do You Want to Make those Eyes at Me for)
8. I ett litet hus
9. Hand i hand (Hand in Hand)
10. Rita
11. Leende guldbruna ögon (Beautiful Brown Eyes)
12. Tid (A Bunch of Thyme)
13. Klättra upp för stegen (Tie a Yellow Ribbon)
14. Försent skall syndar'n vakna (Today's Teardrops)

== Charts ==
| Chart (1988–1989) | Peak position |
|---|---|
| Sweden (Sverigetopplistan) | 34 |
