= Ann-Louise =

Ann-Louise is a feminine double name. Notable people with the name include:

- Ann Louise Bardach (born 1950), American journalist and non-fiction author
- Ann-Louise Edstrand (born 1975), Swedish ice hockey player
- Ann Louise Gilligan (1945–2017), Irish theologian
- Ann Louise Gittleman (born 1949), American nutritionist
- Ann-Louise Hanson (born 1944), Swedish singer
- Ann-Louise Peters (born 1975), Danish darts player
- Ann-Louise Skoglund (born 1962), Swedish female hurdler and short-distance runner

== See also ==
- Lilla Ann-Louise, song
