= Musik, dans & party =

Studio album by Sten & Stanley
- Released: 1985
- Genre: dansband music
- Label: Scranta

Sten & Stanley chronology
God jul (1984)	Musik, dans & party (1985)	Musik, dans & party 2 (1986)

Musik, dans & party is a 1985 studio album by Sten & Stanley.

== Track listing ==
1. Glöm inte bort mig än (Quando un amore se ne va)
2. Dra dit pepparn växer (Don't Play a Sad Song after Midnight)
3. Farväl till sommaren
4. Syner i lövsprickningen
5. Då och nu (Jersey Girl)
6. Kom hem igen (Komm heim zu mir)
7. Du är den ende som jag tänder på (Excitable)
8. Längtan är en svala (Love is a Rainbow)
9. Dansa samba (Malanotte no)
10. Minnenas väg (Que cansada estoy)
11. Var rädd om den som har dig riktigt kär
12. Jag kunde aldrig glömma digNära (Cara)
13. Hemlig kärlek (Part-time Lover)

== Charts ==
Chart (1985)	Peak position
Sweden (Sverigetopplistan	27
