= Musik, dans & party 6 =

Studio album by Sten & Stanley
- Released: 1992
- Genre: dansband music
- Label: Scranta

Sten & Stanley chronology
På begäran (1992)	Musik, dans & party 6 (1992)	Musik, dans & party 8 (1993)

Musik, dans & party 6 is a 1991 studio album by Sten & Stanley.

== Track listing ==
1. "På en öde ö i havet" (T. Varnick - N. Acquaviva - E. Sandström)
2. "Spar dina tårar" (R-M. Stråhle)
3. "Åh, stackars mej" ("Oh Lonesome Me") (D. Gibson - H. Nilsson)
4. "Fristen" (M. Wiehe)
5. "Jambalaya (On the Bayou)" (H. Williams)
6. "Om och om igen" (U. Nordqvist - A. Gunnarsson)
7. "Säg är det kärlek" (S. Nilsson - M. Forsberg)
8. "Där björkarna susa" (O. Merikano - V. Sund)
9. "Varje dag" (E. Lihm - P. Hermansson)
10. "En gyllene ring" (L. Sandberg)
11. "Spara sista dansen för mej" ("Save the Last Dance for Me") (D. Pomus - M. Shuman - M. Åkerlund)
12. "Jag har aldrig lovat dig en himmel" (S. Nilsson - M. Forsberg)
13. "Mitt bästa för dig" (P. Rogefeldt)
14. "Framtidstro" (U. Nordquist - U. Nordquist - S. Nilsson)
15. "Bye Bye Love" (F. Bryant - B. Bryant - K. Almgren)
16. "För varje dag som går" (J. Frankfurter - I. Holder - M. Forsberg)

== Charts ==
Chart (1991)	Peak position
Sweden (Sverigetopplistan)	40
