= Musik, dans & party 9 =

Studio album by Sten & Stanley
- Released: 1994
- Genre: dansband music
- Label: Scranta

Sten & Stanley chronology
Musik, dans & party 8 (1993)	Musik, dans & party 9 (1994)	Musik, dans & party 10 (1995)

Musik, dans & party 9 is a 1994 studio album by Sten & Stanley.

== Track listing ==
1. "Jag ger dig en blomma" (Gunnarsson - Lord)
2. "Så jag tog gitarren" (Gunnarsson - Lord)
3. "Corrine, Corrina" (J.M. Williams - B. Chatman - M. Parish)
4. "En vind som blåser" (G. Reis - L-Å. Andersson)
5. "Bara när jag blundar" (T. Andersson - H. Pärn)
6. "Leka med elden" ("Ginny Come Lately") (G. Geld - P. Udell - A. Forss)
7. "Nu leker livet igen" ("Love's Gonna Live Here") (B. Owens - M. Forsberg)
8. "Mina ord till dig" (Wendt - Lundh)
9. "Kommer du till sommaren" (Gunnarsson - Lord)
10. "Adress Rosenhill" ("Mockin' Bird Hill") (V. Horton - G. Carnerstam)
11. "Jag ser en bit av himlen" (S. Nilsson - K. Almgren - S. Nilsson)
12. "Min" ("Still") (D. Burton - H. Plummer - M. Forsberg)
13. "Någonstans i Spanien" ("Spanish Harlem") (P. Spector - J. Leiber - O. Bergman)

== Charts ==
Chart (1994)	Peak position
Sweden (Sverigetopplistan)	17
