= Earcandy Six =

Studio album by Black Ingvars
- Released: 1995
- Genre: Heavy metal
- Length: circa 41 minutes

Black Ingvars chronology
Earcandy Six (1995)	Earcandy Five (1995)

Earcandy Six is the debut studio album from Swedish heavy metal band Black Ingvars. It was released in 1995.

== Track listing ==
1. "De sista ljuva åren"
2. "Inget stoppar oss nu"
3. "Två mörka ögon"
4. "Gråt inga tårar"
5. "Tiotusen röda rosor"
6. "Mitt eget Blue Hawaii"
7. "Eloise"
8. "Leende guldbruna ögon"
9. "Dra dit pepparn växer"
10. "Flamingomedley"
  1. Hon är sexton år idag (Happy Birthday Sweet Sixteen)
  2. Kärleksbrev i sanden (Love Letters in the Sand)
  3. Tintarella di luna
  4. Nu är det lördag igen (Another Saturday Night)
  5. Eviva España
11. "I natt är jag din"

== Charts ==
Chart (1995)	Peak position
Norway	26
Sweden	5
