= Den vita duvan =

Song by Mats Rådberg

from the album På egen hand
- Language: Swedish
- Released: 1975
- Genre: country
- Label: Polydor
- Songwriters: Lasse Holm; Alf Robertson

"Den vita duvan" (The White Dove) is an anti-war song written by Lasse Holm and Alf Robertson. It was originally recorded by Mats Rådberg on his 1975 studio album På egen hand. He also scored a Svensktoppen hit with the song, charting for eleven weeks between 4 May – 13 July 1975, topping the chart.

The song has also been recorded by Sten & Stanley on the 1987 album Musik, dans & party 2 1987 and by Leif Hagbergs on the album Låtar vi minns 6.

The Mats Rådberg version is one of the titles in the book Tusen svenska klassiker (2009).

== See also ==
- List of anti-war songs
