= Musik, dans & party 10 =

Studio album by Sten & Stanley
- Released: 1995
- Genre: dansband music
- Label: Scranta

Sten & Stanley chronology
Musik, dans & party 9 (1994)	Musik, dans & party 10 (1995)	Julnatt (1995)

Musik, dans & party 10 is a 1995 studio album by Sten & Stanley.

== Track listing ==
1. "Vänd inte om"
2. "Båten ut i skärgår'n" ("Sea Cruise")
3. "Du är min bästa vän"
4. "Kärleken kommer, kärleken går"
5. "Låt månen lysa"
6. "Det är aldrig försent"
7. "A Rockin' Good Way"
8. "Livet är musik" (vocals: Sven-Erik Magnusson)
9. "Ängel i natt" ("The Power of Love")
10. "Jag ger dig tusen kramar"
11. "Hjälp mig ur min ensamhet" ("Help Me Make It Through the Night")
12. "Tiden läker sår" ("Nobody Loves You When You're Free")
13. "I Washed My Hands in Muddy Water"
14. "Jag svär" ("I Swear")
15. "Café Nostalgi" ("Club at the End of the Street")

== Charts ==
Chart (1995)	Peak position
Sweden (Sverigetopplistan)	10
