= Musik, dans & party 7 =

Studio album by Sten & Stanley
- Released: 1992
- Genre: dansband music
- Label: Scranta

Sten & Stanley chronology
På begäran (1992)	Musik, dans & party 7 (1992)	Musik, dans & party 8 (1993)

Musik, dans & party 7 is a 1992 studio album by Sten & Stanley.

== Track listing ==
1. "Tusen tack för alla dessa år" (P. Sahlin)
2. "Sugartime" (C. Philips - O. Echols - E. Sandström)
3. "En vän som du" (T. Gunnarsson - E. Lord)
4. "Dansa en dans med mig" ("Ten Guitars") (G. Mills - S. Andersson)
5. "Da Doo Ron Ron" (P. Spector - E. Greenwich - J. Barry - L. Löfstrand - Y. Selberg)
6. "Andante, Andante" (B. Andersson - B. Ulvaeus - I. Forsman)
7. "Vid din trädgårdsgrind" (P. Sahlin)
8. "Vissa blommor vissnar aldrig" (M. Ekwall)
9. "Åh, Carol" ("Oh! Carol") (H. Greenfield - N. Sedaka - B. Carlsson)
10. "Du sa farväl" (E. Nilsson - A. Svensson)
11. "Passar det inte så går jag" (T. Gunnarsson - E. Lord)
12. "Nu längtar jag hem" ("Detroit City") (D. Dill - M. Tills - O. Bergman)
13. "Över land, över hav" (S. Nilsson - K. Almgren)
14. "Angeline" ("Bernardine") (J. Mercer - I. Forsman)

== Charts ==
Chart (1992)	Peak position
Sweden (Sverigetopplistan)	32
