= Castlebar Song Contest =

Annual international song contest in Ireland

- Genre: Song competition
- Created by: Castlebar Chamber of Commerce
- Country of origin: Ireland
- Original languages: English; Irish

Original release
- Network: RTÉ, RTÉ Radio 1
- Release: 1966 – 1988

The Castlebar Song Contest was an annual international song contest that was first staged in 1966 in Castlebar, County Mayo, Ireland. The contest was initially organised by the Castlebar Chamber of Commerce as part of a drive to increase tourism in the town. It was hoped that the competition would produce a song that would make the town famous, just as songs such as "The Rose of Tralee", "Galway Bay", or "Mary from Dungloe" had done for their respective towns. The first contest had 70 entries from the UK and Ireland, and the final was hosted by Gay Byrne. The winning song bore the Irish version of the town's name, Caisleán A' Bharraigh.

== Information ==
After the first contest, the emphasis changed from finding a song named after the town to one of promoting the town through attracting composers, of various genres, from all over the world to the town. This strategy was successful and the town (and some of the neighbouring towns) were thronged with contest participants for the first week of October for the remainder of the contest's life. From humble beginnings with a mere £50 in prizes, the event grew in status to a point where its prize money at £20,000 was bettered only by the Yamaha Song Contest in Japan.

In 1981, the future of the song contest became political when it was debated in Dáil Éireann.

== Broadcast ==
In 1970, the contest was recorded for television by RTÉ (the national television station) and transmitted on the following Sunday. The 1971 and 1973 contests were similarly recorded and shown later. However, the 1974 contest was broadcast live from the Old Royal Ballroom and Theatre and Travellers Friend Hotel in Castlebar nationally on RTÉ. Apart from 1987, when there was no contest, the event enjoyed live television coverage from 1974 until the event finished in 1988. James Haldane O'Hare was the TV Designer for RTÉ for the majority of the broadcasts.

== Winners ==
List of winners
Year	Section	Composer	Singer(s)	Song title	Country
1966	Overall	Sheila Fawsitt-Stewart	Dragoons	"Caisleán A' Bharraigh"	Ireland
1967	Folk/Ballad	Peter McKenzie	McLoughlin Folk Group	"Where Did They Go"	Ireland
1967	Pop	Vera Traynor	Butch Moore	"No One Else"	Ireland
1967	Straight	Andy Galligan	Joan Connolly	"One and One"	Ireland
1968	Folk/Ballad	Joe Burkett/Tony Hyland	City Folk	"Dividing Line"	Ireland
1968	Pop	Eileen Coyle	Tony Keeling	"The World is Ours Today"	Ireland
1968	Straight	Sean Sharkey/Eddie Masterson	Pat Lynch & Airchords	"Reflections of You"	Ireland
1969	Folk/Ballad	Ruth Kiernan	Tara Folk	"Soldier Boy"	Ireland
1969	Pop	Mai O'Higgins/John McBreen	Gary Street & Fairways	"Jodi"	Ireland
1969	Straight	Pat Walsh	Joe Doherty & Millionaires	"A Country & Western Song"	Ireland
1970	Folk/Ballad	Noel and Alan Connaughton	Melody Fayre	"Mary I'm Nay Leaving You"	Ireland
1970	Pop	John Lavery	Gerry & Ohio	"One Step Away"	Ireland
1970	Straight	Seamus McHugh/John Fahy	Red Hurley	"The World Is Such An Empty Place"	Ireland
1971	Folk/Ballad	Vic Dawton	Joe Cuddy	"Diana of the Roses"	England
1971	Pop	Michael Murphy	La Salle	"Feeling I've Got It Made"	Ireland
1971	Country	Donal McGrath/K. Doohan	Ian Corrigan	"Slumbering Goldmine"	Ireland
1971	Overall	Michael Murphy	La Salle	"Feeling I've Got It Made"	Ireland
1972	Folk/Ballad	Sheila Roberts	Frank Holder	"Song for Jenny"	Ireland
1972	Pop	Dick Farrelly	Mary Lou	"That's What Love Is Made Of"	Ireland
1972	Country	Teresa O'Donnell	Gerry Cronin	"He Travels Fastest"	Ireland
1972	Straight	Pat Coyle	Helen Jordan	"Shall I Ride"	Ireland
1972	Overall	Sheila Roberts	Frank Holder	"Song for Jenny"	Ireland
1973	Overall	Vince Hill/Ernie Dunstall	Joe Cuddy	"I'm Gonna Make It"	England
1974	Overall	Cathal Dunne	Cathal Dunne	"Shalom"	Ireland
1974	Country	Tibor Koncz/Iván Szenes	Kati Kovács	"Roses Are Red, Violets Are Blue"	Hungary
1975	Overall	Joe Burkett/Andy Galligan	Des Smyth	"Roulette"	Ireland
1976	Joint Winners	Ray Davies Teresa O'Donnell/Joe Bollard	Tony Steven T. O'Donnell/Joe Bollard	"My Woman" "Let's Star All Over"	England Ireland
1977	Overall	John Brown	John Brown/Mary Clifford	"You are My Destiny"	Ireland
1978	Overall	Sarah Byron/Liam Hurley	Sarah Bryan	"Onion"	England
1979	Overall	Zack Laurence/Paul Ferguson	Kim Goody	"Talkin' to a Stone"	England
1980	Overall	Ed Welch/Barry Mason	Linda Jardim	"Don't Stay for the Sake of the Children"	England
1981	Overall	Miki Antony/Robin Smith	Carol Kenyon	"I Wasn't Born Yesterday"	England
1982	Overall	Barry Mason/Don Gould	Barry Mason	"Big Enough for Me & You"	England
1983	Overall	Shay Healy	Linda Martin	"Edge of the Universe"	Ireland
1984	Overall	Brian O'Reilly	Brian O'Reilly	"Spread Your Wings"	Ireland
1985	Overall	Ulf Nordquist	Sten & Stanley	"Don't Play A Sad Song After Midnight"	Sweden
1986	Overall	Tim Norell & Ola Håkonsson	KATZ	"Oh, Johnny Dance With Me Tonight"	Sweden
1988	Overall	Brendan Graham	Linda Martin	"If I Should Ever Lose Your Love"	Ireland
