= Jag har inte tid =

Studio album by Sten & Stanley
- Released: 1984
- Genre: dansband music
- Label: Scranta

Sten & Stanley chronology
Adios Amor (1983)	Jag har inte tid (1984)	God jul (1984)

Jag har inte tid is a 1984 studio album by Sten & Stanley.

== Track listing ==
1. Auf wiederseh'n Cherie
2. Wiktoria (Drömmaren på berget)
3. Till sist (Danach)
4. Amore amore
5. Låt mej få veta vem du är (Ich will nicht weissen)
6. Tre små ord
7. Törnfåglarna (The Thorn Birds)
8. Jag har inte tid
9. Det blir morgon (Serenata)
10. Två människor (Wodu bist)
11. Fri som en vind (Free Like a Bird)
12. Ställ dej sist i kön
13. Det händer aldrig igen (Never Never)
14. Ett sjumastat skepp (Ein schneeweisses Schiff)

== Charts ==
Chart (1984)	Peak position
Sweden (Sverigetopplistan)	46
