= Beautiful Brown Eyes =

Song
- Language: English
- Songwriter: Alton Delmore

"Beautiful Brown Eyes" is a country song written by Alton Delmore, originally inspired by his oldest daughter. One of the best known versions of the song was originally arranged by Fiddlin' Arthur Smith and Alton Delmore of The Delmore Brothers in 1951. An award was presented to Alton Delmore for "Beautiful Brown Eyes" in 1951.

== Background ==
The lyrics are sung from the perspective of a woman unlucky in love, divorced, and remarried, who will "never love blue eyes again".

== Recordings ==
The following recordings are credited to Smith and Delmore only:

- Rosemary Clooney 1951 - reached number 11 on Billboard Pop charts in 1951 (Rosemary Clooney discography), reissued on the album, Rosemary Clooney Sings Country Hits from the Heart.
- Ethel Smith (organist) 1951
- "Beautiful Brown Eyes", Jimmy Wakely and the Les Baxter Chorus - in 1951. This recording peaked at number 5 on the Best Selling Retail Folk Records chart.
- "Beautiful Brown Eyes" (Alton Delmore, Arthur Smith) from Hum & Strum Along with Chet Atkins
- Dickson Hall And The Country All-Stars
- Evelyn Knight With The Ray Charles Singers 1951
- Lisa Kirk 1951
- Mimi Martel 1952
- Gene Vincent 1959
- The Belvedere Chorale 1959
- Kitty Wells 1960
- The Manhattans Golden World Records 1964
- Grady Martin And The Slew Foot Five 1965

The following credit Smith, Delmore and also Jerry Capehart (1928-1998) who would have only been 23 when the original Smith-Delmore version was published.

- The Brothers Four (BMOC: Best Music On/Off Campus) (A. Smith, A. Delmore, J. Capehart) 1960
- Judy, Johnny and Billy 1960 - an otherwise unknown trio for whom this was the only single
- King Curtis 1962
- Kathy Linden released a version of the song as a B-side to her 1962 single "Remember Me (To Jimmy)".
- The Essential Glen Campbell Volume Three

== Other songs ==
Solomon Burke, the Brothers Four, Billy Walker, Connie Francis, Chet Atkins, and Roy Acuff.

- "Beautiful Brown Eyes" Trad. Connie Francis Sings Folk Song Favorites
- "Beautiful Brown Eyes" Trad. Arr.: O. Henry, hit for Sir Henry and his Butlers 1966
- "Beautiful Brown Eyes" Solomon Burke discography B-side 1964 on album Rock 'n' Soul. Covered by Colleen Hewett of The Laurie Allen Revue, single August 1967.
- "Beautiful Brown Eyes" written by Grace Walters, an otherwise unknown Motown discography writer, for The Freeman Brothers produced by Berry Gordy, Jr., and covered on The Country and Western Sound of Jazz Pianos.

== See also ==
- Gary Young (Australian musician) singles on Festival – "Beautiful Brown Eyes" (August 1967)
- Teddy Nelson Norwegian singer 1966
- Discography of Nico Carstens Beautiful Brown Eyes | Columbia 33JSX 11011
- Beautiful Brown Eyes List of Jo Stafford compilation albums (2000–09)
