= Dra dit pepparn växer =

Song by Sten & Stanley

from the album "Musik, dans & party"
- Language: Swedish
- Released: 1985
- Genre: dansband music
- Label: Scranta
- Songwriter: Ulf Nordquist
- Composer: Ulf Nordquist

"Dra dit pepparn växer" is a song written by Ulf Nordquist, and originally recorded by Sten & Stanley on the 1985 album Musik, dans & party. The song was also recorded in English, as "Don't Play a Sad Song after Midnight", and was released as a single. This version was entered into the "Castlebar Song Contest" of that year, which it ultimately won.

The song entered the Svensktoppen chart, where it stayed for 10 weeks during the period of 27 October- 29 December 1985, it peaked number two for two weeks.

== Other recordings ==
- Leif Hultgren - 1985 on the album Costa Ricas ros.
- Stig-Roland Holmbom - 1986 on the album Främmande länder.
- Black Ingvars - 1995 on the album Earcandy Six.
- Norwegian country band "Nystogs". "Du kan dra dit pepper'n gror"

At Dansbandskampen 2009 the song was performed by Swedish dansband Casanovas. Their recording was also added for the official Dansbandskampen 2009 compilation album.
