= Jag vill vara din, Margareta =

Song by Sten & Stanley

from the album "Bella Bella"
- Language: Swedish
- Released: 1976
- Genre: dansband music
- Label: Decca
- Songwriter: Jan-Eric Karlzon
- Composer: Jan-Eric Karlzon

"Jag vill vara din, Margareta", is a song written by Jan-Eric Karlzon for a woman named Margareta, who at the time used to live in Karlskoga. With the song, Sten & Stanley scored a 1976 Svensktoppen hit, staying at the chart for 10 weeks (rules back then had a maximum of 10 weeks for a song). The song topped the chart for seven weeks, peaking for first time on 14 August 1976. The song was recorded at the 1976 Sten & Stanley album Bella Bella. Throughout the years, the song has become one of the Sten & Stanley "signature songs".

The song has been performed several times at Dansbandskampen -- Glennartz performed it at Dansbandskampen 2008; Bhonus performed it at Dansbandskampen 2009; and Willez performed it at Dansbandskampen 2010.

== Other recordings ==
In 1979 Nils Dacke recorded the song on the album Nils Dacke spelar partyorgel 2.

A recording by Lars Vegas trio stayed at Svensktoppen for one weeks, at 9th place, on 12 April 1992.

Bröderna Brothers recorded the song in 1990, as B-side for the single "Blommorna och jag" (MNWS 146).

AIK-trubaduren did an own version, called "Hetast när det gäller".
