= Musik, dans & party 8 =

Studio album by Sten & Stanley
- Released: 1993
- Genre: dansband music
- Label: Scranta

Sten & Stanley chronology
Musik, dans & party 7 (1992)	Musik, dans & party 8 (1993)	Musik, dans & party 9 (1994)

Musik, dans & party 8 is a 1993 studio album by Sten & Stanley.

== Track listing ==
1. "Rosor doftar alltid som mest när det skymmer" (Gunnarsson - Lord)
2. "Snälla du" ("Lover Please") (B. Swan - I. Forsman)
3. "Jag skriver sånger" (P. Bergqvist - H. Backström)
4. "Hello Josephine" (A. Domino - D. Bartholomew)
5. "Är det kärlek på gång" (S. Nilsson - K. Almgren)
6. "Nere i hamnen" ("Under the Boardwalk") (A. Resnick - K. Young - I. Forsman)
7. "När du skrattar och ler" (B. Nilsson)
8. "Blommor och bin" ("The Birds and the Bees") (B. Newman - B. Stuart - K. Almgren)
9. "Är du ensam du som jag" (Gunnarsson - Lord)
10. "En så'n underbar känsla" ("It's a Real Good Feeling") (V. Promo - H. Steinhauer - E. Nilsson - A. Svensson)
11. "Sänd inga rosor mer" (E. Nilsson - A. Svensson)
12. "Candida" (T. Wine - I. Levine - I. Forsman)
13. "Glöm inte bort mig" (Gunnarsson - Lord)
14. "Blueberry Hill" (A. Lewis - L. Stock - V. Rose)
15. "Söndag min lediga dag" ("Beautiful Sunday") (D. Boone - R. McQueen - A-G. Glenmark)
16. "Mitt hjärta" (M. Ekwall)
