= James Haldane O'Hare =

British costume designer

Jim O'Hare
- Born: James Haldane O'Hare; 4 August 1941 (age 84); Edinburgh, Scotland
- Died: 3rd March 2026; Norwich, United Kingdom
- Other name: James Haldane O'Hare
- Occupations: Production designer Art director

Jim O'Hare (born 4 August 1941) is a British theatrical scenic and costume designer.

== Biography ==
O'Hare was born in Edinburgh, Scotland, on 4 August 1941. His parents were James O'Hare, an accountant for a theatrical company, and Helen. In 1949 Jim's family moved to London, where he attended Hornsey Art School, followed by the Central College of Art, where he met his wife, Marian Anderson, the daughter of Donald Clive Anderson and English writer Verily Anderson.

== Theatrical career ==
O'Hare began his career in 1964 by designing the sets and costumes for the Victoria Hall theatre in Leatherhead, Surrey. He went on to design the costumes and sets for many theatrical productions especially in Dublin, Ireland.

== TV career ==
In 1961 the Irish television station RTÉ started broadcasting and recruited professionals from overseas. In 1965 O'Hare was offered the position of Production Designer for RTÉ at their Donnybrook Studios. O'Hare designed the sets for the Castlebar Song Contest for most of its life from 1970 to 1988 O'Hare designed the children's TV show Wonderly Waggon after a family horse drawn holiday in County Cork.

== Film career ==
- Mary Shelley's Frankenstein (1994) (dressing consultant)
