= Bella Bella (album) =

Studio album by Sten & Stanley
- Released: 1976
- Genre: Dansband music
- Label: Decca
- Producer: Ebbe Nilsson

Sten & Stanley chronology
Sten & Stanleys bästa bitar (1975)	Bella Bella (1976)	Jambalaya (1976)

Bella Bella is a 1976 studio album by Sten & Stanley.

== Track listing ==
No.	Title	Length
1.	"Bella Bella"	3:15
2.	"Vilken skillnad en dag gör" ("What a Diff'rence a Day Made")"	4:35
3.	"Da svidanje"	3:07
4.	"That's the Way (I Like It)"	3:50
5.	"Tänk om du tänker på mig nu" ("I'd Love You to Want Me")"	3:25
6.	""Putti putti""	2:30
7.	"Himmelsfärgat Blåa Ögon"	2:22
8.	"Jag vill vara din, Margareta"	3:42
9.	"I'm on Fire"	2:49
10.	"Fernando"	3:50
11.	"Ramaya"	2:50
12.	"Det är dej som jag behöver (It's Only Make Believe)"	2:55
13.	"So Long"	3:33
14.	"Ett poem om våren"	2:51

== Charts ==
Chart (1976)	Peak position
Sweden (Sverigetopplistan)	27
