= Lilla Ann-Louise =

Song by Sten & Stanley

from the album Sten & Stanleys bästa bitar
- Language: Swedish
- A-side: "Har du nånsin"
- Released: 1974
- Genre: dansband music
- Label: Decca
- Songwriters: Ebbe Nilsson, Acke Svensson

Lilla Ann-Louise is a song written by Ebbe Nilsson and Acke Svensson, and released in 1974 as B-side for the single Har du nånsin, released under Sten Nilsson's solo artist name. As released under Sten & Stanley's name the song charted at Svensktoppen for eleven weeks between 12 May-21 July 1974. and it also appeared at the band's 1975 compilation album Sten & Stanleys bästa bitar.

The song was also recorded by Lasse Green on his 1975 album Tjugoåtta sköna tjejer by Alf-Oles on the 1985 album Alf-Oles 6 and by Dannys on the 1988 album Baldakinenbandet: vol. 25.
