= Musik, dans & party 3 =

Studio album by Sten & Stanley
- Released: 1987
- Genre: dansband music
- Label: Scranta

Sten & Stanley chronology
En god och glad jul (1986)	Musik, dans & party 3 (1987)	Musik, dans & party 4 (1988)

Musik, dans & party 3 is a 1987 studio album by Sten & Stanley.

== Track listing ==
1. En vanlig dag (Wolverton Mountains) (M.Kilgore-M.Forsberg)
2. Vindens melodi (G.Lindberg-G.Lengstrand)
3. Den gamla goda tiden (U.Nordqvist-M.Forsberg)
4. Glad som en speleman (Lill-Magnus-M.Forsberg)
5. Vet att jag blev född att älska dig (Nothing's Gonna Change My Love for You) (M.Masser-G.Goffin-I.Forsman)
6. Änglar visst finns dom (Angelo Mio) (C.Bruhn-F.Thorsten-M.Forsberg)
7. It's Been a Long Time (J.Styne-S.Cahn)
8. I mitt fönster (U.Nordqvist-M.Forsberg)
9. Linnea (E.Taube)
10. The Great Pretender (B.Ram-K.Almgren)
11. Sköna söndag (T.Skogman)
12. Röd var din mun (Rot war dein Mund) (R.Dokin-A.Svensson-E.Nilsson)
13. Cocco Bello (Cocco Bello Africa) (D.farina-C.Minellono-O.Avogadro-L.Valter)
14. När jag behövde dig mest (Just When I Needed You Most) (R.vanWarmer-I.Forsman)
