= Freeman Brothers =

The Freeman Brothers were a Motown duo active 1964–1970, Johnny Mitchell, one of doo wop group The Majestics lead singers, and orchestra leader Gerald Williams. The duo left Motown after their single "My Baby" (1965) failed to achieve commercial success and continued until the single "Sally Goes Up The Ladder" on Sprout in 1970.

The Motown Freeman brothers had no connection to another band led by Rogers Freeman ex-Joey Dee and the Starliters.
