= Nico Carstens discography =

This is a discography for South African accordionist and composer Nico Carstens.

== Albums ==
=== Label ===
==== Brigadiers ====
- 1988, Brigadiers BRIGL 2021, Met Permissie (Music from the TV Series)

==== Capitol of the World Series ====
- 1957 Capitol of the World Series T10075 (USA Release), Boeremusiek

==== Columbia ====
- 19?? Columbia SSA 218, Fanagalo (First plastic non-breakable 45 single in South Africa), Peterson Brothers with Nico Carstens
- 19?? Columbia 33JS 11002, Ons Eie Volksliedjies (South African Folk Tunes), Nico Carstens and his Orchestra
- 19?? Columbia 33JSX 11002, Folk Songs, Nico Carstens en his Orchestra
- 19?? Columbia 33JS 11003, Koffiehuiskonsert, Nico Carstens and his Orchestra
- 19?? Columbia 33JSX 11003, My Hartedief, Nico Carstens en his Orchestra with Jurie Ferreira
- 19?? Columbia 33JS 11004, Braaivleisaand, Nico Carstens and his Orchestra
- 19?? Columbia 33JSX 11004, Liefdesgeluk, Nico Carstens en his Orchestra with Jurie Ferreira
- 19?? Columbia 33JS 11005, Nuwe Klanke in Konsertina Musiek, Nico Carstens and his Orchestra
- 19?? Columbia 33JS 11006, Sunny South Africa, Nico Carstens and his Orchestra
- 19?? Columbia 33JSX 11006, Sing Along With Me, Nico Carstens
- 1959 Columbia 33JS 11007, Flying High, Cherry Wainer & Nico Carstens
- 19?? Columbia 33JSX 11007, Lekker Dans, Nico Carstens
- 19?? Columbia 33JS 11008, Dis Opskud, Nico Carstens and his Boere Orkes
- 19?? Columbia 33JSX 11008, Ek Hoor 'n Melodie, Nico Carstens
- 19?? Columbia 33JS 11009, Lief en Leed, Nico Carstens and his Orchestra
- 19?? Columbia 33JSX 11009, Al die Veld is Vrolik, Nico Carstens en his Orchestra with Jurie Ferreira
- 19?? Columbia 33JS 11010, Tiekiedraai, Nico Carstens and his Orchestra with Rassie Erasmus and his Concertina
- 19?? Columbia 33JS 11011, On Safari, Nico Carstens with the Peterson Brothers
- 19?? Columbia 33JSX 11011, 40 Favourites, Nico Carstens and his Orchestra
- 19?? Columbia 33JS 11012, Rassie en Nico, Nico Carstens and Rassie Erasmus on Concertina
- 19?? Columbia 33JSX 11014 (Reissue by EMI), Under an African Sky, Nico Carstens his Orchestra and Chorus
- 1950 Columbia DE 315 (78 RPM Shellac), Oom Hans se Gemmerdans, Nico Carstens with Rassie Erasmus on Consertina
- 1954 Columbia 33JS 11001, Wisseldans, Nico Carstens and his Orchestra
- 1958 Columbia 33JS 11001X, Wisseldans Nr 2, Nico Carstens and his Orchestra
- 1959 Columbia 33JSX 11015 (Reissued as MFP SRSJ 7005), Goue Plaat, Nico Carstens and his Orchestra
- 1959 Columbia 33JS 11016, Boere Wisseldans, Nico Carstens and his Orchestra
- 1959 Columbia 33JSX 11016, Beste Wense, Nico Carstens with Dulcie Debbo and Jurie Ferreira
- 1961 Columbia 33JSX 11021, Goue Treffers, Nico Carstens and his Orchestra
- 1961 Columbia 33JSX 11022, Nico en Neels, Nico Carstens and Neels Steyn
- 1962 Columbia 33JSX 11028, Nico en Frikkie, Nico Carstens and Frikkie van Staten
- 1962 Columbia 33JSX 11030, Goue Vingers, Nico Carstens and his Orchestra
- 1962 Columbia 33JSX 11031, In die Blouberge, Nico Carstens and Neels Steyn
- 1962 Columbia 33JSX 11034 (Reissued as Hit City HC(A) 609 in 1986), Nico se Dansparty, Nico Carstens and his Orchestra
- 1962 Columbia 33JSX 11038, Springbokland, Nico Carstens and his Orchestra
- 1963 Columbia 33JSX 11044, Knoppies en Klawers, Nico Carstens and Frikkie van Staten
- 1963 Columbia 33JSX 11046, Op Toer, Nico Carstens and his Orchestra
- 1963 Columbia 33JSX 11050, Dis Totsiens nie Vaarwel, Nico Carstens and his Orchestra
- 1963 Columbia 33JSX 11052, Die Oue en die Nuwe, Nico Carstens and Neels Steyn
- 1964 Columbia 33JSX 11055, Country Holiday, Nico Carstens and his Orchestra
- 1964 Columbia 33JSX 11057, Saturday Night Party, Nico Carstens and his Orchestra
- 1964 Columbia 33JSX 11059, Die Wonderwêreld van Kammie Kamfer, Al Debbo with Nico Carstens
- 1964 Columbia 33JSX 11060, Dance with Nico and Zona, Nico Carstens with Zona Visser
- 1965 Columbia 33JSX 11063 (Reissued as MFP SRJS 7008), Net die Beste, Nico Carstens and his Orchestra with Jurie Ferreira
- 1965 Columbia 33JSX 11066, 20 Goue Jare, Nico Carstens and his Orchestra
- 1965 Columbia 33JSX 11067, Boeresport, Nico Carstens and his Orchestra
- 1965 Columbia 33JSX 11069, Kom Dans met Nico, Nico Carstens and his Orchestra
- 1966 Columbia 33JSX 11073, Dis Feestyd, Nico Carstens and his Orchestra
- 1966 Columbia 33JSX 11075, Kalahari Kaskenades, Nico Carstens and his Orchestra with Corrie Rossouw and his Concertina
- 1966 Columbia 33JSX 11076, Laat ons Dans, Nico Carstens and his Orchestra
- 1966 Columbia 33JSX 11079, Nico en Adam, Nico Carstens and his Orchestra with Adam Grobler
- 1966 Columbia JSX 11082, Akkordeon Skoffel, Nico Carstens and his Orchestra
- 1967 Columbia JSX 11087, Lekker Dans, Nico Carstens and his Orchestra
- 1967 Columbia JSX 11088, Nog 'n Nico en Adam Treffer, Nico Carstens and his Orchestra with Adam Grobler
- 1967 Columbia JSX 11089, Opskud!, Nico Carstens and his Orchestra with Peter Wolmerans
- 1967 Columbia JSX 11091, Nog 'n Dansie, Nico Carstens and his Orchestra
- 1967 Columbia JSX 11092, Emma Kolemma, Nico Carstens and his Orchestra
- 1967 Columbia JSX 11093, Goue Klawers, Nico Carstens and his Orchestra
- 1967 Columbia JSX 11094, Dans tot Hoenderkraai, Nico Carstens and his Orchestra with Theuns Botes on Concertina
- 1967 Columbia JSX 11104, Party Time-Tyd, Nico Carstens and his Orchestra
- 1968 Columbia JSX 11117, Parade, Nico Carstens and his Orchestra
- 1968 Columbia JSX 11124 (Reissued by MFP), Baas Jack, Al Debbo with Nico Carstens and his Orchestra
- 1968 Columbia JSX 11125, Africa Go Go, Nico Carstens and his Orchestra
- 1968 Columbia JSX 11135, Sonbrilletjies, Al Debbo with Nico Carstens and his Orchestra
- 1969 Columbia JSX 11138, Net die Beste Vol 2, Jurie Ferreira with Nico Carstens
- 1969 Columbia JSX 11142, Die Beste van Al en Nico, Al Debbo with Nico Carstens and his Orchestra
- 1969 Columbia JSX(D) 11143, Die Beste van Nico Carstens, Nico Carstens and his Orchestra
- 1969 Columbia SCXJ 11145, Sounds Alright, Nico Carstens and his Orchestra with the Hennie Bekker Sound
- 1969 Columbia SCXJ 11147 (Reissued under MFP label), Danie Bosman – Liedjies en Wysies, Nico Carstens with Charles Doubell
- 1969 Columbia SCXJ(D)11157, Stadig Oor die Klippe, Al Debbo with Nico Carstens and his Orchestra
- 1969 Columbia SCXJ 11165, Nico se Boeredans, Nico Carstens with Adam Grobler
- 1969 Columbia SCXJ(D)11170, Die Beste van Nico Carstens Vol 2, Nico Carstens
- 1970 Columbia SCXJ 11180, Die Tantes van Nantes, Al Debbo with Nico Carstens
- 1970 Columbia SCJX 11183, SA '70, Nico Carstens and his Orchestra
- 1970 Columbia SCXJ 11188, Boere Brass, Nico Carstensfeaturing Robin Netcher
- 1970 Columbia SCXJ 11191, Vat Hom Dawie!, Adam Grobler with Nico Carstens

==== EMI ====
- 19?? EMI, Springbokke Bo!, Nico Carstens
- 1971 EMI, Party '’71, Nico Carstens
- 19?? EMI Uitspan RLF 1055, Konsertina Jol, Nico Carstens with Frikkie van Staten

==== His Master's Voice ====
- 19?? His Master's Voice, Die Skatkis van Afrikaanse Musiek (Compilation – First Afrikaans 10" record), Al Debbo with Nico Carstens

==== MFP ====
- 19?? MFP, Saterdagaand Party / Saturday Night Party, Nico Carstens
- 1983 MFP 57038, Carstens Cabernet, Nico Carstens
- 19?? MFP 58094, 20 Van die Beste, Nico Carstens
- 1971 MFP SRSJ 7042 (Reissued on EMI), Goue Plaat Vol 2, Nico Carstens
- 19?? MFP SRSJ 7081, Nico Carstens Se Goue Sterre, Nico Carstens
- 1976 MFP SRSJ 7091, By die Koffiehuis, Nico Carstens
- 1978 MFP SRSJ 8067, Dans! Dans! Dans!, Nico Carstens
- 1978 MFP SRSJ 8070, Nic en Nico, Nic Potgieter and Nico Carstens
- 1978 MFP SRSJ 8089, Zulu Warrior, Al Debbo with Nico Carstens
- 19?? MFP / Uitspan RLF 1040, So Dans die Boere, Nico Carstens with Frikkie van Staten

==== Nebula Bos records ====
- 2000 Boereqanga – Made in South Africa, Nico Carstens and Dave Ledbetter

==== Unknown Label ====
- 19?? 25 Grootste Treffers, Nico Carstens
- 19?? Die Kalfie Wals, Adam Grobler with Nico Carstens
- 19?? Kwela Carstens, Nico Carstens
- 19?? Oliekolonie, Nico Carstens
- 19?? Sounds Lekker, Nico Carstens with Dimpel Pretorius

== Cross Reference of Songs Performed by Nico Carstens ==
Song	Album
A Walk in the Black Forrest	Columbia 33JSX 11076
Aai Aai, die Witborskraai	Columbia 33JS 11002
Aan die Muur Hang Nou Sy Toom en Saal	Columbia 33JSX 11004, Columbia JSX 11138
Aandklokke	Columbia 33JSX 11003
Aandklokke Lui	MFP 57038
Aandlied van Kransdraai	Columbia SCJX 11183
Aasvoël Vastrap	Columbia 33JSX 11079
Adam se Boogie	Columbia SCXJ 11165
Adam se Drafstap	Columbia JSX 11088
Africa	Columbia 33JS 11006, Columbia 33JS 11011
Africa Go Go	Columbia JSX 11125
African Baion	Columbia 33JSX 11014, Columbia 33JSX 11057
African Stomp	Columbia JSX 11117, Columbia JSX 11124
Agtiensnaar Vastrap	Columbia JSX 11092
Ai Aia Wals	Columbia 33JSX 11075
Ain't She Sweet	Columbia 33JSX 11011
Aitsa	Columbia 33JSX 11066, EMI Uitspan RLF 1055
Akkordeon Skoffel	Columbia JSX 11082
Al Di La	Columbia 33JSX 11052
Al Jou Liefde Het Verdwyn	Columbia JSX 11092
Alibama	Columbia 33JSX 11031, Capitol of the World Series T10075 (Alabama)
All I Do is Dream of You	Columbia 33JSX 11011
All of Me	Columbia 33JSX 11011
All the Things You Are	Columbia 33JSX 11011
Alleen in die Skadu's	Columbia 33JS 11001
Almal Vrolik Nou	Uitspan RLF 1040
Alone Now	Columbia JSX 11125, Columbia SCXJ 11145, Columbia SCXJ 11180
An Dem Rhein	Columbia JSX 11082
Anita	Columbia JSX 11092
Anna My Skat	Columbia 33JS 11016
Annabella	Columbia JSX 11093
Apie Het Sy Stert Verloor	Columbia 33JSX 11038
Apiesrivier Polka	Columbia 33JSX 11066
Are You Lonesome Tonight	Columbia 33JSX 11011
As die Boereorkes Speel	Columbia SCXJ 11147
As die Jakaranda Bloei	Columbia 33JSX 11046
As die Maan Opkom oor die Berge	Columbia 33JSX 11079
As Jy Maar net kon Bemin	Columbia 33JSX 11073
At the Woodchoppers Ball	Columbia 33JSX 11057
Auntie With the Little Red Skirt	Capitol of the World Series T10075
Baan Breker Wals	Columbia 33JS 11012
Baas Jack	Columbia JSX 11124, Columbia JSX 11142
Babalaas	Columbia 33JSX 11034
Babanango	Columbia JSX 11089, Brigadiers BRIGL 2021
Baby Elephant Walk	Columbia 33JSX 11060
Baby Face	Columbia 33JSX 11011
Balke Seties	Columbia 33JSX 11031
Ballade van Eensaamheid	Brigadiers BRIGL 2021
Bars	Columbia 33JSX 11059
Be No More	Columbia JSX 11093
Beautiful Brown Eyes	Columbia 33JSX 11011
Bechuana Boy	Columbia 33JSX 11014
Beira Shake	Columbia JSX 11125
Bergrivier	Columbia SCXJ 11147
Bergstroompie	Columbia 33JSX 11075
Bergville Vastrap	Columbia 33JSX 11028
Berlyn Wals	Columbia 33JSX 11022
Betowering	Columbia 33JSX 11015, Columbia JSX(D) 11143, MFP SRSJ 7005, MFP SRSJ 7091
Bettie Babbelkous	Columbia SCXJ 11147
Biao Nico	Columbia SCXJ 11188
Biela-Biela Samba	Columbia JSX 11124, Columbia 33JS 11006, Columbia 33JSX 11034, Columbia JSX 11089
Bielie Balie Polka	Columbia 33JS 11001
Biem-Bam-Boem	Columbia 33JSX 11016
Blikaspaai	Columbia 33JS 11009, Columbia 33JSX 11034, Columbia 33JSX 11073, Columbia SCXJ(D) 11170
Bloedrivier Wals	Uitspan RLF 1040
Blonde Matroos	Columbia 33JSX 11008
Blou Donou	MFP SRSJ 7081
Blou Jakkals	Columbia JSX 11082
Blouberge	Columbia 33JSX 11031
Bloubergstrand	Columbia 33JS 11016
Bloumaanlig	Columbia JSX(D) 11143
Blouwildebees	Columbia 33JS 11001, Columbia JSX 11089
Blueberry Hill	Columbia 33JS 11007
Bobbejaan Klim die Berg	Columbia 33JS 11002, Capitol of The World Series T10075 (Old Baboon Climbs The Hill)
Bobbie Seties	Columbia 33JSX 11079
Boegoeberg se Dam	Columbia 33JS 11012, Columbia JSX 11091
Boegoeberg's Dream	Capitol of The World Series T10075
Boemelakka	Columbia 33JS 11016, Columbia 33JSX 11014
Boemetjieke-Boem-Tjiek	Columbia JSX 11082
Boere Ruk en Rol	Columbia 33JSX 11001
Boere Ruk-En-Pluk	Columbia 33JSX 11073
Boere-Ma-Tazz	Columbia SCJX 11183
Boerenooientjie	Columbia 33JSX 11008, Columbia JSX 11138
Boerepartytjie	Columbia 33JSX 11038
Boereseun	Columbia SCXJ 11147
Boerewors en Koffie	Columbia 33JSX 11038
Bokkie	Columbia JSX 11091
Boland Boogie	Columbia 33JS 11005
Boland Ruk en Rol	Columbia 33JSX 11001
Boland Seties	Columbia 33JSX 11075
Bolandse Nooientjie	Columbia 33JSX 11008, Columbia 33JSX 11063, MFP SRJS 7008
Bomvu Buhlalu	Columbia 33JSX 11014
Boomstraat	Capitol of The World Series T10075 (Tree Street)
Bootjie na Kammaland	MFP SRSJ 7081
Bossa Luna	Columbia 33JSX 11060
Bossa Nico	Columbia JSX 11082
Bossatina	Columbia 33JSX 11067
Bosveld Maan	Columbia 33JSX 11066
Bosveld Pondokkie	Columbia 33JSX 11001
Bosveld Seties	Columbia SCXJ 11165
Bruilof in die Veld	Columbia 33JSX 11016
Brush Those Tears From Your Eyes	Columbia 33JSX 11011
Buksie Wals	Columbia 33JSX 11028
Bung'low Bill	Columbia JSX 11135
Burger se Boogie	Columbia 33JSX 11076, Columbia JSX 11124
Butcher Bird	Columbia 33JS 11006
Buy a Donkey	Columbia SCXJ 11188
By die Koffiehuis	MFP SRSJ 7091
Calabash	Columbia JSX 11117
Call Me	Columbia JSX 11104
Canadian Sunset	Columbia 33JS 11007
Cape Coast	Columbia 33JSX 11014
Capri Eiland Cha-Cha	Columbia 33JSX 11022
Casa Nova	Columbia 33JSX 11076
Casablanca	Columbia 33JSX 11076, Columbia JSX 11135
Catherine	Columbia JSX 11117, Columbia JSX 11142, MFP SRSJ 8070
Catherine Cha Cha	Columbia 33JSX 11050
Catherine Tango	Columbia 33JS 11001
C'est Magnifique	Columbia 33JSX 11011
Cha Cha Petit	Columbia SCJX 11183, Columbia SCXJ 11188, Brigadiers BRIGL 2021
Charade	Columbia JSX 11104
Charlie My Boy	Columbia 33JSX 11011
Charmaine	Columbia 33JSX 11011
Chercher-Moi	Columbia JSX 11087
Chicken Kwela	Columbia JSX 11125, Columbia SCXJ 11145, MFP SRSJ 8067
Chippie	Columbia 33JSX 11076
Christina	MFP SRSJ 7091
Clap Clap Song	Hit City HC(A) 609
Clifton, Ek Kom	Columbia JSX 11094
Come Away Amandebele	Columbia 33JSX 11014
Come Back	Columbia 33JS 11006
Come to Me My Love	Columbia JSX 11093
Constantia Tango	Columbia 33JSX 11046
Corn Stalks	Capitol of the World Series T10075
Crazy Mixed Up Kid	Columbia 33JS 11007
Cruising	Columbia 33JS 11011
Cuban Love Song	Columbia 33JSX 11011
Daar bij die Molen	Columbia 33JSX 11008, Columbia JSX 11138
Daar Doer in die Bosveld	Columbia 33JSX 11003, Columbia 33JSX 11063, MFP SRJS 7008
Daar in die Vlei	Columbia 33JSX 11034
Daar Kom die Wa	Columbia 33JS 11002
Daar Lê die Ding	Columbia 33JS 11002
Daar Onder in die Kaap	Columbia SCXJ 11147
Daar's 'n Hoender	Columbia 33JS 11002, Capitol of the World Series T10075 (There's a Chicken that Can Never Lay An Egg)
Daar's 'n Wind Wat Waai	Columbia 33JS 11003, Columbia JSX 11089, Columbia JSX 11091, Capitol of the World Series T10075 (There's a Wind that Blows)
Daar's Geen Drome vir Jou (Tango)	Columbia 33JSX 11003
Dagbreek Seties	Columbia 33JSX 11001
Dagbreek Wals	Columbia 33JSX 11022
Danie Bosman Rapsodie	Columbia SCXJ 11147
Danke Schoen	Columbia 33JSX 11057
Dankie	Columbia SCJX 11183
Dans Klawers	Columbia SCXJ 11165
Dans! Dans! Dans!	MFP SRSJ 8067
David's Theme	Columbia 33JSX 11052
Delicado	Columbia 33JSX 11076
Deur Hom Geskep	Columbia 33JSX 11003
Die Apie Seties	Columbia 33JSX 11038 (Die Aap Seties), Columbia JSX 11088
Die Baas is Nou Ver	Columbia SCXJ 11165
Die Blonde Matroos	Columbia 33JSX 11063, MFP SRJS 7008
Die Boere Jol	Columbia 33JS 11012
Die Brander Vastrap	Columbia 33JSX 11028
Die Galop	Columbia 33JSX 11052
Die Goggabasaar	Columbia SCXJ 11180
Die Goue Tango	Columbia 33JSX 11001
Die Grenswag	MFP SRSJ 8070
Die Hedendaagse Lewe van Vandag	Columbia SCXJ 11180, MFP SRSJ 8089
Die Heideland	Columbia JSX 11138, Columbia 33JSX 11038
Die Hoender Is	Columbia JSX 11135
Die Kromhout Seties	Columbia 33JS 11016
Die Man van Mandini	EMI Uitspan RLF 1055
Die Moegoe-Seties	Columbia 33JS 11012, MFP SRSJ 7081 (Die Moegoe Setees)
Die Ossewa	Columbia 33JSX 11003, Columbia 33JSX 11021, Columbia 33JSX 11063, MFP SRJS 7008
Die Ou Kalahari	Columbia 33JSX 11008, Columbia 33JSX 11021, Columbia 33JSX 11050, Columbia 33JSX 11063, MFP SRJS 7008
Die Ou Kraalliedjie	Columbia JSX 11087
Die Padda Wou Gaan Opsit	Columbia JSX 11117
Die Ringetjie	Columbia 33JS 11009, Columbia 33JSX 11063, Columbia SCXJ(D) 11170, MFP SRJS 7008
Die Sakkie Sakkie Trein na Pretoria	MFP SRSJ 7042
Die Seewind Bring Heimwee	MFP SRSJ 8070
Die Spook	Columbia 33JSX 11059, Columbia JSX 11124
Die Spook van Dawid Rosekrans	Columbia 33JSX 11009
Die Stem	Columbia JSX 11138
Die Suikerrand Vastrap	Columbia 33JS 11001
Die Swaeltjie	Columbia 33JSX 11001, Columbia 33JSX 11015, Columbia JSX 11138, Columbia JSX(D) 11143, MFP SRSJ 7005
Die Swerwer Vastrap	Columbia 33JSX 11034
Die Tantes van Nantes	Columbia SCJX 11183, Columbia SCXJ 11180, Hit City HC(A) 609
Die Waenhuis Mazurka	Columbia 33JS 11012
Die Wals van Adam	Columbia JSX 11088
Die Wange van die Bobbejaan	Columbia SCXJ 11180, MFP SRSJ 8089 (Die Wange van 'n Bobbejaan)
Die Waterpan Drafstap	Columbia JSX 11091
Die Wêreld Deur	Columbia 33JSX 11003
Die Wolf Kwela	Columbia 33JSX 11067
Die Woudprinses	Columbia 33JS 11009, Columbia 33JSX 11063, Columbia SCXJ(D) 11170, MFP SRJS 7008
Dik Anna Seties	Columbia 33JSX 11021
Dis 'n Lekker, Lekker Lewe	Columbia 33JSX 11038
Dis My Kans	Columbia JSX 11093
Dis nie Myne nie	Columbia 33JS 11002
Dis Nou te Laat	Columbia 33JSX 11001
Do What You Do Do Well	Columbia 33JSX 11069
Dolores	Columbia 33JSX 11011
Donker Maan	Columbia 33JSX 11050, Columbia 33JSX 11060
Dorpsrivier	Columbia SCXJ 11165
Down in the Valley	Columbia 33JSX 11011
Driehoek Wals	Columbia 33JSX 11028
Drome	Columbia 33JSX 11004
Een Herrie Kerrie	Columbia 33JSX 11066, MFP SRSJ 8089
Eensame Paadjie	Columbia 33JSX 11008
Eighteen Yellow Roses	Columbia 33JSX 11055
Eiland van Verlange	Columbia 33JSX 11008, Columbia JSX 11138
Ek Het My Wens Gekry	Columbia 33JS 11009, Columbia SCXJ(D) 11170
Ek Hoor 'n Melodie	Columbia 33JSX 11008
Ek kan My Lag nie Hou nie	Columbia SCXJ 11180, MFP SRSJ 8089
Ek Kry die Piep	Columbia 33JSX 11001
Ek Noem dit 'n Wonderwerk	Columbia 33JSX 11016
Ek Ry met die Trein	His Master's Voice
Ek Verkies die Wapad	Columbia SCXJ 11147
Ek Verlang na Jou	Columbia 33JSX 11001, MFP SRSJ 7091
Ek's Lief vir Jou	Brigadiers BRIGL 2021
Elrina Wals	MFP 57038
Erika	Columbia 33JS 11009, Columbia 33JSX 11063, Columbia SCXJ(D) 11170, MFP SRJS 7008
Eva se Kwela	Columbia 33JSX 11079
Expo Jol	Columbia JSX 11082, EMI Uitspan RLF 1055, Hit City HC(A) 609, MFP SRSJ 7081, MFP SRSJ 8070
Faithful Hussar	MFP SRSJ 8070
Fanagalo	Columbia SSA 218, Columbia 33JS 11011
Fanie se Vastrap	Columbia 33JSX 11073
Fluister Wals	Columbia 33JS 11005
Fluit-Fluit	Columbia 33JS 11003
Fluitjie Kwela	MFP SRSJ 7081
Fluitjie Vastrap	Columbia 33JS 11003
Forever and Ever	Columbia 33JSX 11011
Francina	Columbia 33JSX 11004
Frikkie se Blikkie	EMI Uitspan RLF 1055
Frikkie se Drafstap	Columbia JSX 11091
Frikkie se Vastrap	Columbia 33JSX 11044, EMI Uitspan RLF 1055
From a Jack to a King	Columbia 33JSX 11055
Fuzz Trap	Hit City HC(A) 609
Galapolka	Columbia JSX(D) 11143
Geenfonteinse Vastrap	Columbia SCJX 11183
Gertjie is die Bruid	Columbia SCXJ 11147
Gesondheid	Columbia 33JS 11016, Columbia 33JSX 11079
Getroue Kamerade	Columbia 33JSX 11016, Columbia 33JSX 11063, MFP SRJS 7008
Gister se Herinnerings	Columbia SCXJ 11191
Gisternag se Droom	Columbia 33JSX 11079
Glimlaggies	Uitspan RLF 1040
Glo Dit of Glo Dit Nie	Columbia 33JSX 11001
God Seën Jou	Columbia 33JSX 11016
Goeienag	Columbia SCXJ 11147
Golden City Blues	Hit City HC(A) 609
Good Heavens, Mrs Evans	Columbia 33JSX 11059
Goody Goody	Columbia 33JSX 11011
Gou, Gou, Gou	Columbia 33JS 11004
Goue Vingers	Columbia 33JSX 11030, Columbia 33JSX 11057 (Golden Fingers), Columbia 33JSX 11066, Hit City HC(A) 609
Goueklawer Wals	Columbia JSX 11082
Grammadoelas	Columbia SCXJ 11180, MFP SRSJ 8067 (Gramadoelas)
Grandma Dooley	Columbia SCXJ 11145, Columbia SCJX 11183 (Granma Dooley), Columbia SCXJ 11188 (Granma Dooley)
Green are the Hills of Natal	Columbia SCJX 11183
Green Door	Columbia 33JS 11007
Green Fields	Columbia 33JSX 11055
Groen Koringlande	Columbia SCXJ 11191
Grootlawaai	Columbia 33JSX 11044
Gryspad Vastrap	Columbia 33JSX 11022
Guitar Twist	Columbia 33JSX 11052
Hamba Kahle	Columbia 33JS 11011
Hansie se Hanswors	Columbia 33JSX 11079
Hanswors	Columbia 33JSX 11009
Hart en Siel	Columbia 33JSX 11001
Hartseerwals	Columbia JSX(D) 11143, MFP SRSJ 8070
Hasie	Columbia 33JSX 11059, Columbia JSX 11124, His Master's Voice, MFP SRSJ 8067
Hasie in die Bossie	Columbia 33JSX 11050
Heen-en-Weer na Mooifontein	Columbia 33JSX 11030
Heideland	Columbia JSX 11138
Helena Cha Cha	Columbia 33JSX 11050, Columbia JSX 11117, Columbia JSX 11142
Helena Tango	Columbia 33JS 11001, Hit City HC(A) 609, MFP SRSJ 7081
Hello Dolly	Columbia 33JSX 11060
Herd Boy	Columbia JSX 11125, Columbia JSX 11142, MFP 57038
Here am I	Capitol of the World Series T10075
Here Goes!	Columbia 33JS 11006
Herfsblare	Columbia 33JSX 11075
Hessie se Witperd	Columbia SCXJ 11191
Hey Jealous Lover	Columbia 33JS 11007
Hier's Ek Weer	Columbia 33JS 11002, Columbia 33JS 11012
Hier's Ons Weer	Columbia SCXJ 11191
Hik-Hik Vastrap	Columbia 33JS 11008, Columbia SCXJ 11165
Hoe Lank – Hoe Gou	Columbia 33JSX 11001
Hoe Lank – Hoe Lank	Columbia 33JSX 11003, Columbia 33JSX 11060
Hoe Later Hoe Kwater	Columbia 33JSX 11031
Hoe Ry die Boere	Columbia 33JS 11002
Hou Jou Roksak Toe	Columbia JSX 11089
Hou Jou Roksak Toe Vastrap	Columbia 33JS 11005
Hound Dog	Columbia 33JS 11007
Huisie in die Berge	Columbia 33JSX 11073
Hy en Sy	Columbia 33JSX 11030
Hy Sal Moet Gaan	Columbia 33JSX 11031
Hy-Ba-Ba-Rie-Bab	Columbia 33JSX 11034, Columbia 33JSX 11059, Columbia JSX 11124
Hy's nie Meer By die Huis	MFP SRSJ 8089
I Like It	Columbia 33JS 11011
I Walk the Line	Columbia 33JSX 11055
Iestamboel	Columbia 33JSX 11067
If You Go South	Columbia 33JSX 11014
I'm Here Again Mr Magistrate	Capitol of The World Series T10075
I'm Just Wild about Harry	Columbia 33JSX 11011
Impala	Columbia 33JSX 11030
Impi Zulu	Columbia SCXJ 11145, Columbia SCXJ 11180, Brigadiers BRIGL 2021, MFP 57038
In die Skadu van Ou Tafelberg	Columbia 33JS 11016, Columbia SCXJ 11147
In My Droomskuitjie	Columbia SCXJ 11147
In My Eensaamheid	Columbia 33JS 11003, Hit City HC(A) 609
In Swaziland	Columbia 33JSX 11014
In the Mood	Columbia 33JSX 11057, EMI Uitspan RLF 1055
In The Valley of the Whispering Reeds	Columbia 33JS 11006
Inamerata	Columbia 33JSX 11011
Isabel	Columbia 33JSX 11034
Jakkals Drafstap	Uitspan RLF 1040
Jampot Polka	Columbia 33JS 11004, Columbia 33JSX 11015, Columbia 33JSX 11079, Hit City HC(A) 609, MFP SRSJ 7005, MFP SRSJ 8067
Jan Pierewiet	Columbia 33JS 11002
January February March	Capitol of The World Series T10075
Japie Seties	Columbia 33JSX 11075
Joey se Wals	Columbia 33JSX 11022
Joh'burg Samba	Columbia 33JS 11005, Columbia 33JS 11011, Columbia 33JSX 11014, Columbia JSX 11092
Just One of Those Things	Columbia 33JS 11007
Just Strotting	Columbia JSX 11087
Jy Behoort aan My	Columbia 33JSX 11030
Jy Betower My	Columbia 33JSX 11003
Jy's My Lied	MFP 57038
Kaapse Baai	Columbia 33JSX 11069, Uitspan RLF 1040
Kaapse Draai	Columbia 33JS 11016, Columbia SCXJ 11147
Kaapse Jol	Columbia JSX 11094
Kaapse Vastrap	Columbia JSX 11094
Kaatjie van die Baan	Columbia 33JS 11016
Kafeetjie om die Hoek	Columbia 33JS 11001
Kaia	Brigadiers BRIGL 2021
Kalahari Drafstap	Columbia 33JSX 11075
Kalahari Ferrari	MFP SRSJ 7042
Kalbas	Columbia 33JSX 11030
Kalfiewals	Columbia SCXJ 11165, MFP SRSJ 7042, MFP SRSJ 8089
Kannieklanie	Columbia SCJX 11183, MFP SRSJ 7042
Kapieniestraat	Columbia 33JSX 11057
Kariba	Columbia 33JSX 11066
Karoo Polka	Columbia SCXJ 11188
Katjiepiering Wals	Columbia 33JSX 11069
Keetmans Kwela	Columbia 33JSX 11057
Kerrie Boogie	MFP SRSJ 7091
Kersvet en Konfetti	Columbia 33JSX 11073, MFP SRSJ 8089 (Kersvet en Konfettie)
Keurboom Kwela	Columbia JSX 11094
Kierie Bielie	Columbia 33JS 11008, Columbia 33JSX 11073
Kietaar Kielie	Columbia 33JSX 11067
Kitaar Boogie	Columbia 33JSX 11069, Columbia JSX(D) 11143
Kitaar Kwela	Columbia JSX 11091
Kitaar Tjiekelei	Columbia JSX 11092
Klein Witte Duif	MFP SRSJ 7091
Klipdrif Vastrap	Columbia 33JS 11008
Klipkap Seties	Columbia 33JSX 11069
Kliprivier Polka	Columbia 33JSX 11022
Klokkiewals	Columbia 33JS 11003, Columbia 33JSX 11004, Columbia 33JSX 11015, Columbia 33JSX 11066, Columbia JSX(D) 11143, MFP SRSJ 7005
Knock, Knock Samba	Columbia 33JS 11006
Knorwals	MFP SRSJ 8070
Koekmakranka Brandewyn	MFP SRSJ 8089
Koffiehuis Drafstap	Brigadiers BRIGL 2021
Koffiehuis Vastrap	Columbia 33JS 11003
Kom na My	MFP SRSJ 7081
Kommando Polka	Columbia 33JSX 11031
Konsertina Boogie	Columbia 33JSX 11066
Konsertina en Banjo	Columbia 33JS 11008
Konsertina Jol	EMI Uitspan RLF 1055
Konsertina Kwela	Columbia 33JSX 11022, Columbia 33JSX 11066
Koos van der Merwe	Columbia JSX 11142
Koot se Kwela	Columbia 33JSX 11075
Kootjie Emmer	MFP SRSJ 8067
Koppie Alleen	Columbia 33JSX 11016
Koringland Boogie	Columbia 33JSX 11028, EMI Uitspan RLF 1055
Kougom Boogie	Columbia 33JSX 11028
Kransdraai	Columbia SCXJ 11191
Krokodil Boogie	Columbia JSX 11088
Krulkop Seties	Columbia 33JS 11016
Kuiken Kwela	Columbia 33JSX 11067, Columbia JSX 11082, Columbia JSX 11124, Columbia SCXJ 11180, EMI Uitspan RLF 1055
Kunene	MFP 57038
Kwela Mandini	Columbia JSX 11091
La Paloma	Columbia JSX 11087, Columbia JSX 11135, Columbia 33JSX 11016 (Verlief – La Paloma)
Laat God Vir Jou Lei	Columbia 33JS 11009, Columbia SCXJ(D) 11170
Ladysmith Vastrap	Columbia 33JSX 11044
Laerveld Vastrap	Columbia 33JSX 11031
Laggende Vonkelende Oë	Columbia JSX 11091, Hit City HC(A) 609 (Laggende, Vonk'lende Oë)
Langpad Wals	Columbia 33JSX 11028, EMI Uitspan RLF 1055
Langs die Wapad	Columbia 33JSX 11031
Laughing Sparkling Eyes	Columbia JSX 11104
Lay Down Your Arms	Columbia 33JS 11007
Lazy Kwêla	Columbia 33JS 11007
Lazy Limpopo	Columbia 33JSX 11014
Leeu Leeu	Columbia 33JSX 11014 (Lion Lion), Columbia 33JSX 11076
Leeubekkie	Columbia 33JSX 11044
Lekkerdraai Wals	Columbia 33JSX 11028
Lente in die Ou Transvaal	Columbia 33JSX 11046, Columbia SCXJ 11147
Lente in Switzerland	Columbia 33JSX 11050, Columbia JSX 11117, Columbia JSX 11142
Leopard Walk	Columbia JSX 11125
Letitia	Columbia JSX 11094
Let's Call It a Day	Columbia JSX 11093
Lettie se Wals	Columbia 33JS 11005, Capitol of The World Series T10075 (Lettie's Waltz)
Lewenslank	Columbia 33JSX 11004
Liebestraum Skoffel	Columbia JSX 11089
Liefdesgeluk	Columbia 33JSX 11004
Liefling	Columbia 33JSX 11008
Liefling, kom Wals saam met My	Columbia SCJX 11183
Liefste Madelein	Columbia SCJX 11183, MFP SRSJ 7042
Limpopo	Columbia 33JS 11001, Columbia JSX 11087
Little Dove of Napoli	Columbia SCJX 11183, MFP SRSJ 7042
Loch Vaal Vastrap	Columbia SCXJ 11191
Long Ago and Far Away	Columbia 33JSX 11011
Look for the Silver Lining	Columbia 33JSX 11011
Loura	MFP SRSJ 8067
Love is a Beautiful Song	Columbia SCJX 11183
Love is a Many Splendored Thing	Columbia 33JSX 11011
Luanda	Columbia JSX 11125, Columbia JSX 11135
Lucille	MFP SRSJ 8070
Lus om te Lewe	Columbia 33JS 11001
Ma Kom Kyk vir Lena	Columbia 33JS 11008, Columbia 33JSX 11021, MFP SRSJ 7081
Maandruppel	Columbia SCXJ 11165
Maanligwals	Columbia 33JSX 11031
Maan-Toe	Columbia SCXJ 11180
Madelein	Columbia JSX(D) 11143
Madeliefie	Columbia 33JSX 11044
Makalani	Columbia 33JSX 11075
Malawi Shuffle	Columbia JSX 11125
Mallemeule	Columbia 33JSX 11067, Columbia JSX 11089, Brigadiers BRIGL 2021, EMI Uitspan RLF 1055
Mama Teach Me To Dance	Columbia 33JS 11007
Mamma	Columbia JSX 11138
Man and a Woman	Columbia JSX 11104
Mangwane Mpulele	Columbia JSX 11117
Margate Tango	Columbia 33JSX 11046
Margie	Columbia 33JSX 11011, Columbia 33JSX 11030
Marianne	Brigadiers BRIGL 2021
Marie	Columbia 33JSX 11004, Columbia 33JSX 11030, Columbia 33JSX 11073
Marlene	Brigadiers BRIGL 2021
Maroela	Columbia 33JSX 11022
Mashubela	Columbia 33JSX 11069
Master Jack	Columbia JSX 11117
Matubatuba Tango	Columbia 33JSX 11044
Mayfair Samba	Columbia 33JSX 11014, Columbia 33JSX 11050
Me	Columbia 33JSX 11011
Meadowlands	Columbia 33JSX 11057, Columbia 33JSX 11069, Columbia JSX 11117
Meerkat Samba	Columbia 33JS 11001, Columbia 33JSX 11073
Meisie van My Drome	Columbia 33JSX 11034
Melancholy Baby	Columbia 33JSX 11011
Melody in F	Columbia JSX 11104
Met Net 'n Bietjie Liefde	MFP SRSJ 8067
Mielieblare Seties	Columbia 33JS 11005
Mieliepap	Columbia 33JSX 11076, Columbia JSX 11135, MFP 57038
Mimosa Cha-Cha	Columbia 33JSX 11059
Mocking Bird Song	Columbia 33JSX 11069
Mona Lisa	Columbia 33JSX 11011
Mooi Nooi Seties	Columbia SCXJ 11165
Mooiste Meisie	MFP SRSJ 7091
Moon River	Columbia 33JSX 11052
Moskou	Columbia 33JSX 11067
Mossie se Moses	Columbia 33JS 11016, Columbia 33JSX 11038, Columbia 33JSX 11076
Moyana	Columbia 33JSX 11030
Mozart se Wiegelied	Columbia 33JSX 11008
Music to Watch Girls By	Columbia JSX 11104
My Anna	Columbia SCXJ 11145
My Banjo en Ek	Columbia 33JS 11004
My Blinde Hart	Columbia 33JSX 11004
My Boerenooi	Columbia 33JSX 11003, Columbia 33JSX 11063, MFP SRJS 7008
My Bromponie	Columbia 33JSX 11016
My Droomwals	Columbia JSX 11091
My Gebroke Hart	Columbia 33JSX 11067
My Happiness	Columbia 33JSX 11011
My Hart Verlang na die Boland	Columbia JSX 11138
My Hartedief	Columbia 33JSX 11003, Columbia 33JSX 11063, Columbia JSX(D) 11143, MFP SRJS 7008
My Heimweë	Columbia JSX 11092
My Liefdeslied	Columbia 33JSX 11001
My Ma se Mak Makou	Columbia 33JSX 11067
My Opgewonde Hart	Columbia 33JSX 11003
My Prikkel Poppie	Columbia 33JS 11008
My Rita	Columbia 33JSX 11003
My Skat	Columbia SCXJ 11147
My Tee-La-Lee	Columbia 33JS 11006
'N Bietjie te Jonk	MFP SRSJ 7081
'n Moeder so Lieflik soos Jy	Columbia 33JSX 11008
Na aan My Hart	Columbia 33JS 11001, Uitspan RLF 1040
Naboom Vastrap	Columbia 33JSX 11031
Nakkie se Seties	Columbia 33JS 11012
Neef Frans se Polka	Columbia 33JS 11012, Columbia 33JSX 11066, Columbia JSX 11088
Net 'n Stille Uurtjie	Columbia 33JSX 11008, Columbia JSX 11138, Columbia SCXJ 11147
Net Jy Alleen	MFP SRSJ 8067
Net Nou en Dan	Columbia JSX 11087, Columbia JSX 11142
Nic en Nico se Vastrap	MFP SRSJ 8070
Nic se Boogie	MFP SRSJ 8070
Nico en Adam se Vastrap	Columbia JSX 11088
Nico en Frikkie se Vastrap	Columbia 33JSX 11044
Nico se Seties	Columbia JSX 11088
Nico se Wysie	Brigadiers BRIGL 2021, Hit City HC(A) 609, MFP 57038
Nicolise	Columbia 33JS 11001, Columbia 33JSX 11004
No Other Love	Columbia 33JS 11007
Noordewind Wals	Columbia JSX 11094
O, My Ma	Columbia 33JSX 11052
Oliekolonie	Columbia JSX 11104
One Day at a Time	MFP SRSJ 7091
One Hurry Curry	Columbia JSX 11124
Ons Anker Hier	Columbia 33JS 11012, Columbia JSX 11088
Ons Eerste Wals	Columbia SCXJ 11191
Ons Eie Suid Afrika	Columbia 33JSX 11016
Oom Bossie van die Bosveld	Columbia SCXJ 11147
Oom Charlie	Columbia 33JS 11004
Oom Frikkie se Tannie	Columbia JSX 11091
Oom Hans se Gemmerdans	Columbia DE 315
Oom Hendrik se Vastrap	Columbia JSX 11088
Oom Louw se Polka	Columbia 33JS 11016 (Oom Lou se Polka), Columbia 33JSX 11075, Columbia 33JSX 11079
Op 'n Braaivleisaand	Columbia SCXJ 11147
Op Toer	Columbia 33JSX 11079
Oslo Wals	Columbia 33JS 11016, Columbia JSX 11093 (Die Oslo Wals)
Ou Musikant	Columbia SCXJ 11147
Oubaas Kwela	MFP SRSJ 7091
Oujaar	Columbia 33JSX 11060
Ouma Lisa	Columbia JSX 11135, Columbia JSX 11142
Outa in die Langpad	Columbia 33JSX 11015, Columbia 33JSX 11069, Columbia JSX 11092, Columbia JSX(D) 11143, Columbia SCXJ 11188, MFP SRSJ 7005
Outydse Boere Seties	Columbia 33JS 11008
Outydse Duitse Wals	Columbia 33JS 11008
Outydse Kwadril	Columbia JSX 11088
Paadjie Oor die Rant	Columbia 33JSX 11016
Paddavlei Vastrap	Columbia 33JS 11008
Padlangs	Columbia 33JSX 11075
Pambielie	Columbia 33JS 11003
Pap en Pampoen	Columbia 33JSX 11044
Papegaaidraai	Columbia 33JSX 11044
Papwiel Vastrap	Columbia 33JSX 11028
Parrasien	Columbia JSX 11082
Peg O My Heart	Columbia 33JSX 11011
Penny Whistle Kwela	Columbia JSX 11089
Pêrel Toe na My Kêrel Toe	Columbia 33JSX 11046, Columbia 33JSX 11060
Perskes en Room	Columbia 33JSX 11001
Pinetops Boogie	Columbia 33JSX 11057
Piove	Columbia 33JSX 11011
Platvoet Wals	Columbia 33JSX 11044
Poetoe Pap	Columbia 33JSX 11022
Poljas Polka	Columbia JSX 11087
Polka Dot Polka	MFP SRSJ 7042
Pollie Ons Gaan Pêrel Toe	Columbia 33JS 11002
Pondoland	Columbia 33JS 11011, Columbia 33JSX 11014, Columbia 33JSX 11046
Potties en Billies	MFP SRSJ 8070
Pretty Meraaia	MFP SRSJ 8089
Puppet on a String	Columbia JSX 11104, Columbia JSX 11124
Purdy Waltz	MFP SRSJ 8067
Quando Quando	Columbia 33JSX 11052
Quantanamera	Columbia SCXJ 11145
Raakvat	Columbia 33JSX 11057
Rainbow Under My Hat	MFP SRSJ 7042
Ramaja	MFP SRSJ 7091
Rapsodie	Columbia 33JSX 11016
Resiesbaan Seties	Columbia 33JS 11004
Ressano Garcia	MFP SRSJ 7081
Reza	Columbia SCXJ 11145
Rhapsody	Columbia 33JS 11006
Richardsbaai Wals	EMI Uitspan RLF 1055
Ricky-Ticky-Ticky-Tick	Columbia JSX 11092
Rock Around The Clock	Columbia 33JS 11007
Rooijakkals Seties	Columbia 33JSX 11022, Columbia 33JSX 11052
Roosterbrood	Columbia 33JSX 11075
Roses are Red	Columbia 33JSX 11055
Rosie van die Bosveld	Columbia 33JSX 11052
Route	Columbia 33JSX 11060
Roy se Vastrap	Columbia 33JSX 11060
Rul-En-Rol Seties	Columbia 33JSX 11044
Saai uit die Goeie Nuus	Columbia 33JSX 11004
Saal en Toom Ruk en Rol	Columbia 33JSX 11031
Saam in My Drome	Columbia 33JSX 11067
Sadie's Shawl	Columbia 33JS 11006, Columbia 33JSX 11050, Columbia JSX 11125 (Shadie's Shawl), Columbia SCXJ 11188
Safari Skoffel	Columbia JSX 11087
Saggies Klink so 'n Melodie	Columbia 33JSX 11008
Sakkie se Settees	Columbia 33JS 11001
Sakkie se Vastrap	Columbia 33JS 11012
Samba Luna	Columbia 33JSX 11050, Columbia SCXJ 11145
Sampie	MFP SRSJ 8070
San Antonio Rose	Columbia 33JSX 11055
Sandpad Seties	Columbia 33JS 11003
Sannieshof Settees	Columbia 33JS 11001
Sarie Marais	Columbia 33JS 11002, Columbia JSX 11093
Sarie Marais Vastrap	Columbia 33JS 11005
Sawends	Columbia 33JSX 11001, Columbia JSX(D) 11143
Seën die Huis	Columbia 33JSX 11003
Shannon Wals	Columbia 33JSX 11052
Shanty in Old Shanty Town	Columbia 33JSX 11011
She is Not For Me	Capitol of The World Series T10075
She Taught Me How to Yodel	Columbia JSX 11089
Shirley Wals	Columbia 33JS 11004
Side By Side	Columbia 33JSX 11011
Sikkedoema	Columbia JSX 11135, Columbia JSX 11142
Silvia	Columbia 33JSX 11066
Silwer Hare Tussen Goud	Columbia JSX(D) 11143
Silwer Maan Oor Goue Vlaktes	Columbia 33JSX 11066
Silwerklawer Seties	Columbia JSX 11094
Sing 'n Liefdesliedjie	Columbia 33JSX 11016
Sioux City Sue	Columbia 33JSX 11034
Sirkus Polka	Columbia JSX 11082, Columbia JSX 11092
Skaam vir Jou	Columbia 33JSX 11004
Skattebol	MFP SRSJ 8067
Skemer	Uitspan RLF 1040
Skemer Tango	Columbia 33JSX 11004
Skemer Uurtjie	Columbia SCXJ 11147
Skemerliedjie	MFP 57038
Skenk My Jou Liefde	Columbia 33JSX 11001
Skilpad Kwela	Columbia JSX 11094
Skoffel Seties	Uitspan RLF 1040
Skokiaan	Columbia SCXJ 11188
Skoolbus Drafstap	Columbia JSX 11094
Skoonspruit Seties	Columbia 33JSX 11022, Columbia 33JSX 11046
Skop, Skiet en Skededdel	Columbia 33JSX 11059, Uitspan RLF 1040
Skoppelmaai	Columbia 33JS 11003, Columbia 33JS 11016, Columbia 33JSX 11066
Skotse Vastrap	Columbia 33JSX 11052
Skud en Wikkel Kwela	Columbia 33JS 11009, Columbia SCXJ(D) 11170
Skud Hom!	Columbia SCXJ 11191
Slimpraatjies	Columbia 33JSX 11001, Columbia 33JSX 11073
So Alleen	Brigadiers BRIGL 2021
So Far Away	Columbia JSX 11117
So Wonderful	Columbia 33JSX 11011
Soetpatatta	Columbia SCXJ 11188
Some of These Days	Columbia 33JSX 11011
Someday	Columbia 33JSX 11011
Somersdrome	Columbia 33JSX 11075
Sometimes	Columbia SCXJ 11145
Somewhere I'll Find You	Columbia 33JSX 11059
Sonbesie Vastrap	Columbia 33JS 11008
Sonbrilletjies	Columbia JSX 11135, Columbia JSX 11142
Sonder Jou	MFP SRSJ 7091
Sonop	Columbia 33JSX 11052
Soul Coaxing	Columbia SCXJ 11145
Sousboontjies	Columbia 33JSX 11038, Columbia 33JSX 11059
South West Samba	Columbia JSX 11125
Soutpansbergse Polka	Columbia 33JS 11004
Spaane Nooi	Columbia JSX 11117
Spaanse Baion	Columbia JSX 11089
Spanish Eyes	Columbia JSX 11087, Columbia JSX 11135
Spanish Flea	Columbia 33JSX 11076
Spanish Fly	Columbia JSX 11104
Spantou Polka	Columbia 33JSX 11028
Springbok Polka	Columbia 33JSX 11001, Columbia SCXJ 11165
Springboklied	Columbia 33JSX 11038
Stokkiesdraai	Columbia SCXJ 11191
Stoppeldraai Vastrap	Columbia JSX 11094
Stoppelland	Columbia 33JSX 11030, Columbia JSX 11092
Stoppie	Columbia JSX 11089, Columbia JSX 11093
Striped Onions	Columbia SCXJ 11188
Stywe Lyne	Columbia 33JSX 11069
Sucu-Sucu	Columbia 33JSX 11052
Sugar Doll Barn Dance	Capitol of the World Series T10075
Suidwesvastrap	MFP SRSJ 7081
Suikerbos Cha-Cha	Columbia 33JSX 11022
Suikerbossie	Columbia 33JS 11002, Columbia JSX 11093, Capitol of the World Series T10075 (Sugarbush)
Suikerrandvastrap	Columbia JSX(D) 11143
Summertime in Paris	Columbia JSX 11087
Susan Jane	Capitol of the World Series T10075
Susie	Columbia 33JSX 11038
Suurberg Vastrap	Columbia JSX 11088
Swartkraai	Columbia 33JSX 11067
Swazi Girl	Columbia JSX 11125, Columbia JSX 11135, Columbia JSX 11142, MFP SRSJ 7042
Sweet Corazan	MFP SRSJ 7091
Swippi	Columbia 33JSX 11034
Swiss Lullaby	Columbia 33JSX 11034
Taaibossie Nova	Columbia JSX 11094
Tafelbaai	Columbia 33JS 11001
Tahiti	Columbia 33JSX 11063, Columbia JSX(D) 11143, MFP SRJS 7008
Tahiti, Verre Land	Columbia 33JS 11009, Columbia SCXJ(D) 11170
Tamatiesous en Kerriekos	Columbia JSX 11135
Tammy	Columbia 33JSX 11004, Columbia 33JSX 11011, Columbia JSX 11138
Tango Simfonie	Columbia 33JSX 11016
Tant Mina Kook Stroop	Columbia 33JS 11002
Tant San van Christiana	Columbia 33JSX 11021
Tarrel-La-Da	Columbia JSX 11082
Tears	Columbia JSX 11087
Teddiebeer – Teddy Bear	MFP SRSJ 7081
The Happy Whistler	Columbia 33JS 11007
The Joke's on Me	Columbia SCXJ 11145
The One I Love	Columbia 33JSX 11011
The Sweet Life	Columbia JSX 11104
The Wayward Wind	Columbia 33JSX 11055
Then You Came	Columbia 33JSX 11059
They Say that Falling in Love is Wonderful	Columbia 33JSX 11011
Those Were the Days	Columbia SCXJ 11145
Tick-Tock Polka	Columbia 33JS 11011
Tiekie Vastrap	Columbia 33JSX 11028
Timothy	Columbia JSX 11117
Toe Sê My Nou	Columbia 33JSX 11004
Totsiens Tot Wederom	Columbia 33JSX 11050
Toutrek Seties	Columbia 33JSX 11028
Towerland(Tango)	Columbia 33JSX 11003
Trap en Trippel	Columbia 33JSX 11069, Columbia JSX(D) 11143
Treksaag Vastrap	Columbia 33JS 11004
True Love	Columbia 33JS 11007, Columbia 33JSX 11011
Tugela Kwela	Uitspan RLF 1040
Tuis Op die Plaas	Columbia 33JSX 11031
Twaalfsnaar Vastrap	Uitspan RLF 1040
Twee-Kitaar Vastrap	Columbia JSX 11092
Twelve Roses	Columbia 33JSX 11076
Twiststraat	Columbia SCXJ 11191
Two Tears	Columbia 33JS 11006
Uit die Outyd	Columbia 33JSX 11073
Uitkyk Wals	Columbia SCXJ 11165
Uitstap Vastrap	Columbia JSX 11088
Umfaan	Columbia 33JSX 11038, Columbia 33JSX 11060
Under an African Sky	Columbia 33JSX 11014
Vaaldam Seties	Columbia 33JSX 11021
Vakansie in Venesië	Columbia 33JSX 11016
Valley of a Thousand Hills	Columbia JSX 11104
Vanaand Gaan die Volkies Koring Sny	Columbia 33JS 11002, Capitol of the World Series T10075 (Tonight We Will Go to Cut the Corn)
Vanaand is Myne	Columbia 33JS 11003, Columbia 33JSX 11030
Vastrap Saldana	Columbia SCXJ 11165
Vat Hom Dawie!	Columbia SCXJ 11191
Vat Jou Goed en Trek	Columbia 33JS 11002, Capitol of the World Series T10075 (Take Your Things and Go Ferreira)
Ver in die Wêreld Kittie	Columbia 33JS 11002
Ver Loop Kwela	Columbia JSX 11089
Ver Stap Vastrap	Columbia 33JS 11005
Verkyker Seties	Columbia 33JS 11005
Verlate op die Berge	Columbia 33JSX 11079
Verreland	Columbia 33JSX 11050
Vlooi Vlooi	Columbia 33JSX 11031, Columbia 33JSX 11059, Columbia JSX 11124
Voetpad	Columbia 33JSX 11079
Voom-Ba-Voom	Columbia 33JS 11011, Columbia 33JSX 11021, Columbia JSX(D) 11143, MFP 57038, MFP SRSJ 7042
Vosperd Polka	Columbia 33JS 11001
Vrolike Strauss Walsie	Columbia JSX 11087
Vrolike Vastrap	Columbia JSX 11094
Vrystaat	Columbia JSX 11142
Vuurvliegie Wals	Columbia 33JSX 11050
Waarom Het Jy My Verlaat	Uitspan RLF 1040
Waatlemoenpit Polka	Columbia JSX 11091
Walk Hand in Hand	Columbia 33JS 11007
Wals uit die Outyd	Columbia 33JS 11016
Warden Vastrap	Columbia 33JSX 11022
Warm Pampoen Seties	Columbia 33JSX 11031
Warm Patat	Columbia 33JSX 11021, Columbia 33JSX 11066, Columbia JSX(D) 11143, Columbia SCXJ 11188, Hit City HC(A) 609
Warm Snare	Columbia 33JSX 11067, Columbia JSX 11124
Wat Maak Oom Kalie Daar	Columbia 33JS 11002
Wat Makeer Jou Nou	Columbia SCXJ 11147
Water is Nat	Columbia SCJX 11183, Columbia SCXJ 11180, MFP SRSJ 7042, MFP SRSJ 8089
Waterpan Drafstap	Columbia 33JS 11004
Waterstroompie	Columbia 33JS 11008
Waterval Seties	Columbia 33JS 11008
Watsenaam	Columbia JSX 11093
Wawiel Vastrap	Columbia 33JSX 11044
Wednesday's Child	Columbia JSX 11104
Weeping Willow	Columbia 33JSX 11076, Columbia JSX 11082, Columbia SCXJ 11145, Columbia SCXJ 11180
Well, Whad' D' Ya Know	Columbia 33JS 11011
Westewindjie	Columbia 33JS 11003 (Westwindjie), Columbia 33JSX 11050
What a Fool I Am	Columbia 33JSX 11052
Whatever Will Be Will Be	Columbia 33JS 11007
Wheels	Columbia 33JSX 11057
When My Blue Moon Turns to Gold Again	Columbia 33JSX 11034
When Will I Fall in Love	Columbia 33JSX 11011
When You Were a Tulip	Columbia 33JSX 11011
When You're Smiling	Columbia 33JSX 11011
Where Have You Gone	Columbia JSX 11093
Wie Het Jou So Wonderlik Gemaak	Columbia 33JSX 11001 (Wie't Jou So Wonderlik Gemaak), Columbia 33JS 11009, Columbia 33JSX 11063, Columbia SCXJ(D) 11170, MFP SRJS 7008
Wie is Bang vir Daardie Spook	Columbia JSX 11142
Willem, O! Willem	MFP SRSJ 8067
Wimoweh	Columbia JSX 11117, Columbia JSX 11142, MFP SRSJ 7081
Winterwals	Columbia 33JS 11004, MFP SRSJ 7042
Wipneusie	Columbia 33JSX 11001, Columbia 33JSX 11015, Columbia 33JSX 11073, Columbia JSX(D) 11143, Columbia SCXJ 11191, MFP SRSJ 7005
Witrivier Vastrap	Columbia 33JSX 11022
Wolf Kwela	Columbia JSX 11125
Wondersoet	Columbia 33JSX 11050
Wooden Heart	Columbia 33JSX 11030
Yellow Bird	Columbia 33JSX 11060
You Belong to My Heart	Columbia 33JSX 11055
You Never Know	Columbia JSX 11092
Zambesi	Columbia 33JS 11006, Columbia 33JSX 11069, Columbia JSX(D) 11143, Columbia SCXJ 11188
Zeeman	MFP SRSJ 7081
Zulu Warrior	Capitol of The World Series T10075, MFP SRSJ 8089
Zulu Wikkel	Columbia JSX 11091

== Medley Cross Reference ==
Medley	Album
A Little on the Lonely Side; a Kiss to Build a Dream On; It's Been a Long Long Time	Columbia 33JSX 11006
Al die Veld is Vrolik; Lus om te Lewe; Al die Veld is Vrolik	Columbia 33JSX 11009
Anniversary Waltz; Diane; Carolina Moon	Columbia 33JSX 11006
Blou Maanlig; Sawends; Madelein	Columbia 33JSX 11021
Bloubergstrand; Waterpan Drafstap; Sy Kom van Kommetjie	Columbia 33JSX 11046
Blue Eyes Crying in the Rain; that Little Kid Sister of Mine; Have I Told You Lately that I Love You	Columbia 33JSX 11055
Bokkie; Stoppie	Columbia 33JSX 11009
Catherine Tango; Helene Tango	Columbia 33JSX 11015, MFP SRSJ 7005
Cheek to Cheek; Give Me Five Minutes More	Columbia 33JSX 11006
Chicago; I Can't Give You Anything But Love; Alexander's Ragtime Band	Columbia 33JSX 11060
Daar's 'n Hoender wat 'n Eier nie kan lê; Hier's Ek Weer; Daar's 'n Wind wat Waai	Columbia 33JSX 11002
Die Handvol Vere; Pale-Toe; Boegoeberg se Dam	Columbia 33JSX 11038
Die Kat en die Muis; die Blikkie se Boom Val Uit; Ma Kom Kyk vir Lena	MFP 57038
Die Kat en die Muis; Ma Kom Kyk vir Lena	Columbia 33JSX 11009
Die Lieflike Bolandse Wals; die Dierbare Moeder van My; in My Eensaamheid	MFP 57038
Die Ou Kalahari; Susanna van Saldana; Suid-Afrika Ons Land	Columbia 33JSX 11046
Die Stilte van die Kleinkaroo; By die Ou Meulstroom	Columbia 33JSX 11009
Dit is My Wens; Goue Tango	Columbia 33JSX 11021
Gala Polka; Suikerrand Vastrap	Columbia 33JSX 11015, MFP SRSJ 7005
Getrou aan Jou; Soos 'n Ster in die Nag; Bergrivier	Columbia 33JSX 11009
Goodnight Irene; Cruising Down the River	Columbia 33JSX 11055
Goodnight Sweetheart; I'll See You in My Dreams; Auld Lang Syne	Columbia 33JSX 11006
Greensleeves, Marcheta	Columbia 33JSX 11055
Hasie; Fanagalo; Riksja Booi	Columbia 33JSX 11015, MFP SRSJ 7005
Hou Jou Rokkies Bymekaar; Daar's 'n Wind wat Waai	Columbia 33JSX 11009
I Really Don't Want to Know; Laggende Vonk'lende Oë	Columbia 33JSX 11055
In My Droomskuitjie; Booitjie na Kamma Land	Columbia 33JSX 11009
Into Each Life Some Rain Must Fall; My Blue Heaven; At Sundowm	Columbia 33JSX 11006
It's the Irish in Me; Always; When Irish Eyes are Smiling	Columbia 33JSX 11006
Jingle Bells; Deep in the Heart of Texas; Heartaches	Columbia 33JSX 11006
Jy, Jy, Jy; Kom Dans Klaradyn	Columbia 33JSX 11009
Kappit Yt; Afrika; Tamatiesous en Kerriekos	Columbia 33JSX 11021
Kappit Yt; die Hoë Polvy; Tamatiesous en Kerriekos	Columbia 33JSX 11009
Klein Jan Skiet die Kat; Susanna van Saldanha	Columbia 33JSX 11009
Laat Ons Gaan; My Hart is in die Boland; Bloemfontein se Rose	Columbia 33JSX 11046
Lag, Sing en Dans; 'n Padda is 'n Ding wat Spring	Columbia 33JSX 11009
Limpopo; Blouwildebees	Columbia 33JSX 11015, MFP SRSJ 7005
Limpopo; Witrivier Vastrap; Graskop Polka	Columbia 33JSX 11046
Louis; Tangerine; Moonlight Bay	Columbia 33JSX 11006
Memories; in the Valley of the Moon; How Can You Buy Killarney	Columbia 33JSX 11006
My Hartedief; Hartseer Wals	Columbia 33JSX 11021
My Serenade; Capri Fischer (Bella Maria)	Columbia 33JSX 11021
On Top of Old Smokey; the Sea is Calling Me; On Top of Old Smokey	Columbia 33JSX 11055
One Hurry-Curry; Two Cold Cats and a Hot Dog	Columbia 33JSX 11059
Paddatjie; Riksja Booi; Hasie	Columbia 33JSX 11009
Perdeby; Bokkie	Columbia 33JS 11002
Platrand Seties; die Brakke van Turffontein	Columbia 33JSX 11015, MFP SRSJ 7005
Ruiter in die Nag; My Blinde Hart; Oor Veld en Vlaktes	Columbia 33JSX 11055
Saggies Klink so 'n Melodie; die Lieflike Bolandse Wals; Boereseun	Columbia 33JSX 11021
Sioux City Sue; Singin' in the Rain; You Were Meant for Me	Columbia 33JSX 11006
Skoppelmaai; Koffiehuisvastrap; Sirkus Polka	Columbia 33JSX 11015, MFP SRSJ 7005
Stellenbosch Verlange; Koppie Alleen	Columbia 33JSX 11046
Strauss-Keurspel	Columbia JSX 11093
Tafelbaai; Die Lieflike Bolandse Wals; Nag My Skat	Columbia 33JSX 11046
Tahiti; Silwer Hate Tussen Goud	Columbia 33JSX 11015, MFP SRSJ 7005
Tamatiesous en Kerriekos; die Manne van die Panne; Sikkedoema	MFP SRSJ 8089
Tant San van Christiana; Suikerrand Vastrap; Blikkiesdorp Vastrap	Columbia 33JSX 11046
Tulips From Amsterdam; Oh, What a Beautiful Morning	Columbia 33JSX 11006
We Three; White Christmas	Columbia 33JSX 11006
Zambesi; Santie se Kopdoek; Skokiaan	Columbia 33JSX 11015, MFP SRSJ 7005
