= Sten & Stanley =

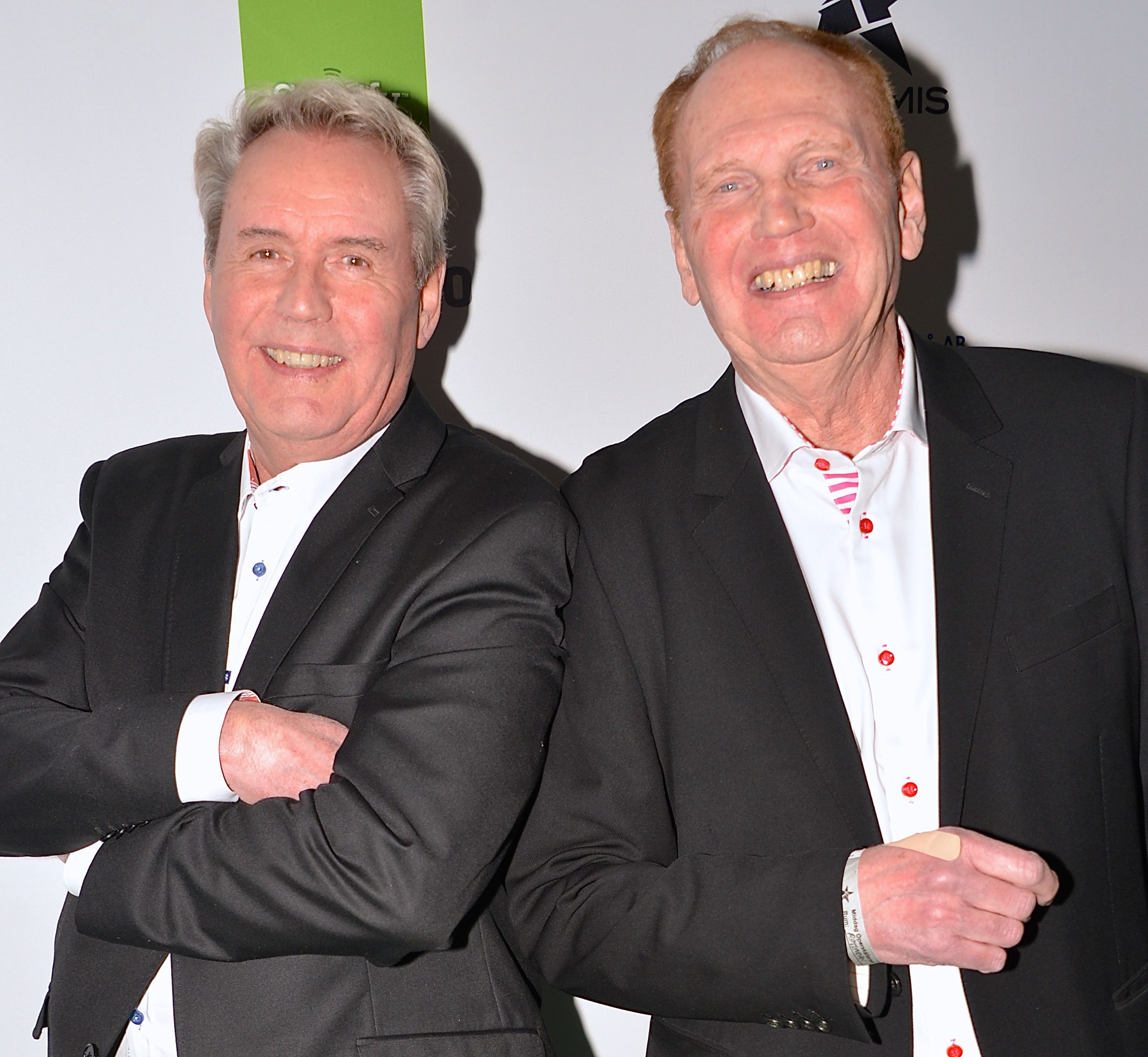

Background information
- Origin: Karlskoga, Sweden
- Genres: Dansband
- Years active: 1962–present
- Website: http://www.stenochstanley.se/

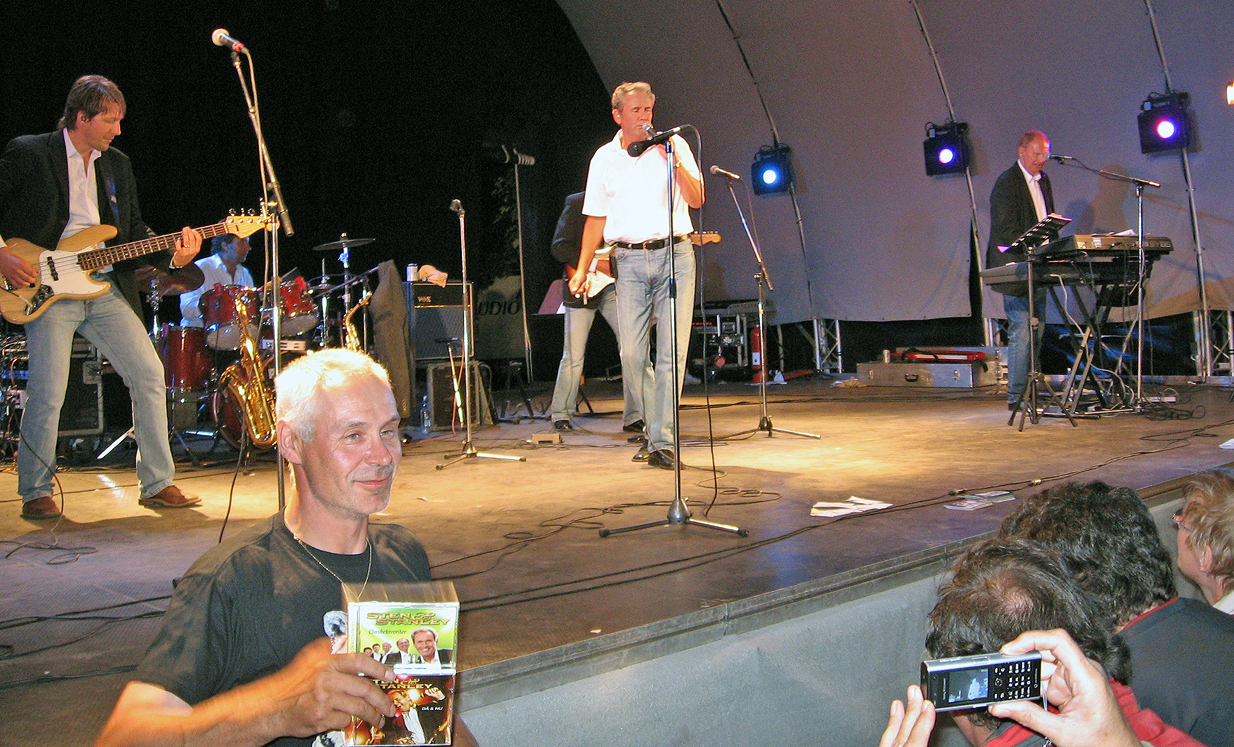
Sten & Stanley. Malmöfestivalen 2006.

Sten & Stanley are a dansband from Karlskoga, Sweden. Established in 1962, the band has scored several Svensktoppen hits, including their signature song "Jag vill vara din, Margareta". Their hit song "Dra dit pepparn växer" was translated into English and won the Castlebar Song Contest in 1985.

== Discography ==
- Guns of Bofors 1963
- I lust och nöd 1965
- Varsågod 1966
- Sten & Stanley's australisk sångbok 1967
- Röd var din mun 1967
- Sten Nilsson 1968
- Sten Nilsson & Sten & Stanleys kör och orkester 1969
- Sten & Stanley Sten Nilsson 1970
- A Touch of Sweden 1970
- Sten Nilsson nu 1971
- Kända låtar i stereo 1972
- Kända låtar i stereo 2 1973
- En god och glad jul 1973
- De' är dans 1974
- Sten & Stanleys bästa bitar 1975
- Bella Bella 1976
- Jambalaya 1977
- Sten Nilsson 1977
- Sten & Stanley's framsida 1977
- Copacabana 1979
- På gång 1980
- På gång 2 1982
- Adios Amor 1983
- Jag har inte tid 1984
- God jul 1984
- Musik, dans & party 1985
- Musik, dans & party 2 1986
- En god och glad jul 1986
- Musik, dans & party 3 1987
- Musik, dans & party 4 1988
- Minnets melodi. Sten & Stanley 1963-1989 1989
- Som ett ljus. Musik, dans & party 5 1990
- Dansparty Sten & Stanley 1991
- Dansparty Sten & Stanley 1991
- Musik, dans & party 6 1991
- Musik, dans & party 7 1992
- På begäran 1989
- Musik, dans & party 8 1993
- Musik, dans & party 9 1994
- Musik, dans & party 10 1995
- Julnatt 1995
- Musik, dans & party 11 1996
- Jag vill vara din, Margareta 1997
- San Diego. 35 år 20 hits 1997
- De tidiga åren 1998
- Bröder 1998
- Stjärnan lyser klar 2000
- Sten & Stanley framsida 2000 2000
- Du är min bästa vän 2001
- Om bara jag får 2001
- Musik, dans & party 94-96 2001
- 40/40 En samling 2002
- Samlade TV-hits 2003
- Sten & Stanley önskefavoriter 2004
- Sten & Stanley då & nu 2006
- Det känns när det svänger 2008
- Allsånger på vårt sätt2009
- Då kommer minnena 2011
- 50 Jubileum 1962-2012 2012
- Bugga med Sten & Stanley 2014
- Sten & Stanley Bästa! 2016
- Du öppnade din dörr 2016
