= Hot bird =

Hot Bird is a series of Eutelsat communications satellites.

Hot Bird or Hot Birds may also refer to:

- Eutelsat TV Awards, originally known as the Hot Bird TV Awards, an annual television awards, sponsored by Eutelsat.
- Mattel Hot Birds, die cast toy model airplane series from Mattel, a spin-off of Hot Wheels

== See also ==
- Bird (disambiguation)
- Hot (disambiguation)
- Redbird (disambiguation)
- Firebird (disambiguation)
- Chicken as food
