= Shotgun Singer =

Studio album by Kris Delmhorst
- Released: April 15, 2008
- Recorded: North Reading, MA
- Genre: Americana, Folk music
- Label: Signature Sounds
- Producer: Kris Delmhorst, Sam Kassirer

Kris Delmhorst chronology
Strange Conversation (2006)	Shotgun Singer (2008)

Shotgun Singer is an album by American singer/songwriter Kris Delmhorst, released in 2008.

== History ==
Delmhorst recorded Shotgun Singer in a rural cabin with minimal recording gear by herself. Once completed, she brought in various players to add to the songs, including her husband Jeffrey Foucault and friend and label-mate Peter Mulvey. Those three had previously released Redbird together five years earlier.

== Reception ==
Professional ratings
Review scores
Source	Rating
Allmusic	(no rating)

Joe Vigilione of Allmusic wrote "... anyone dipping into a song like "Freediver" or any other random track on this disc is bound to be quite surprised at the extraordinary depth inside."

The Boston Herald stated in their review: "Perennial Boston Music Award nominee Delmhorst makes a stunning transformation by moving from the countrified folk of her previous three releases to a dreamier and denser sound brimming with atmosphere and muted-but-infectious melodies... Shotgun Singer is a work of lo-fi beauty, and evidence of an artist taking flight."

== Track listing ==
All songs by Kris Delmhorst.

1. "Blue Adeline" – 4:28
2. "Heavens Hold the Sun" – 3:43
3. "To the Wire" – 4:02
4. "Midnight Ringer" – 4:13
5. "If Not for Love" – 3:27
6. "Riverwide" – 4:19
7. "1000 Reasons" – 4:33
8. "Birds of Belfast" – 4:57
9. "Oleander" – 3:05
10. "Kiss It Away" – 3:14
11. "Freediver" – 4:02
12. "Brand New Sound" – 3:26

== Personnel ==
- Kris Delmhorst – vocals, acoustic and electric guitar, organ, piano, cello, tambourine, mandolin, bass, vibraphone, keyboards, Fender Rhondes
- Jeffrey Foucault – acoustic guitar, banjo, slide guitar
- David "Goody" Goodrich – guitar loops
- Sam Kassirer – organ, piano, percussion, keyboards, vibraphone, Fender Rhodes
- Kimon Kirk - bass
- Makaya McCraven - drums
- Erin McKeown – requinto
- Peter Mulvey – electric guitar
- Barry Rothman - record samples, shortwave radio

== Production ==
- Produced by Kris Delmhorst and Sam Kassirer
- Engineered by Danny Bernini, Justin Pizzoferrato, Andy Pinkham and Sam Kassirer
- Mastered by Jeff Lipton
- Mixed by Kristen Smith
- Photography by Jon Strymish, Jeffrey Foucault and Kris Delmhorst
- Design by Paul Fucik
