= Horse latitudes (disambiguation) =

The horse latitudes are a geographical area north and south of the equator.

Horse Latitudes may also refer to:

- "Horse Latitudes", a song on the 1967 album Strange Days by the Doors
- Horse Latitudes, a 1975 television movie based on controversial yachtsman Donald Crowhurst
- The Horse Latitudes, a 1997 EP by the Promise Ring
- Horse Latitudes (poetry collection), a 2006 poetry collection by Paul Muldoon
- Horse Latitudes (album), a 2011 album by Jeffrey Foucault
