= Redbird (Redbird album) =

Studio album by Redbird
- Released: February 22, 2005
- Recorded: August 13–15, 2003
- Genre: Americana, folk
- Label: Signature Sounds

Redbird chronology
Redbird (2005)	Live at the Cafe Carpe (2011)

Kris Delmhorst chronology
Songs for a Hurricane (2003)	Redbird (2005)	Strange Conversation (2006)

Jeffrey Foucault chronology
Stripping Cane (2004)	Redbird (2005)	Ghost Repeater (2006)

Peter Mulvey chronology
Kitchen Radio (2004)	Redbird (2005)	The Knuckleball Suite (2006)

Redbird is a recording by Jeffrey Foucault, Kris Delmhorst and Peter Mulvey, performing as Redbird, released in February 2005.

== History ==
All three are artists on the Signature Sounds Recordings label and regularly toured together. Foucault and Delmhorst are married. The trio worked out many of the songs on the road allowing them to record the album in a scant three days. It was recorded on a DAT recorder with one stereo microphone in a living room by David Goodrich.

== Reception ==
Professional ratings
Review scores
Source	Rating
Allmusic	4/5 stars
Minor 7th	(not rated)
No Depression	(no rating)

Writing for Allmusic, critic Chris Nickson wrote that of the album, "Spontaneity rules. Familiar tunes get new readings. Little known gems are unearthed. It's a loosey-goosey affair, with good picking, satisfying harmonies, and loads of fun." David Kleiner of Minor 7th wrote "Put three very diverse singer/songwriters together and try to make them into a group, and you could be looking at a recipe for disaster. Egos, ideas, and experiences all enter the mix. It's remarkable, then, that Redbird sound so cohesive, given that Kris Delmhorst, Jeffrey Foucault, and Peter Mulvey all have established individual careers. It's a record made by people who sound like they genuinely enjoy playing together (which can't be said for many groups), and who've found strong common ground. And finishing with Tom Waits' plaintive "Hold On" is a masterstroke." Writing for No Depression, music critic Buzz McLain wrote of the album "Here’s a trio with a portable DAT machine, a single stereo microphone and a living room in Wisconsin that’s actually made a collection of songs worth listening to. And they stay in key, happy day... The trio has chosen wisely and sequenced beautifully a set of tunes that is transcendent, with skillful but not showy playing on three acoustic guitars, plus accompaniment by David Goodrich on slide guitar, mandolin and papoose guitar, and Delmhorst on occasional fiddle... If only other living-room productions could be as effective..."

== Track listing ==
1. "Ships" (Greg Brown) - 3:02
2. "Moonglow" (Irving Mills, Will Hudson and Eddie DeLange) - 2:55
3. "Patience" (Mark Sandman) - 3:18
4. "Buckets of Rain" (Bob Dylan) - 3:41
5. "The Whole World Round" (Mitchell F. Jayne and Joe Stuart) - 2:22
6. "Ithaca" (Peter Mulvey) - 3:30
7. "Lovely as the Day is Long" (Paul Cebar) - 2:58
8. "Moonshiner" (Traditional) - 4:22
9. "Redbird Waltz" (David Goodrich) - 2:26
10. "Lullaby 101" (Delmhorst) - 3:00
11. "I Gotta Get Drunk" (Willie Nelson) - 2:01
12. "Lighthouse Light" (Ry Cavanaugh) - 3:02
13. "You Are the Everything" (Berry, Buck, Mills, Stipe) - 3:09
14. "Down by the Sally Garden" (Yeats/Traditional) - 2:28
15. "Redbird" (L. Baltimore/Traditional) - 2:26
16. "Drunk Lullaby" (Jeffrey Foucault) - 5:16
17. "Hold On" (Tom Waits) - 4:38

== Personnel ==
- Kris Delmhorst - fiddle, guitar, vocals
- Jeffrey Foucault - guitar, vocals
- Peter Mulvey - guitar, vocals
- David Goodrich - guitar, mandolin, vocals

Production notes:

- Mastered by Ric Probst
- Cover art by Alexander Wilson
- Photography by Eric Vandeveld
