= Hayward Williams =

American singer-songwriter

- Born: John Hayward Williams; February 25, 1981 (age 44); Waukesha, Wisconsin, United States
- Genres: Americana, alt-country, folk, rock
- Occupations: Singer, songwriter, musician
- Instruments: Vocals, guitar, bass guitar
- Years active: 2001–present
- Labels: Machine Records, Continental Record Services
- Website: http://www.haywardwilliams.com/

Hayward Williams is an American singer-songwriter and multi-instrumentalist. Originally from Waukesha, Wisconsin, he now lives in Milwaukee, Wisconsin and is an active recording artist and producer.

== Biography ==
John Hayward Williams began playing and composing music at the age of 13 on his mother's 1964 Gibson LG guitar. In 2001, Williams quit his studies at the University of Wisconsin, Eau Claire to join the award-winning Milwaukee-based band Exit, named Wisconsin Band of the Year in 2004 by the Wisconsin Area Music Industry. Lending bass guitar and vocals to the band's hook-driven pop catalogue, Williams traveled the Midwest circuit and around the country with Exit.

In 2002 Williams independently released Manoverboard, a solo project recorded under a pseudonym, which allowed him the opportunity to play solo engagements throughout the region and served as the foundation for Uphill /Downhill, his 2005 debut under the name Hayward Williams. He soon began touring nationally and internationally, including the 2007 Take Root Festival in Groningen, Netherlands in support of his album Another Sailor's Dream (Machine Records). His 2012 album Haymaker was the result of a successful Kickstarter project and was released on Continental Record Services.

Williams' influences range from 60s singer-songwriters, Bruce Springsteen, and Van Morrison, to Stax-style horns and American soul and folk.

As a collaborative artist, Williams has often performed nationally and internationally with singer-songwriters Kris Delmhorst, Peter Mulvey, and Jeffrey Foucault. In 2019 with musician John Hardin, Williams formed the duo Coyote Brother and released the eponymous album. Williams also produced and performed on Hardin's 2016 album The Piasa Bird.

Williams' album Every Color Blue was produced during the 2020 lockdown as a result of the COVID-19 pandemic, and features contributions from artists such as J. Hardin and John Statz that were recorded remotely. Performances from the album by Williams were featured on Milwaukee Public Radio in August 2020.

Williams lives in Milwaukee, Wisconsin with his wife and three children.

== Discography ==
=== Solo albums ===
- 2005 – Uphill/Downhill
- 2007 – Another Sailor's Dream (Machine Records)
- 2009 – Cotton Bell (Machine Records)
- 2012 – Haymaker (Continental Record Services)
- 2014 – The Reef
- 2017 – Pretenders
- 2020 – Every Color Blue

=== EPs ===
- 2005 –Trench Foot

=== Coyote Brother ===
with J. Hardin

- 2019 – Coyote Brother (2019)
