= Redbird (band) =

American singer-songwriter

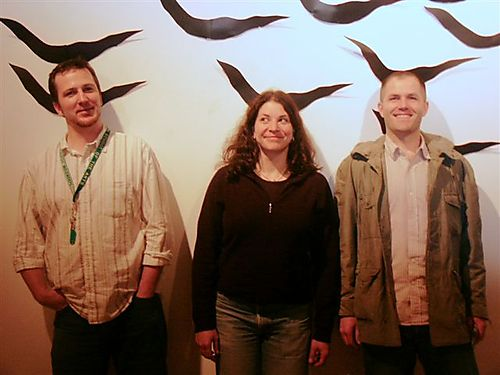
- L-R: Peter Mulvey, Kris Delmhorst, Jeffrey Foucault in 2005.

Background information
- Origin: Wisconsin, Massachusetts
- Genres: Americana, folk
- Years active: 2003-2011
- Label: Signature Sounds Recordings
- Members: Jeffrey Foucault, Kris Delmhorst, Peter Mulvey

Redbird was an Americana / folk trio, comprising Jeffrey Foucault, Kris Delmhorst and Peter Mulvey. All three were artists on the Signature Sounds Recordings label and have regularly toured together. Foucault and Delmhorst are married.

== Discography ==
=== Albums ===
- Redbird (2005, Signature)
- Live at the Cafe Carpe (2011, Signature)

== Members ==
- Jeffrey Foucault
- Kris Delmhorst
- Peter Mulvey
