= Shoot the Moon Right Between the Eyes =

Studio album by Jeffrey Foucault
- Released: 2009
- Genre: Americana, Folk music
- Label: Signature Sounds

Jeffrey Foucault chronology
Ghost Repeater (2006)	Shoot the Moon Right Between the Eyes (2009)	Seven Curses (2010)

Shoot the Moon Right Between the Eyes (sub-titled Jeffrey Foucault Sings the Songs of John Prine) is an album by American singer/songwriter Jeffrey Foucault, released in 2009. It is a tribute to musician John Prine.

== Track listing ==
All tracks are written by John Prine.

No.	Title	Length
1.	"The Late John Garfield Blues"	3:22
2.	"Billy the Bum"	4:45
3.	"He Was in Heaven Before He Died"	3:22
4.	"Unwed Fathers" (Prine, Braddock)	3:49
5.	"Hello in There"	4:47
6.	"One Red Rose"	3:17
7.	"Speed of the Sound of Loneliness"	4:58
8.	"Far from Me"	5:55
9.	"Daddy's Little Pumpkin"	2:32
10.	"Mexican Home"	3:35
11.	"Storm Windows"	4:45
12.	"That's the Way That the World Goes 'Round"	2:58
13.	"Clocks and Spoons"	9:26

== Personnel ==
- Jeffrey Foucault - vocals, guitar, baritone guitar, Mellotron
- Mark Erelli – electric guitar, lap steel guitar, background vocals
- David "Goody" Goodrich – guitar
- Eric Heywood – pedal steel guitar
- Annelies Howell – background vocals
- Peter Mulvey – guitar, lap steel guitar
- Kris Delmhorst - background vocals
- Zak Trojano – drums

Production notes:

- Lorne Entress – engineer
- Mike Zirkel – engineer
- Don Heffington – engineer
- Peter Mulvey – engineer
- Justin Pizzoferrato – engineer, mixing
- Alex McCollough – mastering
