= Redbird =

Redbird, Redbirds, Red Bird or Red Birds may refer to:

== Bird ==
- Redbird, another name for the northern cardinal
- Redbird, another name for the summer tanager
- Red bird of paradise, a near threatened species

=== Mythological ===
- An East Asian variant of the phoenix
  - Vermilion Bird or Red Bird

== People ==
- Red Bird (c. 1788–1828), Ho-Chunk chief
- Redbird Smith (1850–1918), Cherokee traditionalist
- Zitkala-Ša (Red Bird, Gertrude Bonnin) (1876–1938), Yankton Dakota author
- Red Bird (baseball) (1890–1972), American baseball player
- Che-se-quah (Red Bird, Joan Hill) (1930–2020), Muscogee Creek-Cherokee artist

== Place in the United States ==
- Redbird, Kentucky
- Redbird, Missouri
- Redbird, Nebraska
- Redbird, Oklahoma
- Redbird, New York
- Redbird, Dallas, a neighborhood in the Oak Cliff area of Dallas, Texas
- Redbird, West Virginia
- Red Bird River, a tributary of the Kentucky River

== Music ==
- Redbird (band), an American Americana/folk trio
- Redbird (John Zorn album), 1995
- Redbird (Heather Nova album), 2005
- Redbird (Redbird album), 2005
- Red Bird Records, a record label founded by Jerry Leiber and Mike Stoller
- Redbird Records, an independent record label founded by Ludo

== Popular culture ==
- Redbird (comics), the name of Robin's car from Batman comics, and one of the aliases of Damian Wayne
- Red Bird (web series), an American television Western web series
- Redbird, the mascot of De Pere High School in De Pere, Wisconsin
- Redbird, slang for a $5 casino chip
- Red, the main character in Angry Birds commonly referred to as "Red Bird"
- The Red Bird (Astrid Lindgren book), book by Astrid Lindgren

== Sports ==
- The Redbirds, nickname of the St. Louis Cardinals, a Major League Baseball team
- Memphis Redbirds, the Memphis class AAA minor league baseball team
- Louisville Redbirds, the former name of the Louisville Bats minor league baseball team
- Hamilton Redbirds, a defunct minor league baseball team that played from 1988 to 1992
- Glens Falls Redbirds, a defunct minor league baseball team that played in 1993
- Union Springs Redbirds, a defunct minor league baseball team that played from 1936 to 1938 in Alabama
- Columbus Red Birds, a defunct minor league baseball team that played from 1931 to 1954 in Ohio
- Columbus Red Birds (Georgia), a defunct minor league baseball team that played from 1909 to 1959 in Georgia, best known as the Columbus Foxes
- Raleigh Red Birds, a name used by some defunct minor league baseball teams in Raleigh, North Carolina
- Williamson Red Birds, a defunct minor league baseball team that played from 1939 to 1942
- Huntsville Red Birds, a defunct minor league baseball team that played in 1935 in Arkansas
- Geneva Red Birds, a defunct minor league baseball team that played in 1946 and 1950 in Alabama
- Illinois State Redbirds, athletic teams from Illinois State University

== Other uses ==
- Redbird Flight Simulations, an American flight simulator manufacturer
- Redbird trains, 1960s New York City Subway cars that were painted in a deep red paint scheme
- RedBird Capital Partners, an American investment management firm

== See also ==
- Bird (disambiguation)
- Red (disambiguation)
- Phoenix (disambiguation)
- Firebird (disambiguation)
