= One for Sorrow =

One for Sorrow may refer to:

- "One for Sorrow" (nursery rhyme), a traditional children's nursery rhyme
- "One for Sorrow" (song), a 1998 song by British pop group Steps
- One for Sorrow (Reed and Mayer novel), the first book in the John, the Lord Chamberlain series of historical mysteries
- One for Sorrow (Barzak novel), a 2007 novel written by American writer Christopher Barzak
- One for Sorrow (album), a 2011 album by melodic death metal band Insomnium
- "One for Sorrow", a song by American singer/songwriter Jeffrey Foucault from the album Ghost Repeater
- "One for Sorrow" (Doctors), a 2004 television episode
- "One for Sorrow" (Lewis), a 2015 television episode
