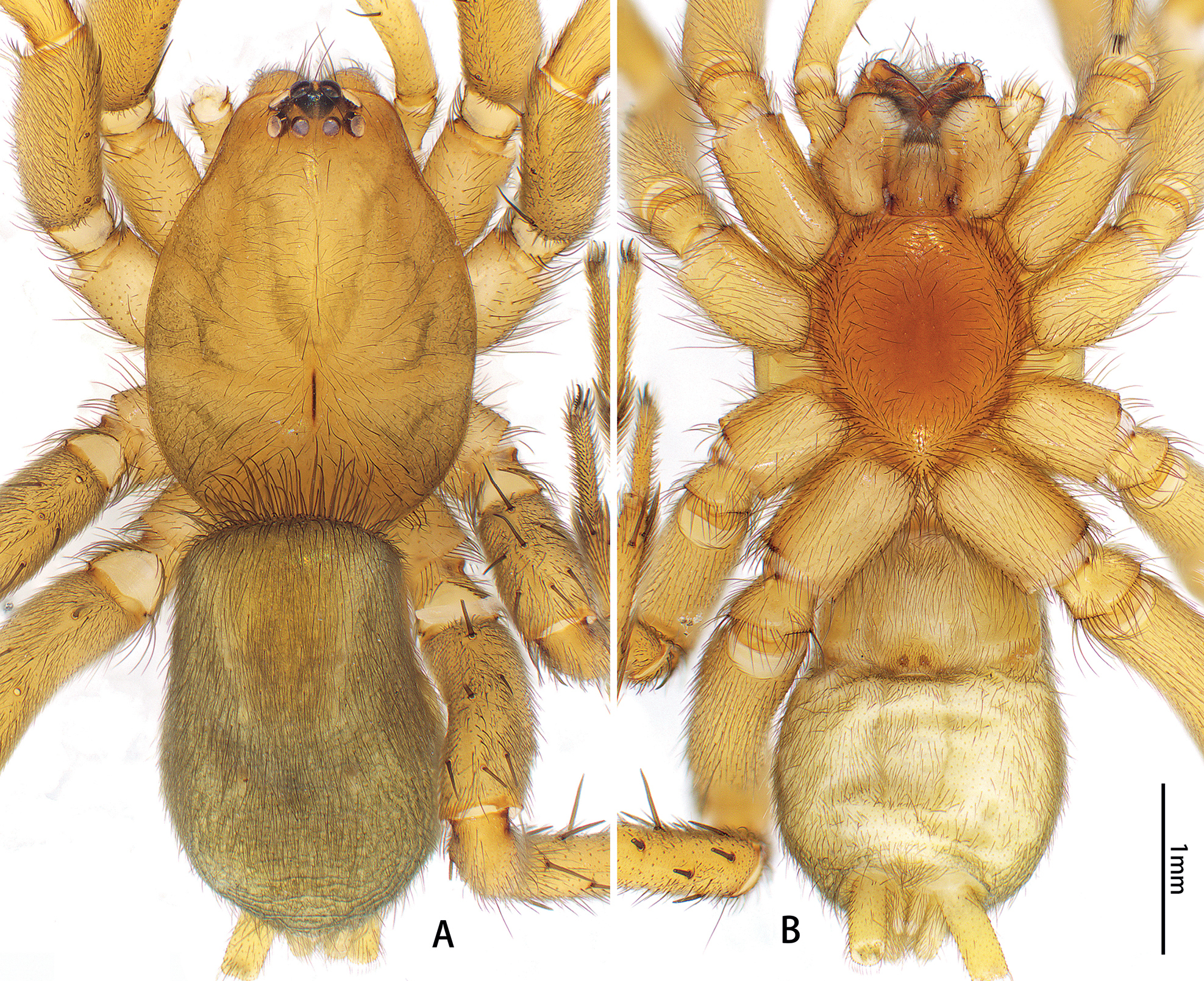
- Male individual
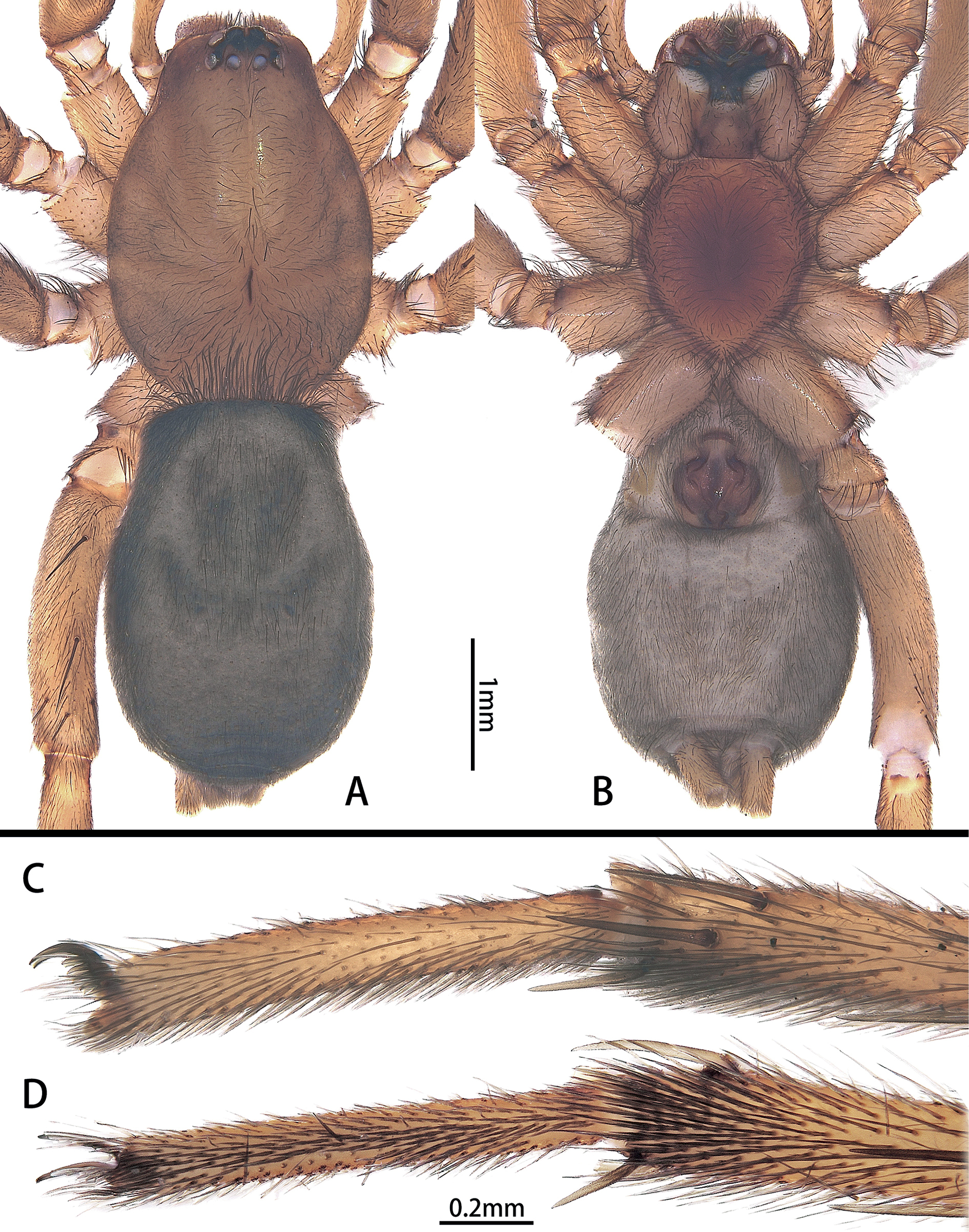
- Female individual

Scientific classification
- Kingdom: Animalia
- Phylum: Arthropoda
- Subphylum: Chelicerata
- Class: Arachnida
- Order: Araneae
- Infraorder: Araneomorphae
- Family: Gnaphosidae
- Genus: Hotwheels; Liu & Zhang, 2024
- Species: H. sisyphus

Binomial name
- Hotwheels sisyphus Liu & Zhang, 2024
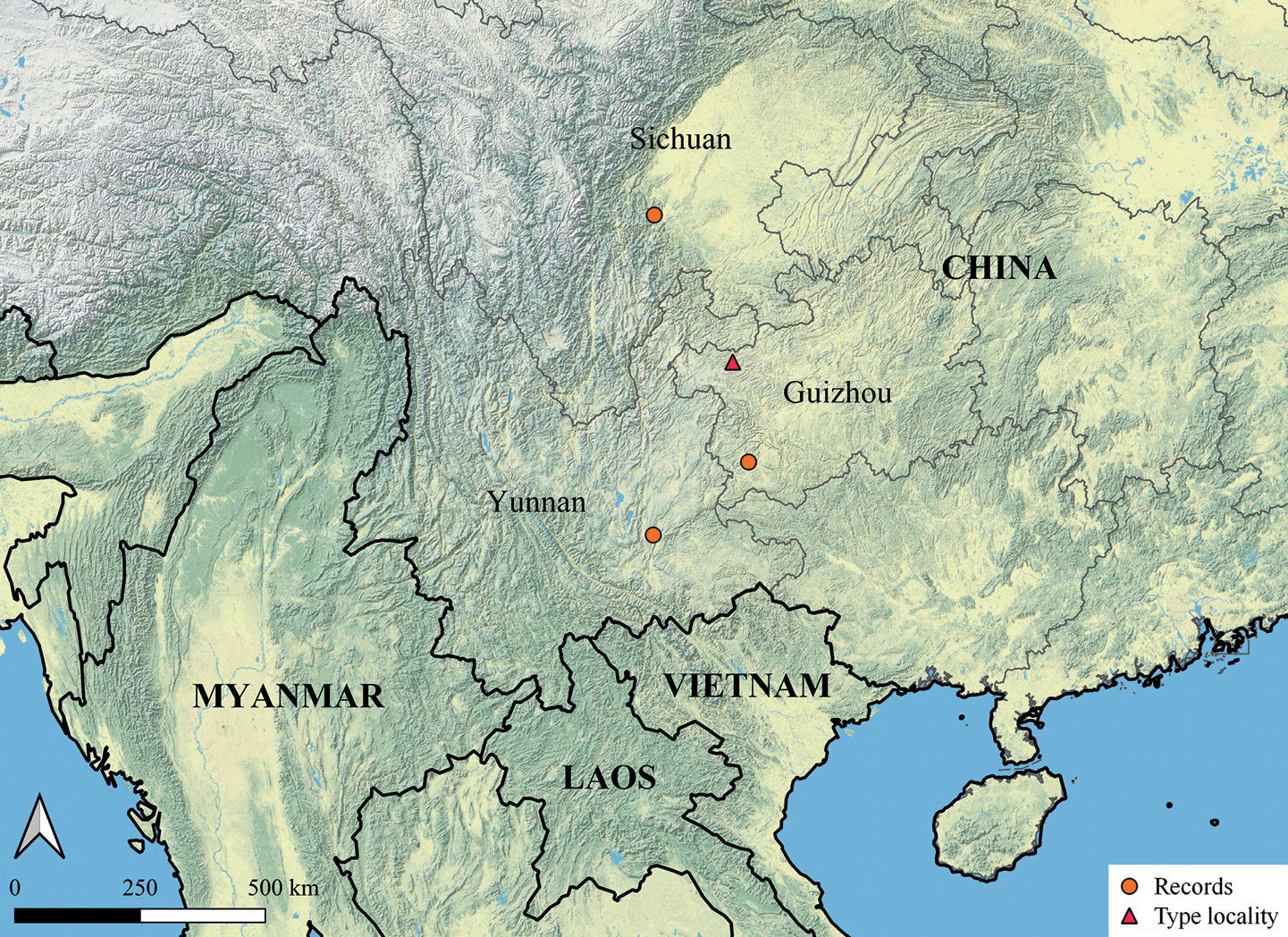
- Distribution across southwestern China. The markers located distribution while the triangle marker marks type specimen.

= Hotwheels sisyphus =

Species of spider named for a popular brand

Hotwheels sisyphus is a species of Chinese ground spiders (family Gnaphosidae). It is the only species in the genus Hotwheels. It was first described by Bo Liu and Feng Zhang, both from Hebei University, in 2024, and has only been found in China.

== Etymology ==
The genus name is derived from Hot Wheels, an American brand of scale model cars. The long coiled embolus of the palpal bulb of this new genus reminded the authors of a looping Hot Wheels track. The species is named for Sisyphus, a king from Greek mythology, who is punished by the gods for cheating death. For this, the gods sentenced him to an eternity of rolling a boulder up a hill, only for it to roll back down. The cyclical nature of his punishment reminded the authors of the circular copulatory tube of the spider.

== Description ==
This species is small in size with males having a total length of 4.86–5.44 mm (0.191–0.214 in) while females have a total length of 5.45–5.98 mm (0.215–0.235 in). They have a overall yellow-brown color carapace while its abdomen is grey in color. The legs are brown.

== Distribution ==
It is only known to be found in China, specifically in the southwestern provinces Guizhou (type specimen location), Sichuan and Yunnan.
