= Firehawk =

Firehawk may refer to:

- Birds of prey, such as the black kite

== Arts and entertainment ==
- Firehawk (comics), a DC Comics character
- Firehawk (roller coaster), at Kings Island, Mason, Ohio, United States

=== Video games ===
- FireHawk (video game), a 1991 Codemasters game
- Thexder 2 (or Fire Hawk), a 1989 DOS run-and-gun game
- Tom Clancy's H.A.W.X (formerly Tom Clancy's Firehawk), a 2009 arcade flight game

== Vehicles ==
- Sikorsky S-70A Firehawk, a firefighting helicopter variant
- The Firehawk, a Pontiac Firebird sportscar performance option
- Firestone Firehawk, a Firestone Tire and Rubber Company brand

== See also ==
- Fire (disambiguation)
- Firebird (disambiguation)
- Hawk (disambiguation)
