= Deora (custom car) =

Dodge Deora
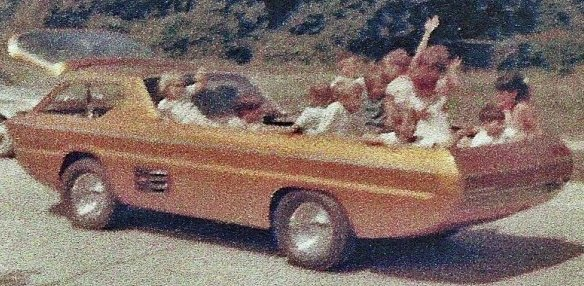

Overview
- Manufacturer: Dodge (Chrysler) (modified by Alexander Brothers and Harry Bentley Bradley)
- Production: 1965-1967
- Designer: Harry Bentley Bradley

Body and chassis
- Class: Custom car
- Layout: Front-mid engine, rear wheel drive
- Related: Dodge A100

Powertrain
- Engine: 170ci (2.8L) Slant-6
- Transmission: 3-speed manual

The Deora is a 1965 Dodge A100 pickup truck that was heavily customized by Mike and Larry Alexander in Detroit for the 1967 Detroit Autorama. Harry Bentley Bradley designed the Deora and helped with the build process. After winning many awards, including the Ridler in 1967, it became the prototype for a Hot Wheels car, and plastic model kit. It was sold at auction in 2009 for US$ 324,500.

== Design ==
In 1964, Harry Bentley Bradley was commissioned to design it by the Alexander brothers. The Deora is based on the compact Dodge A100 pickup. The back hatch of a 1960 Ford station wagon served as the windshield. It was chopped, sectioned, and channelled to create the fully functional, futuristic-looking pickup. The slant six engine and 3-speed manual transmission were moved rearward 380 mm (15 in), out of the cab and into the bed and covered by the hard tonneau. Entry into the gold-painted custom is achieved by lifting up the windshield, swivelling the lower gate and entering through the front.

In 1967, it was unveiled in the Alexander brothers' home town during the Detroit Autorama, where it won nine awards including the Ridler Award.

The name Deora came from a naming contest run by AMT model cars. Harry Bradley had proposed to call it XTAB (standing for eXperimental Truck Alexander Brothers). The winning entry was from a 13-year-old boy. The idea for the name Deora came from a technically incorrect version of the Spanish word for "golden".

Chrysler liked the resulting truck so well that they leased it for two years to display with their other factory concept cars. It was then put into storage after being sold to Al Davis. His son took the Deora out of storage in 1998, and Harry Bradley was asked to help restore it. The finished restoration took part in the 50th-anniversary Detroit Autorama in 2002 as part of a special display of classic Alexander brothers customs.

In 2009 the Deora was put up for auction in California and was sold for $324,500 (equivalent to $487,000 in 2025). It was described as featuring a 101 bhp (75 kW; 102 PS) 6-cylinder 170 cu in (2,800 cc) engine.

== Hot Wheels ==
The Deora is also a major player in Hot Wheels history. It was part of the "Sweet 16" Hot Wheels cars in 1968. In 2000, the Deora II was released, a modern interpretation version of the original. The vehicle is also Joseph "Vert" Wheeler's signature car in Hot Wheels: World Race and the AcceleRacers series.

Three years later, in preparation for Hot Wheels' 35th anniversary, a full size Deora II was unveiled. It was built by Chip Foose and Fiveaxis, and sports a Cadillac Northstar V8 engine.

In 2019, Hot Wheels released a third generation of the Deora, the Deora III. However, its more open design causes it to resemble its two predecessors less than they resemble each other. It still has a surfboard in the back, as well as an electric bicycle. Despite its design, it was intended to depict a futuristic version of the Deoras.
