= Horse Latitudes (album) =

Studio album by Jeffrey Foucault
- Released: May 3, 2011
- Recorded: October 2010
- Genre: Americana, Folk music
- Length: 38:39
- Label: Signature Sounds
- Producer: Jeffrey Foucault

Jeffrey Foucault chronology
Cold Satellite (2010)	Horse Latitudes (2011)

Horse Latitudes is an album by American singer/songwriter Jeffrey Foucault, released in 2011.

== Reception ==
Professional ratings
Review scores
Source	Rating
Allmusic	3/5 stars
Minor 7th	(not rated)

Writing for Allmusic, critic William Ruhlman wrote that "Singer/songwriter Jeffrey Foucault likes to play in a familiar, slow-moving country-folk style; this is a guy who has been to the desert on "A Horse with No Name," searching for a "Heart of Gold." The lyrical reflections he expresses so introspectively also tend to be spare and allusive... For the most part, however, Foucault is a miniaturist as interested in evoking mood as meaning in his atmospheric music, expecting his listeners to fill in the blanks." David Kleiner of Minor 7th wrote "Writers should check out Foucault's similes, here ("singing / darker than the sea") and throughout ("smoking like a river / in the dark before the dawn"), as the comparison is always unexpected and richer for it... What you remember is, "When I had one good coat, I was warm." You disappear. Only Foucault's songs remain, as haunting as they are haunted."

== Track listing ==
All songs by Jeffrey Foucault.

1. "Horse Latitudes" – 5:20
2. "Pretty Girl in a Small Town" – 2:32
3. "Starlight and Static" – 3:31
4. "Heart to the Husk" – 2:33
5. "Last Night I Dreamed of Television" – 4:05
6. "Goners Most" – 4:53
7. "Everybody's Famous" – 4:37
8. "Idaho" – 3:49
9. "Passerines" – 4:33
10. "Tea and Tobacco" – 2:46

== Personnel ==
- Jeffrey Foucault - vocals, acoustic guitar
- Kris Delmhorst - cello, fiddle
- Jennifer Condos – bass
- Billy Conway – drums
- Eric Heywood – baritone guitar, electric guitar pedal steel
- Van Dyke Parks – accordion, organ (Hammond), piano

Production notes:

- Jeffrey Foucault - producer
- Alex McCollough – mastering
- Justin Pizzoferrato – engineer
- Pete Weiss – engineer
- Ryan Freeland – engineer, mixing
- Kris Delmhorst – photography
- Matt Dellinger – liner notes
- Renee Fernandez – design, layout
