= Hot Wheels =

Brand of scale model cars by Mattel

- Product type: Scale model cars, racing tracks
- Current owner: Mattel
- Produced by: Mattel
- Country: United States
- Introduced: May 18, 1968; 58 years ago
- Markets: Worldwide
- Website: hotwheels.com

Hot Wheels is an American media franchise and brand of scale model cars invented by Elliot Handler and introduced by his company Mattel on May 18, 1968. It was the primary competitor of Matchbox until Mattel bought Matchbox owner Tyco Toys in 1997.

Many automobile manufacturers have since licensed Hot Wheels to make scale models of their cars, allowing the use of original design blueprints and detailing. Although Hot Wheels were originally intended to be children's toys, they have become popular with adult collectors, for whom limited edition models are now made available.

== History ==
=== Development ===
In the late 1960s, Elliot Handler, co-founder of Mattel, developed the concept for Hot Wheels as a toy line that would appeal to boys in the same way their Barbie had to girls. Handler was inspired to create a new line of toy cars after seeing his son Kenneth play with Matchbox cars. Unlike Matchbox, which focused on small-scale models of real production vehicles, Handler envisioned Hot Wheels as a line of exaggerated, customized "hot rod" cars, featuring big rear tires, superchargers, flame paint jobs, hood blowers, and outlandish proportions. He began producing the cars with assistance from fellow engineer Jack Ryan. The flame logo was designed by artist Rick Irons, who worked at Mattel at the time. Mattel first unveiled 16 Hot Wheels cars in the 1968 New York Toy Fair.

The first line of Hot Wheels cars, known as The Original Sweet 16 were manufactured in 1967. These were the first of the Red Line Series, named for the tires which had a red pin stripe on their sides.

There were sixteen castings released, eleven of them designed by Harry Bentley Bradley with assistance from Handler and Ryan. The first one produced was a dark blue "Custom Camaro". Bradley was from the car industry and had designed the body for the full-sized Deora concept car and the Custom Fleetside, based on his own customized 1966 El Camino.

The lineup consisted of the following:

- Beatnik Bandit
- Custom Eldorado
- Custom Camaro
- Custom Corvette
- Custom Fleetside
- Deora
- Custom Mustang
- Custom T-Bird
- Hot Heap
- Ford J-Car
- Custom Cougar
- Custom Firebird
- Custom Barracuda
- Python (Note: This car was designed by the staff of Car Craft Magazine in 1961.)
- Silhouette
- Custom Volkswagen

=== Racing track set ===
Mattel produced a racing track set which was sold separately. Though it would be updated throughout the years, the original track set consists of a series of bright orange road sections (pieced together to form an oblong, circular race track), with one (or sometimes two) "superchargers" (faux service stations through which cars passed on the tracks, featuring battery-powered spinning wheels, which would propel the cars along the tracks).

Hot Wheels' use of wide, hard-plastic tires created much less friction and tracked more smoothly than the narrow metal or plastic wheels used on contemporary Matchbox cars. Hot Wheels cars were designed to roll easily and at high speeds, which was a great innovation at the time.

=== 1968–1977: The "Redline" era ===
The Hot Wheels brand was successful, disrupting the industry for small die-cast car models from 1968 onward. They forced Matchbox and other competitors to rethink their concepts. Harry Bentley Bradley did not think that would be the case and had quit Mattel to go back to the car industry. When the company asked him to come back, he recommended a good friend, Ira Gilford. Gilford, who had just left Chrysler, quickly accepted the job of designing the next Hot Wheels models. Some of Hot Wheels' greatest cars, such as the Twin Mill and Splittin' Image, came from Ira Gilford's drawing board. The Twin Mill was introduced in 1969 and was used to create the company's first full-scale replica car in 2001.

The success of the 1968 line was solidified and consolidated with the 1969 releases, with which Hot Wheels effectively established itself as the hottest brand of small toy car models in the USA. Splittin' Image, Torero, Turbofire, and Twin Mill were part of the "Show & Go" series and are the very first original in-house designs by Hot Wheels.

The initial prototypes of the Beach Bomb were faithful to the shape of a real VW Type 2 "bus", and had two surfboards sticking out the back window, in a nod to the VW's perceived association with the surfing community and the slang term for a person who spends much time surfing—a "beach bum". During the fledgling Hot Wheels era, Mattel wanted to make sure that each of the cars could be used with any of the playsets and stunt track sets. Unfortunately, testing showed that this early version (now known among collectors as the Rear-Loader Beach Bomb, or "RLBB") was too narrow to roll effectively on Hot Wheels track or be powered by the Super Charger, and was too top-heavy to negotiate high-speed corners.

Hot Wheels designers Howard Rees and Larry Wood modified the casting, extending the side fenders to accommodate the track width, as well as providing a new place on the vehicle to store each of the plastic surfboards. The roof was also cut away and replaced by a full-length sunroof, to lower the center of gravity. Nicknamed the Side-loader by collectors, this was the production version of the Beach Bomb.

The Rear-Loader Beach Bomb is widely considered the "Holy Grail", or ultimate pinnacle, of a serious Hot Wheels collection. An unknown number were made as test subjects and given to employees. A regular production Beach Bomb may be worth up to $600, depending on condition. Market prices on RLBBs however, have easily reached the five-figure plateau, ranging from $70,000 to $120,000. The Petersen Automotive Museum in Los Angeles had a pink RLBB in its Hot Wheels exhibit, displayed alone on a rotating platform under glass. The Hot Wheels Collectors Club released a new, updated version of the Rear Loading Beach Bomb in 2002 as a limited edition.

1970 was a successful year for Hot Wheels, so Mattel came up with a new advertising slogan for the cars: "Go With the Winner". 43 new cars appeared that year, including the Sizzlers and Heavyweights lines. Howard Rees, who worked with Ira Gilford, was tired of designing cars. He wanted to work on the Major Matt Mason action figure toy line-up. Rees had a good friend by the name of Larry Wood, whom he worked with at Ford designing cars. When Wood found out about Hot Wheels at a party Rees was holding, Rees offered him the job of designing Hot Wheels models. Wood accepted, and, by the end of the week, Wood was working at Mattel, where his first design was the Tri-Baby. Larry Wood retired in 2019 after over 40 years of designing cars.

Another designer, Paul Tam, joined Wood and Gilford. Tam's first design was the Whip Creamer. Tam continued to work for Mattel until 1973. Among the many fantastic designs Tam thought up for Hot Wheels, some of the collector's favorites include Evil Weevil (a Volkswagen Beetle with two engines), Open Fire (an AMC Gremlin with six wheels), Six Shooter (another six-wheeled car), and the rare Double Header (co-designed with Larry Wood).

The year 1970 introduced "the Snake and the Mongoose", a manufactured 'rivalry' between two professional drag racers calling themselves "the Snake" and "the Mongoose" for the purposes of publicity. This was notably drag racing's first major non-automotive corporate sponsor, and the beginning of the NHRA's booming popularity with large-budget teams and championships. 1970 also introduced the first 'Silver Series', which contained three silver-painted models: the Boss Hoss, the Heavy Chevy, and the King 'Kuda, which were only obtainable through a mail-in offer that included a membership to the Hot Wheels Club.

These three cars featured "supercharged" engines (featuring large Roots blowers) without hoods, and open exhaust headers, after the style of drag racing cars of the era. Popular among children, these 'Silver Cars' were considered faster than the rest of the Hot Wheels lineup, because they were supposedly heavier than the other gravity models, but the accuracy of this claim has never been tested under scientific conditions.

1972 and 1973 were slow years. Only seven new models were made in 1972. Of the 24 models appearing for 1973, only three were new models. Also the cars changed from Mattel's in-house Spectraflame colors to mostly drab, solid enamel colors, which mainstream Hot Wheels cars still use today. Due to low sales, and the fact that the majority of the castings were not re-used in later years, the 1972-3 models are known to be very collectible.

In 1974, Hot Wheels introduced its 'Flying Colors' line, and added flashy decals and "tampo-printed" paint designs which helped revitalize sales. As with the lower-friction wheels in 1968, this innovation was revolutionary in the industry, and—although far less effective in terms of sales impact than in 1968—was copied by the competition, who did not want to be outmaneuvered again by Mattel product strategists.

In 1977, the 'Redline Wheel' was phased out, with the red lines no longer being printed on the wheels. This cut costs, but also reflected that the prototypical "red line tires" popular on high-speed-rated automotive tires during the era of muscle cars and Polyglas tires were no longer popular. During this period, there was a trend away from wild hot rods and fantastic cars, and a move to more realistic cars and trucks, like the competitor Matchbox.

=== 1977–1988: The 'Blackwalls' era ===
In 1981, Hot Ones wheels were introduced, which had gold-painted hubs, and claimed to have thinner axles for greater speed, along with additional suspension compliance that older production Hot Wheels lacked. Ultra Hot Wheels were introduced in 1984, and looked something like the cast alloy wheels found on a 1980s-era high-trim Renault Fuego or a Mazda 626, with three parallel dark lines cutting diagonally across the flat chrome face of the wheel, all three broken in the center to form six individual shorter lines. These new "Ultra Hots" claimed further speed improvements. Hot Wheels started offering models based on 1980s-era sports and economy cars, like the Pontiac Fiero or Dodge Omni 024, in addition to their typical 'hot rod' and muscle car style offerings. In 1983, a new style of wheel called Real Riders was introduced, which featured real rubber tires. Despite the fact that they were very popular, the Real Riders line was short-lived, because of high production costs. In the late 1980s, the so-called Blue Card blister pack color scheme was introduced, which would become the basis of Hot Wheels colors still used today (original blister packs were red and yellow). Two other innovations were introduced briefly in Hot Wheels cars in the 1980s – Thermal Color Change paint, and rotating 'crash panel' vehicles ("Crack-Ups"). The former was able to change color on exposure to hot or cold water, and there was an initial release of 20 different cars, available as sets of three vehicles. The latter were vehicles with a panel that, on contact, would rotate to reveal a reverse side that appeared to be heavily dented. Variations in crash panels included front, rear and side panels, the last of whose mechanism has proven to be the most durable.

In the 1980s, Hot Wheels had gotten into a controversy with General Motors' Chevrolet Motors Division. In 1982, the Chevrolet Corvette had ended the curvaceous "Mako Shark" body style that had been in production for almost 15 years, and GM announced that the Corvette would be redesigned. In 1983, Chevrolet started to produce the all-new C4 Corvette but had assembly line problems which pushed production back 6 months causing GM's Marketing Department to label all 1983s as 1984s once they got production perfected so it would seem to the public that the all-new C4 Corvette came out early rather than late. But Hot Wheels saw what the new model of Corvette was going to look like before GM's official unveiling, and they designed a die-cast version of the 1984 Corvette. GM was angered and almost pulled its licensing with Mattel, but this controversy helped Corvette enthusiasts see what the new Corvette was going to look like. The 1984 Corvette production ran for 1.5 model years covering half of the remaining 1983 model year and ending on time for the 1985 model year.

In conjunction with Epyx Software, Mattel released a computer game edition of Hot Wheels for various 8-bit platforms in 1985, as part of the Computer Activity Toys series.

=== 1989–1994: The collector number era ===
In 1989, Mattel released collector numbers. Each car had its own number. The cards were all blue, for all blister packs released from 1989 to 1994. Numbers included went as high as 274; however, these were skip numbered, and numbers such as 48, 61, and 173 were not used.

=== 1995–1999: The Treasure Hunt era ===
1995 brought a major change to the Hot Wheels line, where the cars were split up into series. One was the 1995 Model Series, which included all of that year's new castings. In 1996, the Model Series was renamed to First Editions. 1995 also saw the introduction of the Treasure Hunt Series (see below). The rest of the series included four cars with paint schemes that followed a theme. For example, the Pearl Driver cars all had pearlescent paint.

Sales for the series models soared with another program also introduced that year called the Bonus Car program, causing stores across the nation to have shortages. Purchasing the four car sets and sending in the packaging backs plus a handling fee gave you the opportunity to collect the bonus cars, 1 each released for each quarter of the year starting in 1996 through at least 2000. Several new wheel designs were also introduced in the 1990s.

Mattel bought Tyco Toys in 1997. Along with the purchase came the company's old competitor Matchbox. Arguably the two dominant companies in matchbox-sized cars were now under one roof.

In 1998, Mattel celebrated the 30th anniversary of the Hot Wheels brand by replicating various cars and individual packaging from its 30-year history and packaging these replicated vehicles in special 30th Anniversary boxes. In 1999, Hot Wheels Interactive was launched.

=== 2000s ===
A new generation of Hot Wheels Designers came in. Eric Tscherne and Fraser Campbell along with former designer Paul Tam's son, Alec Tam, joined the design team. Tscherne's Seared Tuner (formerly Sho-Stopper) graced the mainline packaging from 2000 to 2003. The Deora II, one of only two Hot Wheels concept cars ever made into full-size, functional cars, was also released this year.

In 2001, Mattel created a Hot Wheels collectors website.

Also in 2001, Mattel issued 240 mainline releases consisting of 12 Treasure Hunts, 36 First Editions, 12 Segment Series with four cars each, and 144 open stock cars. Popular models that debuted include the HyperMite and FrightBike.

For 2002, the mainline consisted of 12 Treasure Hunts, 42 First Editions, 15 Segment Series of 4 cars each, and 126 open stock cars. Popular new models included the `68 Cougar and the Nissan Skyline GT-R. Some cars from the first editions series are the Backdraft, Overbored 454, and Super Tsunami.

In 2003, Hot Wheels celebrated its 35th anniversary with a full-length animated film called Hot Wheels Highway 35 World Race. This movie tied into the Highway 35 line of cars that featured 35 classic Hot Wheels cars with special graphics and co-molded wheels.

In 2004, Hot Wheels unveiled its "Hot 100" line of 100 new models. These included mostly short-lived lines of cartoonish vehicles such as Tooned (vehicles based on the larger Hot Tunerz line of Hot Wheels created by Eric Tscherne), Blings (boxy bodies and big wheels), Hardnoze (enlarged fronts), Crooze (stretched out bodies), and Fatbax (super-wide rear wheels and short bodies). Blings models included vehicles such as the Lotus Esprit and Cadillac Escalade, while Fatbax models included vehicles such as the 2004 Mustang GT, Shelby Cobra 427 S/C, Toyota Supra, and Corvette C6. These vehicles did not sell as well as Mattel expected, and many could still be found in stores throughout 2005. Mattel also released 2004 First Editions cars with unpainted Zamac bodies. They were sold through Toys 'R' Us and were made in limited numbers.

In 2005, Hot Wheels continued with new "extreme" castings for the second year, debuting the Torpedoes line (skinny bodies and outboard wheels) and Drop Tops (flattened rooflines and wheel arches that extend above the car's roofline), in addition to 20 "Realistix" models. The rest of the line included the standard 12 Treasure Hunts, 10 Track Aces, 50 Segment Series Cars, and 50 Open Stock Models. Four Volkswagen "Mystery Cars" were offered as a special mail-in promo. Each Mystery Car came with a special voucher. Upon collection of all 4 vouchers, one was able to send away for a special 13th Treasure Hunt, a VW Drag Bus.

Hot Wheels also unveiled its new "Faster than Ever" line of cars, which had special nickel-plated axles, along with bronze-colored Open-Hole 5 Spoke wheels. These adjustments supposedly reduced friction dramatically. The first run of these cars were available for a limited time only, from the beginning of October towards the end of November 2005.

Also, a continuation of the movie Highway 35 called Hot Wheels AcceleRacers was created, taking place two years after the events of Highway 35. It is featured in four movies and many short segments where the drivers (old ones, gangs, like Teku, Metal Maniacs, the evil Racing Drones, and the stealthy Silencerz). All of the shorts and previews of the movies were placed on a temporary website that was deleted shortly after the last movie.

2006 was the final year of the First Editions series consisting of 38 cars for that year including a Toyota AE86, 2006 Honda Civic Si, Plymouth Superbird and 2007 Cadillac Escalade along with fantasy models like the Nerve Hammer, Pharodox, Semi-Psycho as well as the fan-favourite Bone Shaker, Larry Wood's most popular design to date.

In 2007, Mattel released 36 New Models (formerly First Editions), 12 Treasure Hunts (with a hard-to-find regular version and even rarer "Super Treasure Hunt" version of each with rubber Real Rider tires and Spectraflame paint), 12 'Teams' of 4 cars each (formerly Segment Series), 24 Code Cars (codes imprinted inside the packaging that can be used to unlock web content), 12 Track Stars (formerly Track Aces), 24 Mystery Cars (packaged on a card with an opaque blister, so the buyer cannot see which car is inside without opening it), and 24 All-Stars (formerly Open Stock).

In late 2006, a new package design for 2007 was released. Some 2006 cars and all 2007 cars are packaged on a blister card with the new design. Hot Wheels released a series called Modifighters, which are similar to Transformers except for the fact that they were originally cars and were modified into robots. The Modifighters names are: Streetwyse, Skullface, Live Wire, Bedlam, Nightlife, Mr. Big, and Quick-Tyme.

In 2008, all the series and vehicles were relatively similar to 2007's cars. Approximately 180 to 200 new vehicles were released.

In 2009, Mattel released 42 New Models, 12 Treasure Hunts, 12 Track Stars, 24 Mystery Cars, 10 Segment Series of 10 cars, and introduced the Indy Car Series drivers.

Mattel released its first-ever animated episodic television series called Hot Wheels Battle Force 5, which was a co-production between Canadian animation studios, Nelvana and Nerd Corps Entertainment. (now WildBrain.) The series debuted in the United States on Cartoon Network on August 29, 2009.

=== 2010–2016 ===
2011 saw the release of 244 cars beginning with the 2011 New Car Series which includes the Lamborghini Gallardo LP570-4 Superleggera, Custom 2011 Camaro, and the DeLorean time machine from the Back to the Future series. This was followed by the 15-car Treasure Hunt series with 1957 Chevy and 1958 Chevy Impala, 15 Track Stars including the 2010 Formula Street series, the 10x10 series, the Thrill Racers series, and 22 HW Video Game Heroes which were packaged with codes for an internet computer game. The new series "Team Hot Wheels" appeared in late 2011.

2012 saw the release of 247 cars, beginning with the 2012 New Car Series which includes the Lamborghini Aventador, Ford Mustang Boss 302 Laguna Seca, KITT from Knight Rider, and the ever-popular Scooby-Doo Mystery Machine. 2012 also saw the release of two vehicles from the Angry Birds video game franchise, consisting of the Red Bird and the green Minion Pig.

2013 saw the release of 250 cars including Stunt, Racing, Imagination, City, and Showroom, all of which contain sub-series. 2013 also saw a change in the look of the packaging cards which includes a quartet of helmeted motorcycle riders standing behind the flame logo and the Treasure Hunt series cards no longer marked with a treasure chest. Some of those cars include Rodzilla, Fangula, Twin Mill III (3), Bone Shaker and Baja Bone Shaker.

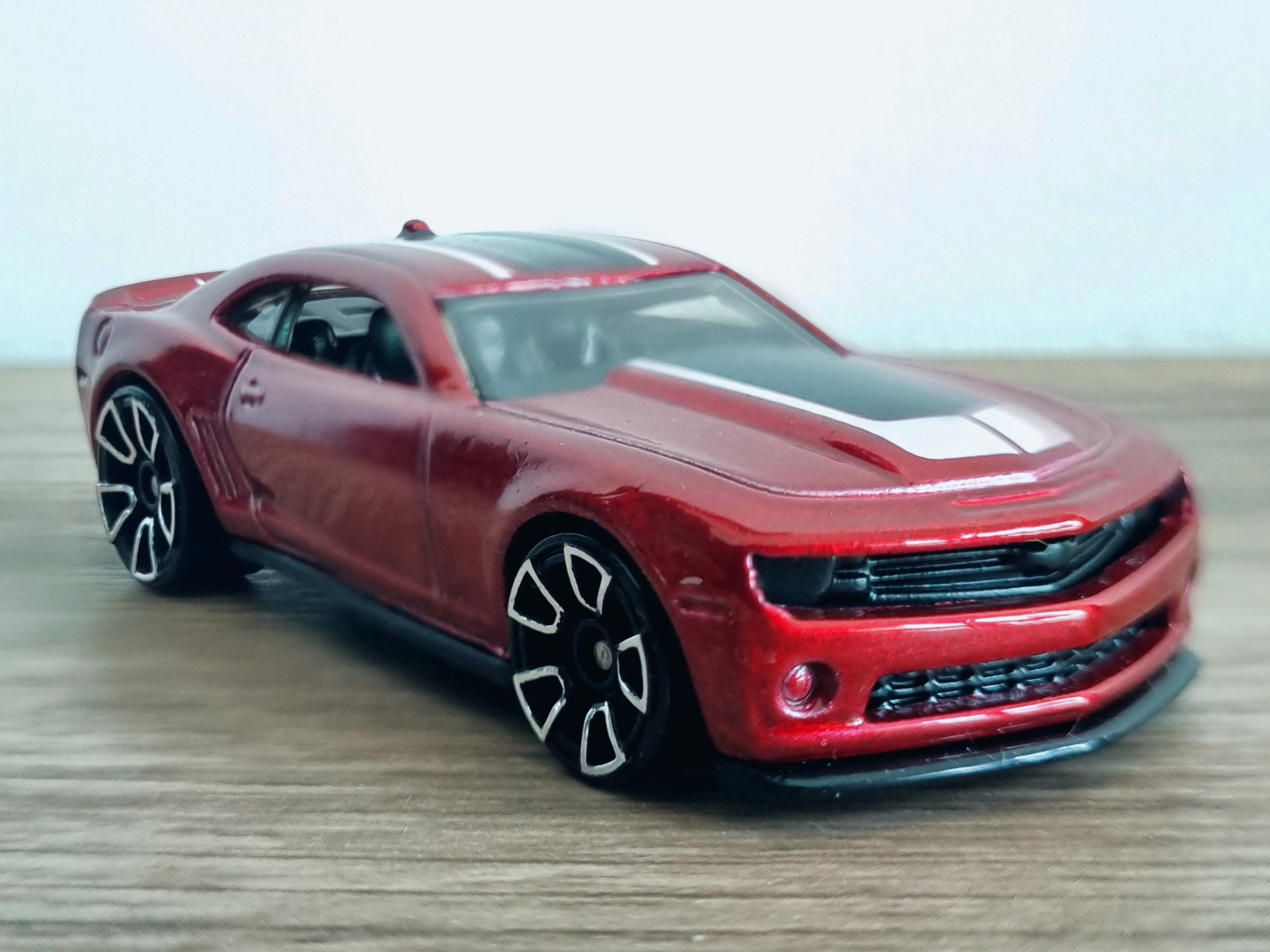
A 2013 Team Hot Wheels Chevy Camaro (not the GM Version)

General Motors also released a special Chevrolet Camaro Hot Wheels Edition, which was a blue convertible that offered various Hot-Wheels-themed decorations throughout the car.

2014 saw 250 mainstream cars released with similar segments to 2013. Various playsets and other non-car merchandise were also released this year. 2014 also marked the end of the license agreement between Mattel and Ferrari (the licensing was eventually renewed in 2025), meaning the 2014 release of Ferrari 5 Pack would be the last for Mattel, and the 2015 black Ferrari 599XX was the last Ferrari model appearing in mainstream, both regular model and its Treasure Hunt variant.

2016 lineup was similar to 2015 and 2014 in terms of segments, and the design of the card was overhauled. Some car names were TBD (To Be Determined) or 2016 (Coming Soon). They're now divided into mini collections with their corresponding segments and their icons printed on the card. Some of them include HW Showroom, BMW (100th anniversary of BMW), HW Screen Time (Cars and characters seen on television, video games, and movies), and HW Snow Stormers. New models include the Cruise Bruiser, Side Ripper, Grass Chomper, and the '16 Acura NSX, while other models first see their release in the mainline series, such as the '52 Hudson Hornet.

=== 2017–2021 ===
2017 saw a major change in casting numbering. Since that moment, recolors are named with a different number than the original, thus causing the number limit of cars to expand to 365. The idea of numbering a casting with a number corresponding to their own series was also aborted. There were also some new mainline series introduced, such as Experimotors (cars with moving parts, or a secondary purpose), Holiday Racers (cars that have a holiday based theme), Factory Fresh (a series including newer, sometimes older castings with fabric painting) and Camaro Fifty (a series dedicated to the Chevrolet Camaro, and its 50th anniversary).

In 2018, Hot Wheels celebrated its 50th anniversary. The style of the blister cards were changed again, depicting a city in the background of the car, thus emulating a "Hot Wheels City" theme. For that year, each blister card had a 50th Anniversary logo. Hot Wheels also launched several collector-focused lines for that year, including Favorites, which was a series that consisted of 11 highly detailed vehicles (which were based on real cars), all with metal bodies and rubber tires. For this year, Hot Wheels also launched a display case, which could hold up to 48 cars, and could either stand up on its own (via attachable "feet") or be mounted on a wall. Each display case came with an exclusive car.

On October 4, 2018, Mattel filed a new trademark for the motto it's not the same without the flame. In 2019, a seal was added in the bottom left corner of the blister card with the motto.

On February 18, 2021, the Hot Wheels Mars Perseverance Rover was released; a die-cast scale model latest vehicle in its Space mini-collections inspired by the NASA-launched Perseverance rover.

Hot Wheels designer Ryu Asada died on March 23, 2021, at age 42, after years of suffering from cancer. That same year, Hot Wheels began a partnership with Milestone S.r.l. to release their first game, Hot Wheels Unleashed, which came out on September 30, 2021.

=== 2022–present ===
On 7 March 2023, NBC ordered a reality competition series known as Hot Wheels: Ultimate Challenge with Rutledge Wood as host. It which premiered on 30 May 2023.

Netflix announced a new animated series adaptation, Hot Wheels Let's Race, on 28 September 2023, which premiered on 4 March 2024.

On 9 October 2024, Formula One announced a new multi-year partnership with Hot Wheels. The partnership began in 2024 with the release of a Hot Wheels F1 car, before the full range of F1 products were later released in 2025.

In 2025, Mattel announced the development of a live-action Hot Wheels feature film by Mattel Studios and Warner Bros. The film will be produced by JJ Abrams' Bad Robot Productions, and will be directed by Jon M. Chu from a screenplay by Juel Taylor and Tony Rettenmaier.

== Hot Wheels Legends Tour ==
Starting in 2018, Hot Wheels launched a new program called the Hot Wheels Legends Tour. This program was originally launched to commemorate Hot Wheels's 50th anniversary. Each year, there are 18 Legends Tour events that are held at various Walmart locations across the United States. Over 111,000 people attend and about 5,000 cars are entered at those events. At each event, one car is picked to be recreated as a potential new Hot Wheels casting. After all the events for that year conclude, one finalist is then picked to be the winner, and their car then gets recreated as a new Hot Wheels casting next year. Hot Wheels are looking for vehicles that embody the fun and creative spirit of Hot Wheels, which is their main selling point.

=== Hot Wheels Legends Tour winners ===
- 2018: Custom built "2JetZ", built by Luis Rodriguez
- 2019: 1957 Nash Metropolitan "The Nash" (Note: The car was named "Nashole", but was simply named as "The Nash" due to the car naming being offensive.), built by Greg Salzillo and Dave Ford
- 2020: 1970 Pontiac Trans Am, built by Riley Stair.
- 2021: 1969 Volvo P1800 "Ain't No Saint", built by Lee Johnstone.
- 2022: 1992 Autozam Scrum "Texas Toot", built by Craig Meaux
- 2023: 1990 Mazda MX-5 Roadster "Chimera", built by Chris Watson
- 2024: Custom 1968 Ford Falcon "La Liebre", built by Giuseppe Casagrande and Maurizio Moschini
- 2025: 1990 Fiat 126p "Delta XS", built by Paweł Czarnecki

== Collectibles ==
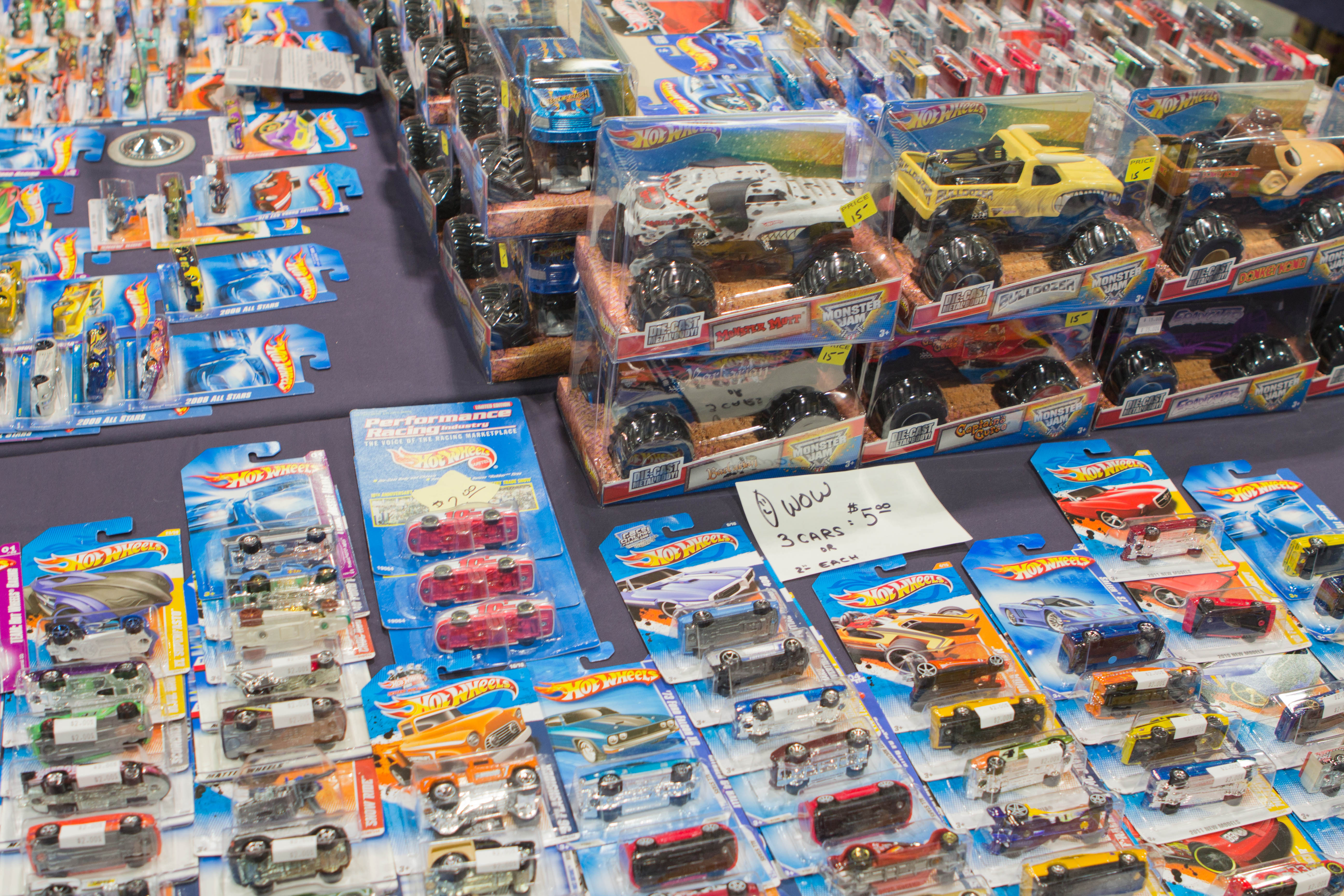
An assortment of various Hot Wheels cars

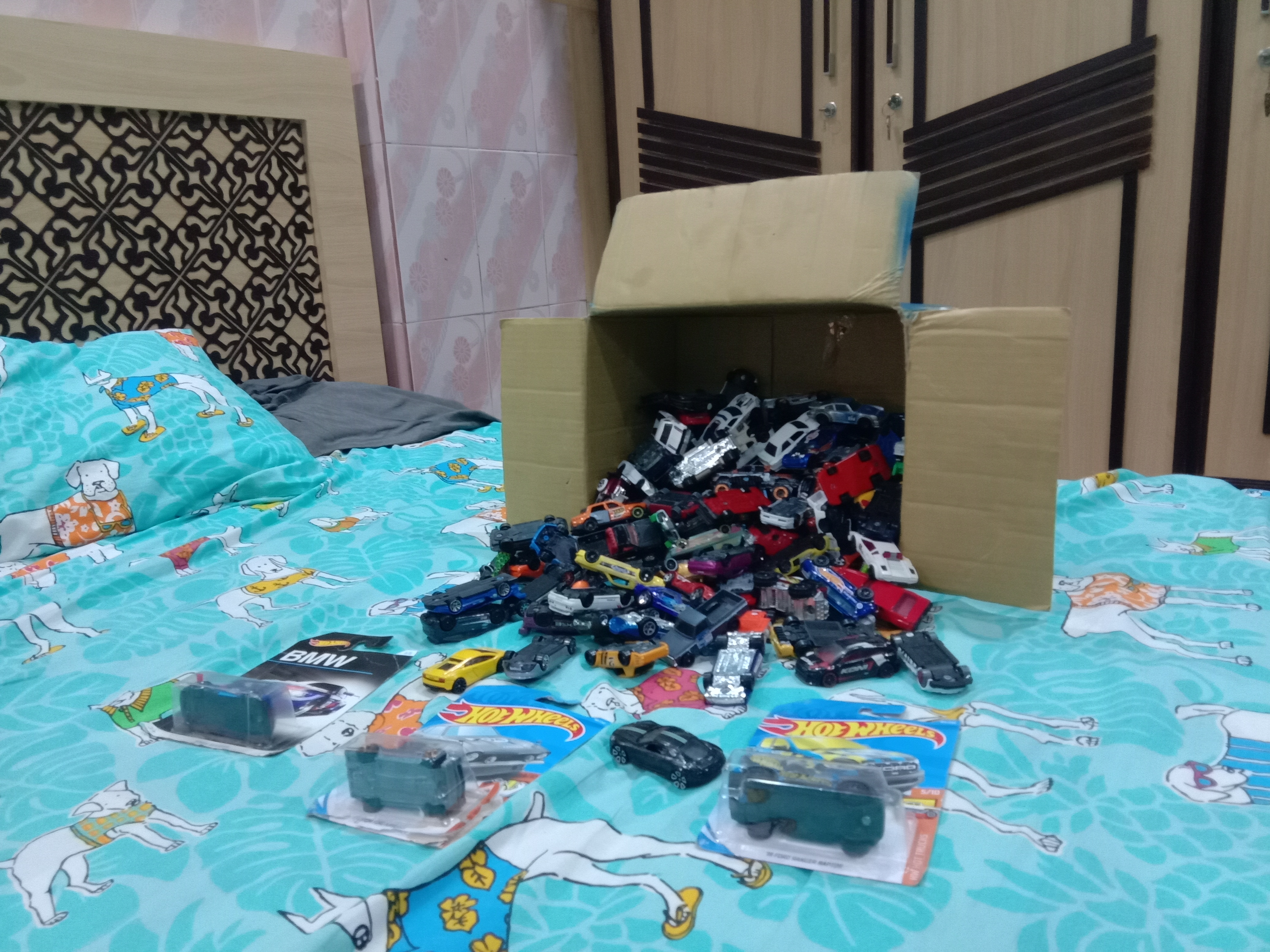
A box full of Hot Wheels cars

Through the years, Hot Wheels cars have been collected mostly by children. However, since the late 1990s, there has been an increase in the number of adult collectors. Mattel estimates that 41 million children grew up playing with the toys, the average collector has over 1,550 cars, and children between the ages of 5 and 15 have an average of 41 cars. Most believe the collecting craze started with the Treasure Hunts in 1995. Mike Strauss has been called the father of Hot Wheels collecting; he has organized two collectors' events each year in some form since 1986. The first event was the Annual Hot Wheels Collectors Convention, normally held each year in the fall. The convention occurred in various locations around the country until 2001, when the first Annual Hot Wheels Collectors Nationals was put together. Since then, the Conventions are held each year in southern California. The Hot Wheels Collectors Nationals rotate among cities outside of California during the spring. Strauss has also published the quarterly Hot Wheels Newsletter since 1986 and was one of the first to unite collectors all over the world. He also writes Tomart's Price Guide to Hot Wheels, a book listing history, car descriptions and values. Strauss sold his collection in 2011 and retired from the Hot Wheels Newsletter.

Mainline Hot Wheels cars retailed for about US$0.97–$1.08 until the early 2020s, rising to approximately US$1.25 by the mid-2020s. The price has not changed much in almost 40 years, although in real terms the price has dropped significantly, since a Hot Wheels car cost $0.98 in 1968. After the cars are no longer available at retail the cost can vary significantly. A common car may sell for less than retail, while some of the rarer cars can sell for many hundreds or even thousands of dollars. The highest price paid for a Hot Wheels car was close to $70,000 in 2000 for a pre-production version of a Volkswagen Rear Loader Beach Bomb (the asking price was $72,000). The Beach Bomb is a VW microbus with a pair of surfboards poking out the rear window. This design failed initial testing, proving to be top-heavy and not functional with the Power Booster track accessory. A widened version with the surfboards mounted in side slots was designed and released for the 1969 model year, making the "rear loader" version a rarity and very sought-after piece. As of 2018, there are about 50 "rear loaders" known to exist.

=== Dates on cars ===
The date on the base of a Hot Wheels car (Example: ©2008 Mattel) is the copyright date for the casting of the car, not a production date or release year. The date is usually the year before the car was first released, but not always. For example, a car in the 2001 First Editions series called Evil Twin, was released in 2001 but the year dated on the bottom of the car is 2000. Sometimes, the copyright will be the same year as the casting's first release. This usually happens with cars released toward the end of a model year.

There are a few cases where the copyright is several years before a car's first release. The copyright date will usually not change through the lifetime of a casting. For example, the Twin Mill, first released in 1969, still had a 1969 copyright date on the 2019 mainline releases of the car. If the tooling for a car has a major change at some point in its life, the copyright date might be changed or amended to reflect the change. For example, Quick Bite, first released in 1984 as the Good Humor Truck, had a tooling update before 2018, so its date reads 1983, '17 on the base of the 2018 release.

There are a few exceptions where the copyright date applies only to the base of a car instead of to the entire car. Those exceptions are mostly funny car castings where the same base was used with various different bodies over the years.

Since 2008, Hot Wheels cars have had a code stamped or printed on the base. This is a "base code". This base code can be used to identify exactly when an individual car was produced in the Hot Wheels factory. The code begins with a letter, followed by a two-digit number. The letter for the year 2008 was "A". The letter is then followed by two numbers, which represent the week of that particular year the car was manufactured. For example, a car with the date stamp of "A52" was produced on the fifty-second week of 2008.

Some cars have 4-digit date codes on the base. These date codes are more specific than the 3-digit codes as they indicate the day a car was made instead of just the week. For the 4-digit codes, the first 3 digits indicate the day of the year and the last digit is the year. A date code of 1987 would indicate the car was made on the 198th day of 2017 (July 17). A code of 0250 would be the 25th day of 2010 (or 2020; depending on the car).

Date codes only indicate when a specific car was made. They do not necessarily reflect the model release year of a particular car. Mainline production changes to the next model year right around the middle of the calendar year at the end of June/beginning of July. Premiums and other special series lines often run later in the calendar year before changing production to the next year.

== Hot Wheels Classics ==
The Hot Wheels Classics line was an immediate hit with enthusiasts everywhere. The new line focused on muscle cars, hot rods, and other offbeat vehicles (such as a go-kart, a motor home and even an airplane), many from the company's first ten years (1968–78) of production. The series is also used to debut several different castings, such as the 1965 Chevy Malibu or the 1972 Ford Ranchero.

Series 1 from 2005 consisted of 25 models, each with all-metal body and chassis, decked out with Spectraflame paint, in packages similar to those used from 1968 to 1972. Each car had a retail price of about three to four dollars (USD) and each of the 25 cars were released with 7 or 8 different colors. Models included the 1957 Chevy Bel Air (pictured at the right), the 1963 Ford T-Bird, and the 1965 Pontiac GTO.

There were also track sets in similar retro packaging, and 1:18 scale Hot Wheels Classics. The Classics version of the Purple Passion was released with Real Riders tires at San Diego Comic-Con. Mattel also produced a Classics Olds 442 in Spectraflame blue for the 2005 Toy Fair.

In late 2005, Series 2 now consisted of 30 models including the 1967 Camaro Convertible, the 1969 Dodge Charger, and a 1965 Mustang GT. There was also supposed to be a separate Mustang Funny Car (as listed on the blisterpack rear checklist) but this was apparently changed to a Plymouth Barracuda Funny Car during production.

In 2006, a Series 3 line of Classics was introduced, again containing 30 models with multiple colors of each vehicle. Models included the '69 Pontiac Firebird, a Meyers Manx dune buggy, and the Richard Petty '70 Plymouth "Superbird".

In 2007, Series 4 debuted with just fifteen models. In recognition of the 40th anniversary there were two packaging versions available - models came with a collectible metal badge (featuring a portrait of the involved vehicle) or were sold alone as in the previous three series. Models included a VW Karmann Ghia, a '68 Mercury Cougar, and the "Red Baron" hot rod. For its 40th anniversary in 2008, Hot Wheels celebrated the making of its four billionth car with the production of a diamond-studded model worth US$140,000. It had 2,700 diamond chips, a total of almost 23 karats, and was cast in white gold, with rubies serving as taillights.

In 2009, Series 5 has 30 models. For the first time, there are chase cars in the classics series. These cars feature Real Riders rubber tires. A few models included are Copper Stopper, 1970 Pontiac GTO, and Hammer Sled.

== Special model lines ==
Hot Wheels has also released slightly larger, more detailed models, such as the original Gran Toros (1/43 scale) from 1970, and the Dropstars line, a model line of "blinged" cars. Also in this larger scale are the HIN (Hot Import Nights), G-Machines and Customs lines. These lines were introduced in 2004–2005.

Hot Wheels has produced many replica scale models in the industry standard 1/43, 1/24 and 1/18 scales. In 2004, it released a 1/12 scale replica of the C6 Corvette.

Hot Wheels also in the early 1990s introduced a series known as the California Customs. A line of cars that had a California theme.

Other lines from Hot Wheels include: R-R-Rumblers & Chopcycles (motorcycles introduced in 1971), Hotbirds (metal airplanes), Sizzlers, XV Racers, Hot Tunerz and Stockerz.

Over the years, Mattel has also teamed up with other retail organizations to produce special models available through those retailers. The list of retailers includes Avon, Chuck E. Cheese, Dinty Moore, FAO Schwarz, Full Grid, General Mills, Getty, HEB, Hills, Hormel, Hughes Family Markets, JC Penney, JC Whitney, Kay-Bee Toys, K-Mart, Kellogg's, Kool-Aid, Kroger, Lexmark, Liberty Promotions (contracted the series of special models for Jiffy Lube and Penske), Little Debbie Snacks, Malt-O-Meal, McDonald's, Mervyn's, Otter Pops, Rose's Discount Stores, Shell, Target, Tony's Pizza, Toys "R" Us, Union 76, Valvoline, Van de Kamp's, Walmart, and White's Guide to Collecting, as well as several Major League Baseball franchises to name a few.

In 2016, Hot Wheels released a special collection for the 50th anniversary of the Beatles' 1966 song "Yellow Submarine." The collections includes five cars, a VW microbus and a yellow submarine.

=== Made by other companies ===
In some cases, Hot Wheels dies have been sold or acquired by other companies once Mattel has finished using them. One example involved early dies that made their way to Argentina and were reproduced as Mukys, though not with spectra-flame paints or the same quality as seen in Mattel's products.

=== Hot Wheels Elite and Hot Wheels Mattel ===
Hot Wheels has spin-off series named Hot Wheels Elite and Hot Wheels Mattel, respectively. The Elite Hot Wheels are 1:18, 1:43 and 1:50 highly detailed diecast, the majority of them being based on Ferraris. They are more expensive than the Mattel models which aren't as highly detailed. The Elite versions are licensed by Ferrari. The Hot Wheels Elite series have a "mini" series which can be seen on the website. Two of the popular limited 1:18 Hot Wheels Elite series' are the Ferrari in Music and Cult Classics. The music series features singers' and rappers' Ferraris, including Jamiroquai's Jay Kay's Black Enzo Ferrari.

=== Car Culture ===
In 2016, Hot Wheels started a new line of Collector's models, in a line called Car Culture. Car Culture is Hot Wheels' line of Premium 1:64 models with metal bodies and bases, two-piece wheels with rubber tires, and more detailed decorations. Intended for adult collectors primarily, these models retail for roughly 6-7 times the cost of a mainstream 1:64 Hot Wheels model. These cars retail for over three times the retail price of a "basic" car, and are produced in significantly fewer numbers.

This line debuted with the release of "Japan Historics", a set of five Japanese sports cars. Every year at least four more sets are introduced. All Car Culture sets have five cars, and often have new castings created for the sets. The number five spot in the set is usually reserved for the newest casting in the set. Car Culture cars are typically based on real automobiles; however in 2018, Hot Wheels introduced a set called "Team Transport", which included some fantasy truck castings.

The fact that some of the trucks are unlicensed allows the castings to be universally used in any Team Transport set regardless of theme (for example, a Chevrolet-branded truck would not make sense in a Ford-themed set). Although "Team Transport" is labeled under the Car Culture line, they are a separate category of Car Culture vehicles than the usual 5-car sets, possessing different barcodes and prices.

In 2018, for Hot Wheels' 50th Anniversary, Car Culture card sizes were increased, along with the amount of decorations on the cars. A Hot Wheels "50th anniversary" logo was also placed beside the set's name on the packaging.

== Treasure Hunt series ==
Treasure Hunt (sometimes called T-Hunt) is a line of Hot Wheels cars, introduced by Mattel in 1995. It consisted of 12 cars every year (15 beginning in 2011). The original production run was 10,000 of each car worldwide; that number has since risen due to the increasing demand for Hot Wheels as a collector's item.

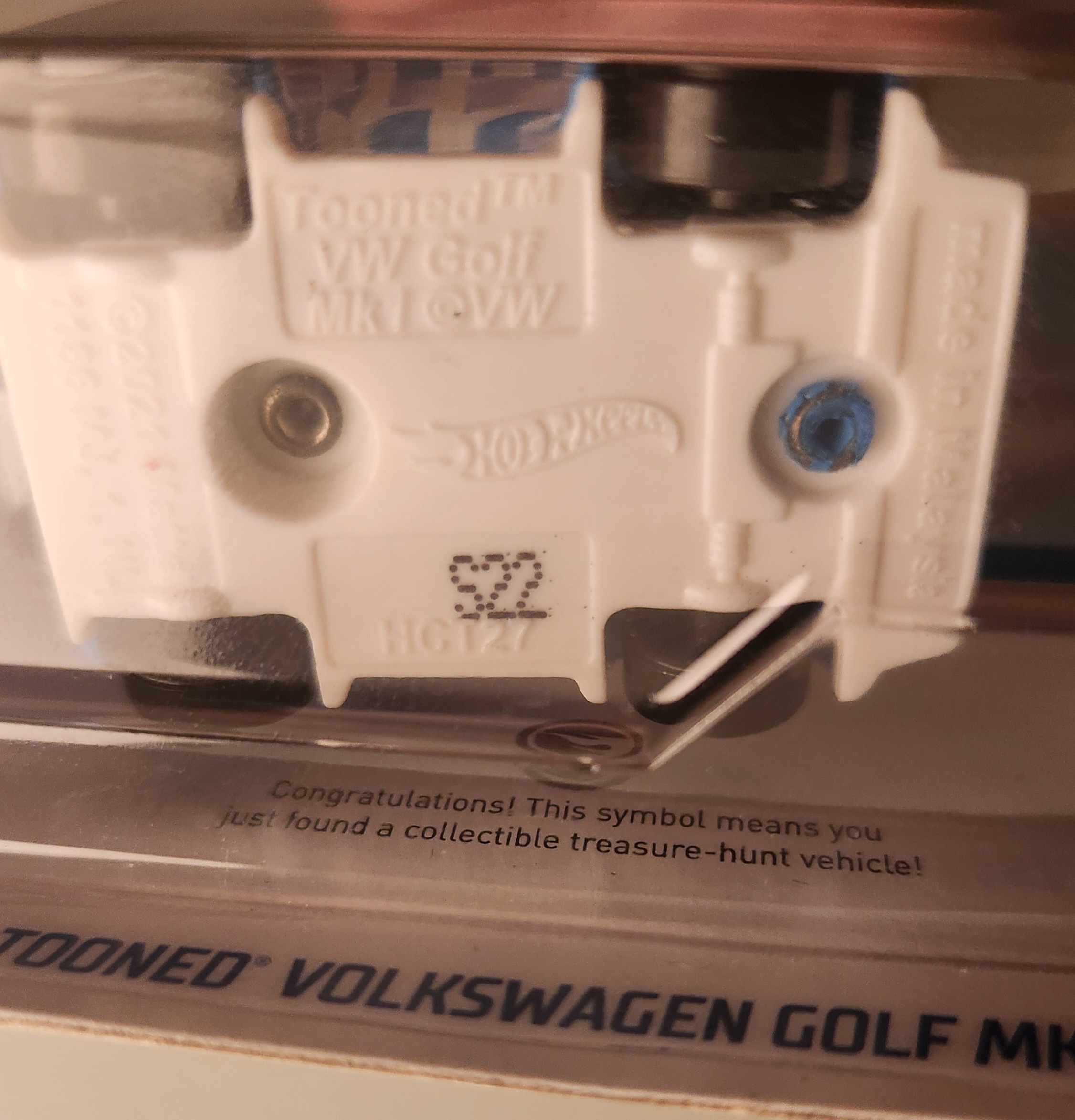
The Treasure Hunt congratulatory message hidden behind the model inside the packaging

Treasure Hunt vehicles are identifiable by a circle flame logo placed somewhere on the vehicle and on the card right behind the car.

Treasure Hunt vehicles used to be identifiable by a label on the package. The blister card said "Treasure Hunt" or "T-Hunt" on a green bar, sometimes with an illustration of a treasure chest. Since 2013, Treasure Hunts do not have the green stripe anymore; instead, the cars are recognizable with a "flame in a circle logo" on the vehicle and behind it on the card. The cars were decorated with flashy designs and special "rubber" wheels before 2007.

In 2007, Mattel introduced a two-tiered Treasure Hunt system. A regular Treasure Hunt will feature normal enamel paint and normal wheels like other Hot Wheels cars. The production of these is rumored to be greater than previous T-Hunts. Super Treasure Hunts are much harder to find. Like Treasure Hunts of the past, a Super Treasure Hunt features premium wheels and Spectraflame paint, as well as (starting in 2015), a golden-colored circle-flame logo printed on the card behind the car.

Many Hot Wheels collectors have noticed in recent times that the US Basic mixes are more likely to have a Super Treasure Hunt in them compared to International Mixes. Before 2013, all 12 Treasure Hunt cars of a year were released in both regular and super versions. In 2012, Super Treasure Hunts came with special paint and wheels, but with series designation on the card. However, the regular T-hunts retained a special T-Hunt series card. Mattel stopped using special cards for all Treasure Hunts in 2013.

Some U.S. releases in 2014 had the phrase "This symbol on the vehicle lets you know it is hard to find and highly collectible". In 2016, this was changed to "Congratulations! This symbol means you just found a collectible treasure-hunt car!". This would be under a silver flame logo on the card for T-Hunts. In 2015, Supers featured a gold logo on the card. Generally, Hot Wheels has targeted both kids and adults with the T-Hunt series, focusing more on the adult collecting market with Supers.

== Live-action film adaptation ==
In January 2003, Columbia Pictures announced they had gained exclusive rights to developing a feature film based on the toy line Hot Wheels with McG attached to direct. Although unwritten, the premise involved a young man "trying to reconcile with his father. It's a kid who steals his dad's racecar and ends up going through a sort of Back to the Future portal into this world, and he has to reconcile his relationship with his father." In 2006, McG said that he dropped out as director and chose to produce instead. The film was to be produced by Columbia Pictures, Flying Glass of Milk Films and Silver Pictures, under license to Mattel.

In 2009, with no recent developments, the film was put into turnaround, and the rights were handed over to Warner Bros. Pictures. Joel Silver took over producing with Matt Nix writing the script.

In June 2011, it was announced that Legendary Pictures was developing a film based on Hot Wheels due to the success of Fast Five by developing an edgier film. In July 2013, Simon Crane and Juan Carlos Fresnadillo were named as the frontrunners to direct the film, with Art Marcum and Matt Holloway writing the film, intended to be more Mission: Impossible than Fast and Furious. In September 2016, Justin Lin signed on to direct the film, which will be produced through his production company Perfect Storm Entertainment.

In August 2017, Lin revealed that the film was still in development. It was speculated that the film would be released as an animated direct sequel to 2003's Hot Wheels: World Race and receive additional animation development from Playground Games who had previously collaborated with Mattel to release an expansion for the video game Forza Horizon 3. However the option expired and returned to Mattel.

In late January 2019, Mattel Films and Warner Bros. Pictures agreed to partner on a Hot Wheels film. It was announced on September 25, 2020, by The Hollywood Reporter that Warner Bros. has hired Neil Widener and Gavin James to write the film.

On April 25, 2022, it was announced that Bad Robot would produce the film. On January 23, 2023, Dalton Leeb and Nicholas Jacobson-Larson were announced to write the film. On July 7, 2025, Jon M. Chu was attached to direct. Juel Taylor and Tony Rettenmaier were also hired to work on the script.

== Sizzlers ==
The Sizzlers were a 1970s Hot Wheels spin off with a built-in motor and a tiny rechargeable battery. (The X-V racers of the 1990s were similar.) They were introduced in 1970 and became immediately popular. Sizzlers run on the regular "orange" Hot Wheels track, and Mattel created special race sets with U-Turns, multi-level spirals and loops to take advantage of the cars' electric motor. Two lane race sets such as the California/8 race set were developed that allowed Sizzlers to race side-by side, until Mattel created the black Fat Track which is three lanes wide with steep banked curves and designed to allow Sizzlers to run free.

In action, Sizzlers supposedly display a unique, competitive "passing action" when running on the Fat Track, as if each car were piloted by an impatient driver trying to jockey ahead of the rest. The Fat Track sets included the "Big O", "California 500", and "Super Circuit" race sets, and accessories such as the "Scramble Start" (a four-car starting gate), "Lap Computer" four car lap counter, and "Race-Timer" stop watch.

Six cars were made in 1970, 12 cars were made in 1971, and 4 cars were made in 1972. The "Fat Daddy" Sizzlers (oversized bodies with huge tires) were introduced in 1973. Mattel put the Sizzlers on a hiatus after that year, and in 1976 they created Sizzlers II. That next year, the Night Ridin' Sizzlers (which had headlights you could turn on or off) were created. Mattel permanently stopped Sizzlers production in 1978. They were replaced by another spin off named Scorchers. The Scorchers were "pull back" cars which wound a clock spring when pulled backwards a short distance, which then propelled them forward for several feet.

Sizzlers are charged with four or two D battery chargers called the Juice Machine and Goose Pump respectively. Later, the Power Pit was introduced—which was an electric charger that plugged into any household AC outlet and resembled a race track garage or pit stop. A 90-second charge of the tiny internal NiCad battery gives up to five minutes of useful run time. It was claimed by advertisers that the 90-second charge time was "the longest minute and a half in a kid's life" as they waited impatiently for the car to charge sufficiently to get back into the race.

The Sizzler electric technology spun off into the Hotline Trains, which ran on track similar to regular Hot Wheels, and the Earthshakers construction vehicles. Both lines of vehicles were charged using the Sizzler Juice Machine or Power Pit.

In the 1990s, Mattel's trademark on the "Sizzlers" name had lapsed and toy company Playing Mantis released a new Sizzlers line based around NASCAR stock car models and copied the Fat Track as the "Stocker 400" and "Mach 500" track sets to capitalize on the booming popularity of NASCAR in that decade. The Juice Machine was renamed the "Mega-Charger" and incorporated a more efficient "trickle charge" rather than the "dump charge" of the original machines.

Interest in the toys began to increase once again. They were taken off the market after Mattel filed a lawsuit against Playing Mantis. Sizzlers returned again in 2006, when Mattel struck an exclusive deal with Target stores to re-release Sizzlers cars, the "Big O" Fat track, Juice Machine and car carrying case—all in the original packaging from the 1970s. As of January 2009, the Sizzlers line has been discontinued by Target.

In 2011, Sizzlers were re-released as Cars 2 characters, and were sold at Target stores. This line was called Charge Ups and released under the Mattel brand name but not as part of the Hot Wheels line.

== Promotion and sponsorships ==
Hot Wheels appeared in the 2016 Macy's Thanksgiving Day Parade.

=== Motorsports ===
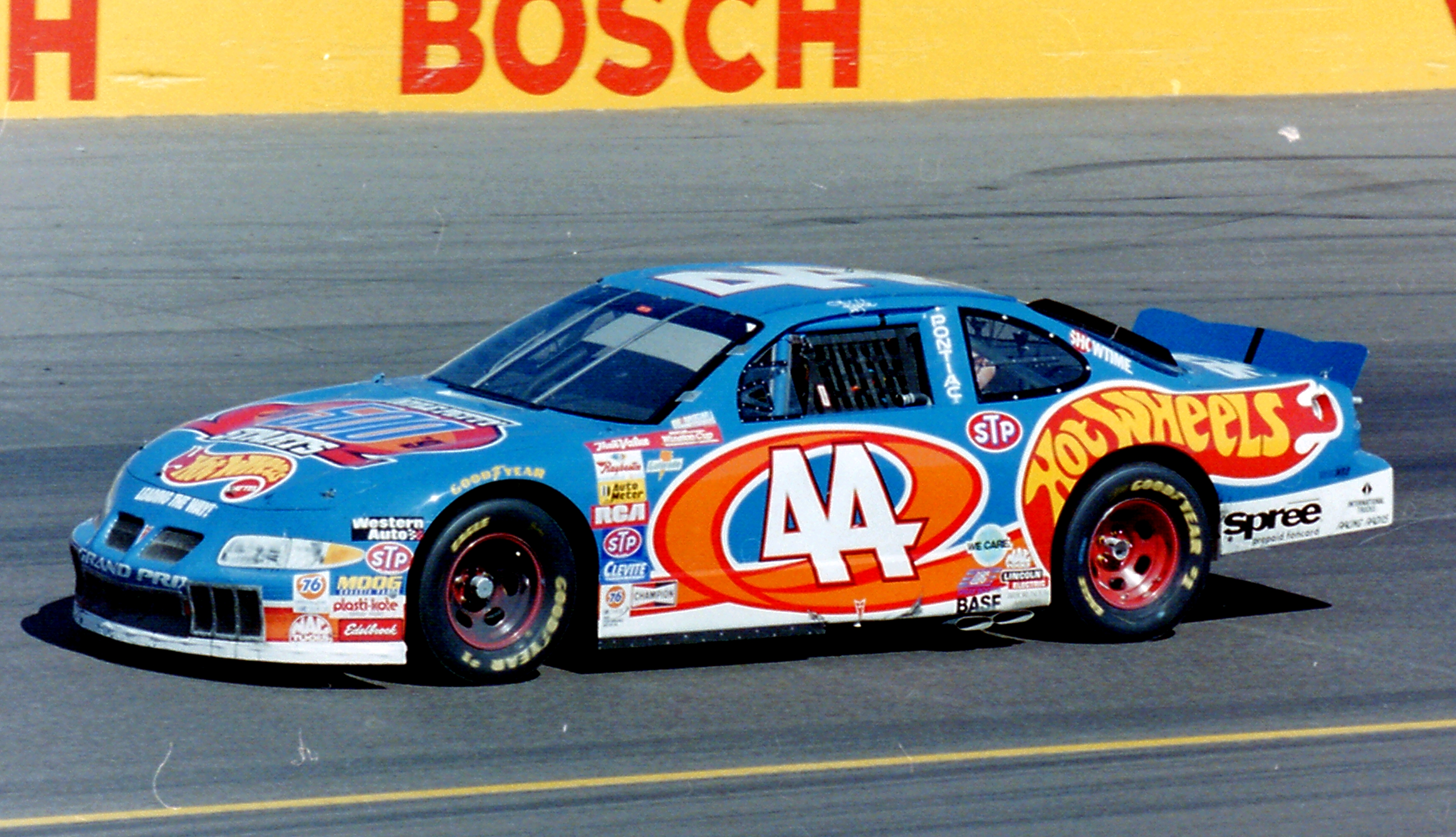
The Hot Wheels-sponsored car of Kyle Petty in 1997

Starting in 1970, professional drag racers Don Prudhomme ("The Snake") and Tom McEwen ("The Mongoose") were sponsored by Hot Wheels, and later on, Hot Wheels created the Snake and Mongoose Drag Set in 1970. Later somewhere in 1972, the second versions of both driver's self-titled funny cars were released, when McEwen had the Mongoose 2, and Prudhomme had the Snake 2. The drag set remained the same. Then, Hot Wheels made rail-type dragster versions of them, based on the actual funny cars and was featured in the Wild Wheelie Set. Later in Hot Wheels' lifespan, the normal drag set with Snake and Mongoose were still being produced. The latest set with the Snake and Mongoose is in the Drag-Strip Demons lineup.

In 1970, Hot Wheels sponsored Trans-Am Series driver Dan Gurney and his All American Racers car. In 1992, Hot Wheels sponsored the Trans-Am car of Jack Baldwin as he went on to win that year's championship. Hot Wheels signed a sponsorship deal in 1997 with NASCAR driver Kyle Petty and the No. 44 PE2 Motorsports car and thus began making replicas of NASCAR stock cars. Three years later, Hot Wheels joined the Craftsman Truck Series team of Carlos Contreras and the No. 12 truck.

In 2004, Hot Wheels sponsored the No. 99 car of Jeff Burton for one race at Darlington Raceway. Six years later, the company returned to NASCAR to sponsor the No. 7 JR Motorsports car of Danica Patrick at Michigan International Speedway. Hot Wheels made another one-off sponsorship in 2021 for NASCAR driver Jade Buford's No. 48 Big Machine Racing Team car at Darlington Raceway; Buford's paint scheme for the race was modeled after Gurney's Trans-Am car.

In 1999, Hot Wheels partnered with five Formula One teams to manufacture scale model Formula One cars. In 2016, Hot Wheels opened the Race to Win exhibit at The Children's Museum of Indianapolis to promote the 100th Indianapolis 500.

From 1999 to 2018, Hot Wheels had a Monster Jam license to release monster truck diecasts and field a Hot Wheels-themed truck in the real-life shows. The partnership ended in 2019 after Feld Entertainment signed a new ten year toy licensing deal with Spin Master for Monster Jam, diecast production stopped and the Hot Wheels team retired. Soon after, Hot Wheels created the Hot Wheels Monster Trucks line and the Hot Wheels Monster Trucks Live show with the non-Monster Jam owned version of the Bigfoot truck as a competitor. Monster Jam claimed this as a plagiarism, causing controversy.

At the 2002 24 Hours of Le Mans, Hot Wheels logos appeared on the sidepods of the pair of MG-Lola EX257 prototypes entered by MG Sport & Racing.

Hot Wheels is a partner and sponsor of the Australian stunt rider Matt Mingay's Stuntz Inc team, and also sponsors him in the Stadium Super Trucks. After Mingay suffered serious facial injuries at the Detroit Belle Isle Grand Prix in 2016, Robby Gordon drove the No. 2 Hot Wheels truck at the Townsville Street Circuit. Hot Wheels and Castrol returned to support Mingay when he made his racing return in 2020.

=== Video games ===
Various video games based on Hot Wheels have been released for numerous consoles, PCs and mobile devices.

=== Pinball ===
A coin-operated pinball machine based on Hot Wheels cars and the Hot Wheels City YouTube series was released by American Pinball in June 2020.

== See also ==
- Model car
- Hotwheels sisyphus, a species of ground spider named for the brand
