= Five Stories (album) =

2001 studio album by Kris Delmhorst

Studio album by Kris Delmhorst
- Released: 2001
- Genre: Americana, Folk music
- Label: Big Bean, Signature Sounds/Catalyst Disc
- Producer: Kris Delmhorst, Billy Conway

Kris Delmhorst chronology
Appetite (1998)	Five Stories (2001)	Songs for a Hurricane (2003)

Five Stories is an album by singer/songwriter Kris Delmhorst. Delmhorst is a multi-instrumentalist who adds a full acoustic band to this release.

== Reception ==
Professional ratings
Review scores
Source	Rating
AllMusic	4/5 stars
Minor 7th	(favorable)

Allmusic stated that "Five Stories is a very satisfying album, sure to please fans and anyone who appreciates intelligent songwriters."

== Track listing ==
All songs by Kris Delmhorst unless noted.

1. "Cluck Old Hen" (Delmhorst, Traditional) – 3:17
2. "Damn Love Song" – 4:54
3. "Broken White Line" – 3:24
4. "Little Wings" – 3:03
5. "Words Fail You" - 5:52
6. "Just What I Meant" – 3:23
7. "Yellow Brick Road" – 3:43
8. "Garden Rose" – 4:43
9. "Mean Old Wind" – 2:29
10. "Honeyed Out" – 3:31
11. "Gave It Away" – 4:41
12. "Lullaby 101" – 3:00

== Personnel ==
- Kris Delmhorst - vocals, guitar, organ, cello
- Billy Conway - percussion, drums, vibraphone
- Sean Staples - banjo, guitar, mandolin, drums, percussion
- David Champagne - guitar
- Dana Colley - sax, Jew's-harp
- Cate Curtis - background vocals
- Tom Halter - flugelhorn
- Evan Harriman - organ
- Tim Kelly - Dobro
- Eric Roper - banjo
- Jennifer Kimball - background vocals, drums, percussion
- Andrew Mazzone - bass, drums, guitar
- Nolan McKelvey - bass, background vocals
- Lori McKenna - background vocals
- Dave Rizzuti - pedal steel guitar

== Production ==
- Produced by Kris Delmhorst and Billy Conway
- Engineered by Billy Conway
- Mastered by Jeff Lipton
- Design and photography by Kris Delmhorst and Megan Summers
