= Appetite (Kris Delmhorst album) =

Studio album by Kris Delmhorst
- Released: September 1998
- Genres: Americana, Folk music
- Label: Big Bean
- Producer: Alan Williams

Kris Delmhorst chronology
Appetite (1998)	Five Stories (2001)

Appetite is the debut album by singer/songwriter Kris Delmhorst, released in 1998.

== Track listing ==
All songs by Kris Delmhorst.

1. "Sleeping Dogs" – 4:21
2. "Weatherman" – 5:01
3. "Arm's Length" – 4:09
4. "Gravity" – 4:25
5. "World Gives You Wings" – 4:23
6. "North Dakota" – 4:00
7. "Sink or Swim" – 4:55
8. "Moscow Song" – 4:04
9. "Red Herring" – 3:12
10. "Open Road" – 4:24
11. "Summer Breeze" – 4:10

== Personnel ==
- Kris Delmhorst - vocals, guitar, viola, cello, percussion
- Billy Conway - percussion, drums
- Sean Staples - guitar, mandolin, background vocals
- Jabe "Charlie The Bubble Palantino" Beyer – harmonica, background vocals
- Ry Cavanaugh – harmonica, ukulele, background vocals
- Catie Curtis – guitar, background vocals
- Jeff Kearns – – guitar
- Joseph Kessler – fiddle
- Jennifer Kimball – guitar, background vocals
- Patty Larkin – guitar, bouzouki
- Michael Rivard – bass
- Dave Rizzuti – pedal steel guitar
- Alan Williams – organ

== Production ==
- Produced, engineered and mixed by Alan Williams
- Mastered by Henk Kooistra
- Design by Jim Infantino
- Photography by Kris Delmhorst, Ivan Sigal, Thomas Hoebbel and Charan Devereaux
