= Miles from the Lightning =

Studio album by Jeffrey Foucault
- Released: 2001
- Recorded: Nov 2000–Feb 2001
- Genre: Folk, Americana
- Label: Acoustic Roots
- Producer: Jeffrey Foucault

Jeffrey Foucault chronology
Miles from the Lightning (2001)	Stripping Cane (2004)

Miles from the Lightning is the debut album of singer/songwriter Jeffrey Foucault, released in 2001. It is a low-key album mainly consisting of ballads. He is joined by Peter Mulvey.

== Reception ==
Professional ratings
Review scores
Source	Rating
No Depression	(no rating)

Writing for No Depression, music critic Linda Ray called Foucault "the bard of small-town anywhere" and wrote of the album "Foucault delivers his plaintive poetry in the troubadour tradition... His insights are of the small, cold places in Wisconsin he calls home."

== Track listing ==
All songs by Jeffrey Foucault.

1. "Ballad of Copper Junction (A Journeyman's Lament)" – 5:08
2. "Dove and the Waterline" – 3:50
3. "Walking at Dusk (The Liberty Bell)" – 4:39
4. "Thistledown Tears" – 5:13
5. "Californ-I-A" – 4:29
6. "Highway and the Moon" – 6:37
7. "Battle Hymn (of the College Dropout Farmhand)" – 4:39
8. "Crossing Mississippi" – 4:20
9. "Secretariat" – 6:32
10. "Sunrise in the Rearview" – 5:04
11. "Street Light Halos" – 2:48
12. "Buckshot Moon" – 5:35
13. "I'm Alright" – 5:03
14. "Miles From the Lightning" – 3:20

== Personnel ==
- Jeffrey Foucault - acoustic guitar, vocals
- Peter Mulvey - guitar, lap steel guitar, background vocals

Production notes:

- Produced by Jeffrey Foucault
- Design by Eric Stein
- Photography by Eric Vandeveld and Mark Olson
- Recorded and mastered by Joel O’Neill
