= Harry Bentley Bradley =

American car designer (1939–2023)

- Born: May 25, 1939
- Died: May 13, 2023 (aged 83)
- Education: Pratt Institute
- Occupation: Car designer
- Employers: General Motors (1962–1966), Mattel (1966–1969)
- Known for: Hot Wheels
- Spouse: Joyce

Harry Bentley Bradley (May 25, 1939 – May 13, 2023) was an American car designer, best known for his work with Hot Wheels and the customizers Alexander Brothers. After retiring, he relocated with his wife Joyce to Northern California.

== Early life ==
Initially from La Jolla, California, Bradley grew up in Waban, Massachusetts. At age fourteen, he contracted polio and became totally paralyzed from the waist down. Harry spent seven months at Boston Children's Hospital learning how to live with his paralysis. He spent most of his free time drawing, benefiting from the time he had previously spent taking classes at Boston's Museum of Fine Arts.

Bradley attended the College of Wooster after which he wrote to General Motors asking about job opportunities and they responded by suggesting the industrial design program at Pratt Institute. While studying, Bradley started his own business as a custom design consultant and contributed to various publications such as Street Rodder, Customs Illustrated and Rod & Custom.

== Career ==
Bradley joined General Motors during his last semester at Pratt and moved to Detroit in July 1962. It was against company policy to publish designs for Hot Rod and Custom magazines while working for GM, so Harry continued to publish his design under the false name Mark Fadner. Soon after joining General Motors, Bradley met the Alexander Brothers and developed a relationship that would result in more than ten Bradley-designed custom cars over the next eight years, including the 1964 Alexa (credited by Alexander Bros. to Designer X) and the 1967 Dodge Deora, initially designed in 1964. At GM Bradley undertook a fellowship study program for a master's degree at Stanford University.

After only four years at GM, in 1966 Bradley moved to Mattel which allowed him to return to California. He designed a new range of die-cast model cars which were released in 1968 as Hot Wheels. Not expecting the models to be a success, he left Mattel in 1969 to start up his own company and also taught at the Art Center College of Design in Los Angeles.

Bradley died on May 13, 2023, at the age of 83.

== Designs ==
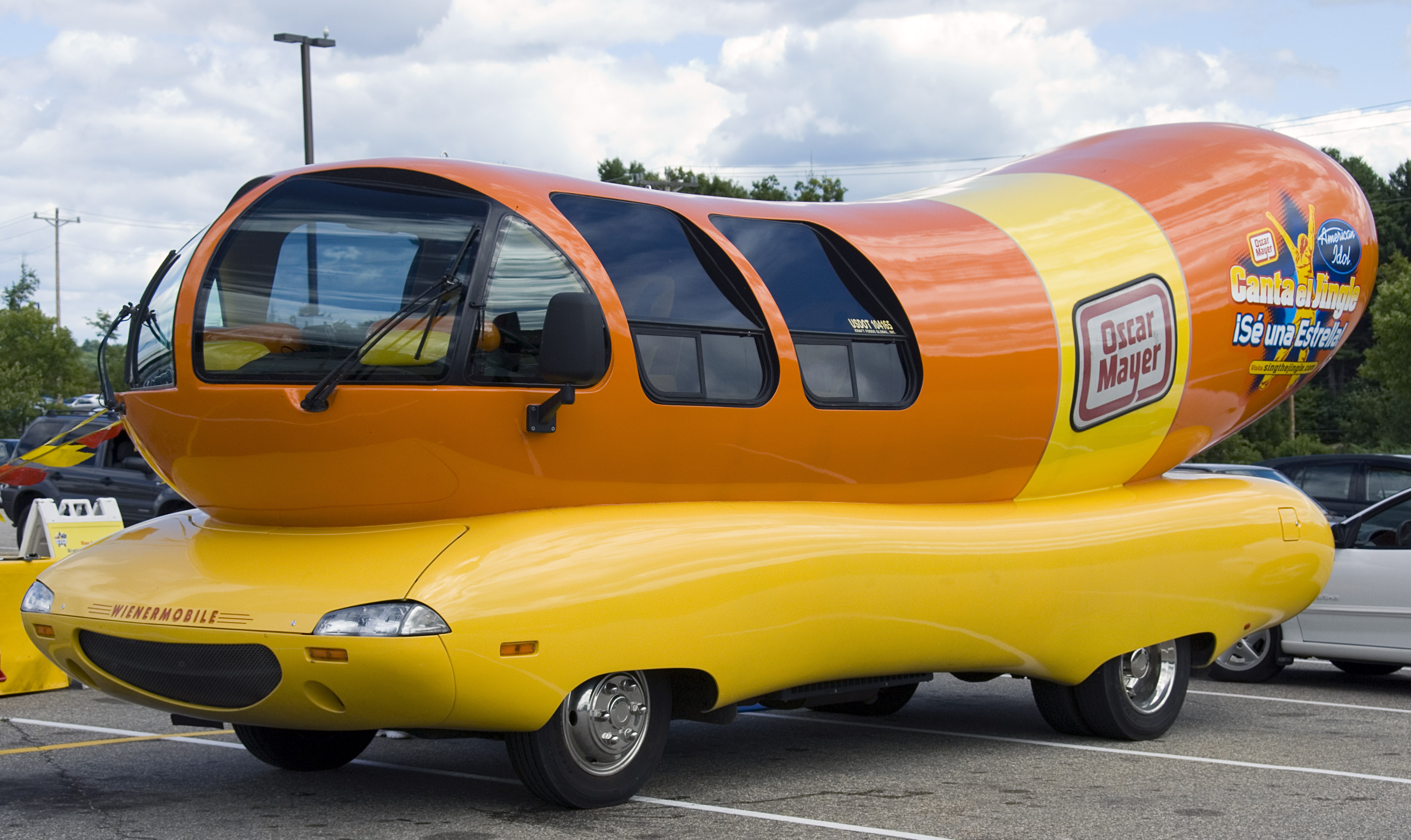
1995 Wienermobile

- Chevrolet La Jolla (1951), based on the Bel Air, owned and driven by Bradley
- Hot Wheels model cars (1968)
- Oscar Mayer Wienermobile (1995 version)
- Dodge Deora (1967)
