= Stripping Cane =

Studio album by Jeffrey Foucault
- Released: August 10, 2004
- Recorded: July 20–27, 2003
- Genre: Americana, folk
- Label: Signature Sounds
- Producer: David Goodrich

Jeffrey Foucault chronology
Miles from the Lightning (2001)	Stripping Cane (2004)	Ghost Repeater (2006)

Stripping Cane is the second solo album from American singer/songwriter Jeffrey Foucault, released in 2004.

== Reception ==
Professional ratings
Review scores
Source	Rating
Allmusic	4/5 stars
Minor 7th	(not rated)
No Depression	(no rating)

Writing for Allmusic, critic Jason McNeil wrote that "The thread that seems to hold this album so tightly is how Foucault paints a vivid vignette with simple turns of phrases, especially on the lovely toe-tapping "The Bluest Blade," a song that can't truly be appreciated after just one listen." David Kleiner of Minor 7th wrote Foucault's "sharply realized stories rise out of the darker side of the Appalachian tradition, murder ballads and lonesome love... the tunes are deep set in the sound of the mountains, stripped down front porch music just a mite rough: little flash, all atmosphere, finger picking six string, banjo, slide guitar, and mandolin fills... Because Foucault believes "what's beautiful is broken," "Stripping Cane" is relentlessly downbeat and almost relentlessly down tempo." Writing for No Depression, music critic Scott Brodeur wrote of the album "Musically, Foucault’s tunes bounce between the percussive guitar-picking blues of Chris Smither, the sparse songs of Greg Brown, and the acoustic playfulness of Leo Kottke... Lyrically, the songwriter’s plains poetry — he’s originally from southeastern Wisconsin — is filled with landscape similes and captivating tales of wanderlust and loss... Foucault is a bright young star on the Americana scene."

== Track listing ==
All songs by Jeffrey Foucault unless noted.

1. "Cross of Flowers" - 4:21
2. "Mayfly" - 3:34
3. "Doubletree" - 3:15
4. "Stripping Cane" - 4:25
5. "The Bluest Blade" - 3:24
6. "Pearl Handled Pistol" - 4:35
7. "Northbound 35" - 5:08
8. "4&20 Blues" - 2:58
9. "Don't Look for Me" - 3:05
10. "Tropic of Cancer" - 3:55
11. "Lodi" (John Fogerty) - 2:53
12. "Every New Leaf Over" - 3:57

== Personnel ==
- Jeffrey Foucault - acoustic guitar, banjo, vocals
- David Goodrich - guitar, banjo, slide guitar, mandolin, drums
- Kevin Barry - lap steel guitar
- Peter Mulvey - guitar, background vocals
- Anita Suhanin - background vocals
- Kris Delmhorst - background vocals, fiddle

Production notes:

- Produced by David Goodrich
- Mixed by David Goodrich and Mark Thayer
- Mastered by Bob St. John
- Design and photography by Jason Kruppa and Kris Delmhorst
