= Live at the Cafe Carpe =

Live album by Redbird
- Released: January 25, 2011
- Recorded: December 2008
- Genre: Americana, folk
- Length: 52:40
- Label: Signature Sounds

Redbird chronology
Redbird (2003)	Live at the Cafe Carpe (2011)

Live at the Cafe Carpe (or more completely Live at the Cafe Carpe: Fort Atkinson, Wisconsin, December 2008 & 2009) is a live recording by Redbird (Jeffrey Foucault, Kris Delmhorst and Peter Mulvey), released in 2011.

== Reception ==
Professional ratings
Review scores
Source	Rating
Allmusic	3.5/5 stars

Writing for Allmusic, critic William Ruhlman wrote that of the album, "In putting together a repertoire to play to live audiences, the trio sometimes risks coming off as a novelty act, however, as they get laughs for "What Made Milwaukee Famous (Has Made a Loser Out of Me)" and the group-written "Phonebooth of Love." Such numbers serve as light entertainment and changes of pace in a show, but don't work as well on repeated listenings of a disc. Still, the singers in Redbird have a workable concept for their group..."

== Track listing ==
1. "I'm Beginning to See the Light" (Duke Ellington, Don George, Johnny Hodges, Harry James) – 2:56
2. "Strangers" (Kris Delmhorst) – 3:18
3. "What Made Milwaukee Famous (Has Made a Loser Out of Me)" (Glenn Sutton) – 3:10
4. "Come All Ye Fair and Tender Ladies" (Traditional) – 5:37
5. "For the Turnstiles" (Neil Young) – 4:47
6. "Ships" (Greg Brown) – 3:20
7. "Snowed In" (David Goodrich) – 4:12
8. "Let the Mermaids Flirt with Me" (Mississippi John Hurt) – 3:01
9. "Silver Wings" (Merle Haggard) – 3:58
10. "Ooh La La" (Ronnie Lane, Ronnie Wood) – 3:33
11. "Phonebooth of Love" (Delmhorst, Jeffrey Foucault, Goodrich, Peter Mulvey, Barry Rothman) – 4:21
12. "Stewart's Coat" (Rickie Lee Jones) – 3:58
13. "Sad, Sad, Sad, Sad (And Far Away from Home)" (Mulvey) – 2:54
14. "4 & 20 Blues" (Foucault) – 3:35

== Personnel ==
- Kris Delmhorst - guitar, vocals
- Jeffrey Foucault - guitar, vocals
- Peter Mulvey - guitar, vocals
- David Goodrich - guitar

Production notes:

- Ian Kennedy – mastering
- David Goodrich – mixing
- Peter Mulvey – mixing
- Satchel Paige Welch – engineer
