= Salt as Wolves =

Studio album by Jeffrey Foucault
- Released: 16 October 2015
- Recorded: 2015, Pachyderm Studios
- Genre: Americana, Folk music
- Label: Blueblade Records
- Producer: Jeffrey Foucault, Bo Ramsey, Billy Conway

Jeffrey Foucault chronology
Cavalcade (2013)	Salt as Wolves (2015)	Blood Brothers (2018)

Salt as Wolves is the tenth album by American singer/songwriter Jeffrey Foucault, released in 2015. It debuted at number 7 in the Billboard Top Blues Album Chart for the week of November 7, 2015.

The planning of the album started when Foucault was in Iowa sharing the stage with The Pines, a Minneapolis-based group that included the sons of Bo Ramsey, who had produced Foucault's album Ghost Repeater. Ramsey sat in with the group and afterwards Foucault arranged for him to work on the recordings for Salt as Wolves. (The album title comes from the Shakespeare play Othello.) "Blues for Jessie Mae" is a tribute to blues singer Jessie Mae Hemphill.

== Reception ==
Professional ratings
Review scores
Source	Rating
The New York Times	(not rated)

Writing for The New York Times, critic Ben Ratliff wrote that "Foucault sings in a rich, textured, word-smearing voice about subjects of burned-out middle age: love, lying, regret, highways, hauntings, escape, aloneness, forgiveness, the value of a simple thing, the void without it." He called the album " immaculately tailored within a certain tradition... It is aesthetically informed up to the eyes. It sounds casual, but it can grow oppressive quickly.

== Track listing ==
All songs by Jeffrey Foucault unless otherwise noted.

1. "Des Moines" – 3:14
2. "Rico" – 4:12
3. "Left This Town" – 3:10
4. "I Love You (And You Are a Fool)" – 2:29
5. "Blues for Jessie Mae" – 3:53
6. "Slow Talker" – 3:57
7. "Jesus Will Fix It for You" (Jessie Mae Hemphill) – 4:41
8. "Oh Mama" – 4:20
9. "Hurricane Lamp" – 2:59
10. "Strange Heat and Thunder" – 3:15
11. "Paradise" – 3:17
12. "Take Your Time" (Foucault, Billy Conway) – 3:55

== Personnel ==
- Jeffrey Foucault – vocals, guitar
- Caitlin Canty – background and harmony vocals
- Billy Conway – drums
- Bo Ramsey – guitar
- Jeremy Moses Curtis – bass
