= Songs for a Hurricane =

Studio album by Kris Delmhorst
- Released: August 12, 2003
- Genre: Americana, Folk music
- Length: 49:44
- Label: Signature Sounds
- Producer: Kris Delmhorst, Billy Conway

Kris Delmhorst chronology
Five Stories (2001)	Songs for a Hurricane (2003)	Strange Conversation (2006)

Songs for a Hurricane is an album by singer/songwriter Kris Delmhorst, released in 2003.

== Reception ==
Professional ratings
Review scores
Source	Rating
Allmusic	3.5/5 stars

Music critic Joe Viglione wrote in his Allmusic "This artist is subtle in her approach with music that comes up behind you and a voice that breathes through the speakers... The production by Delmhorst and Billy Conway is commendable, and the different instruments by a host of musicians find their place, all the elements part of a fabric. The singer doesn't use her voice to command the album as most artists do, but there are textures here, flashes of lyrical brilliance with lap steel guitars, accordion, xylophone, fiddle, and cello weaving in and out... Captivating and very intriguing."

== Track listing ==
All songs by Kris Delmhorst unless noted.

1. "Waiting Under the Waves" – 3:38
2. "East of the Mountains" – 2:37
3. "You're No Train" – 5:35
4. "Bobby Lee" – 3:07
5. "Weathervane" – 3:26
6. "Juice + June" – 4:01
7. "Hummingbird" – 4:33
8. "Hurricane" – 4:19
9. "Come Home" – 2:16
10. "Too Late" – 4:04
11. "Wasted Word" – 3:22
12. "Short Work" – 2:55
13. "Mingalay" (Delmhorst, Traditional) – 5:51

== Personnel ==
- Kris Delmhorst – vocals, electric and acoustic guitar, fiddle, cello, baritone guitar
- Kevin Barry – guitar, lap steel guitar
- Jabe "Charlie The Bubble Palantino" Beyer – guitar, background vocals
- Dana Colley – background vocals
- Billy Conway – drums, percussion, background vocals
- Mark Erelli – guitar, background vocals
- Steve Mayone – guitar
- Andrew Mazzone – bass, 8-string sass, baritone guitar
- Julie Wolf – organ, piano, accordion, xylophone, Melodica, Wurlitzer, background vocals

== Production ==
- Produced by Kris Delmhorst and Billy Conway
- Engineered by Paul Q. Kolderie, Billy Conway, Jason Raboin and Dana Colley
- Mixed by Paul Q. Kolderie
- Mastered by Dave Locke
- Photography by Megan Summers
