= Ghost Repeater =

Studio album by Jeffrey Foucault
- Released: May 23, 2006
- Recorded: December 2005, Minstrel, Iowa City, IA
- Genres: Americana, Folk music
- Length: 47:36
- Label: Signature Sounds
- Producer: Bo Ramsey

Jeffrey Foucault chronology
Stripping Cane (2004)	Ghost Repeater (2006)	Shoot the Moon Right Between the Eyes (2009)

Ghost Repeater is the third solo album from singer/songwriter Jeffrey Foucault. Produced by Bo Ramsey, Ghost Repeater was released on May 23, 2006, two years after the release of Foucault's previous effort, Stripping Cane. The album represented a notable departure from Foucault's previous records, favoring a rich texture over the sparse nature of Foucault's earlier recordings.

== Reception ==
Professional ratings
Review scores
Source	Rating
Minor 7th	(not rated)
No Depression	(no rating)

Ghost Repeater received high praise from critics, with The Chicago Sun-Times hailing it as "One of the best albums of the year." Writing for Minor 7th, music critic David Kleiner wrote of the album "Ghosts haunt the landscape of Jeffrey Foucault’s latest release. He’ll wrap his lusciously deep voice around every achingly beautiful melody ("One Part Love," for one), play good six string, and even write songs that ought to be hits on country radio ("Mesa, Arizona"). And he’ll make the best damn album I’ve heard this year, "Ghost Repeater." Writing for No Depression, music critic Eric R. Danton wrote of the album "... his spare, rootsy tunes are deceptively complex. He’s a skilled observer, shifting easily between general observations about life and startling first-person details, relating both in a tousled voice that resonates with a certain lived-in wisdom... The title track is the real stunner here, though... the homage ties together the threads of blues, folk and country that run through the album."

== Track listing ==
All songs by Jeffrey Foucault.

1. "Ghost Repeater" - 5:11
2. "Americans in Corduroys" - 4:50
3. "I Dream an Old Lover" - 4:14
4. "One for Sorrow" - 3:52
5. "Train to Jackson" - 4:18
6. "One Part Love" - 4:08
7. "Wild Waste and Welter" - 5:12
8. "City Flower" - 3:38
9. "Tall Grass in Old Virginny" - 3:27
10. "Mesa, Arizona" - 5:05
11. "Appeline" - 3:47

== Personnel ==
- Jeffrey Foucault - acoustic guitar, vocals
- Bo Ramsey - electric guitar, resonator guitar, Weissenborn guitar
- Rick Cicalo - bass, stand up bass
- Steve Hayes - drums, percussion
- Dave Moore - accordion
- Eric Heywood - pedal steel
- Nate Basinger - hammond organ, Wurlitzer
- Kris Delmhorst - vocals

Production notes:

- Produced by Bo Ramsey
- Recorded by John Svec at Minstrel, Iowa City, Iowa
- Assistant Engineering by Lorne Entress and Dirk Freymouth
- Mixed by Tom Tucker, assisted by Danielle Clare
- Mastered by Jim Demain
- Art direction & design - Christian Helms
- Photography by Sandra Dyas
