= Horse Latitudes (poetry collection) =

Poetry collection by Paul Muldoon

Horse Latitudes is tenth collection of poetry from the Northern Irish poet Paul Muldoon. It was published by Faber and Faber on 19 October 2006. It consists of 19 sonnets, each named for a battle beginning with the letter B.

Its name stems from the areas north and south of the equator in which sailing ships tend to be becalmed, and where sailors traditionally (and possibly apocryphally) threw horses overboard, to lighten the ship and conserve food supplies (see Horse latitudes). The title was previously employed by Doors singer Jim Morrison for a song on the Strange Days album.

Like many of Muldoon's recent collections, Horse Latitudes contains a long poem – in this case a sonnet sequence ostensibly describing battle scenes through time and place. The collection also features several other characteristic features of Muldoon's work, such as fixed poetic forms and deft technique combined with a seemingly casual approach full of puns, slant-rhymes and wordplay. The collection is based on serious themes and emotions. Muldoon has reportedly said that the battle of Baghdad "is implied by omission", consistent with the themes of evasion, silence and censorship.

This collection contains the poem "Sillyhow Stride", written in memory of Warren Zevon.

== Critical reception ==
In his review of Horse Latitudes, James Fenton of The Guardian described the work as "disconcerting", and praised Muldoon for the "brilliance of his verbal transformations".

Jim McCue of The Independent described Muldoon as "a good poet in the doldrums", saying that after 48 trips to the dictionary he felt "the book's erudition is for show, and wordplay stands in for meaning instead of standing up for it".

The New York Times noted the clever and obscure references which Muldoon used to convey the anger and sadness in his poetry, and said "the poem's weird levity only darkens the tone". The review of Robert Potts in The Telegraph echoed this, saying the "ludic nature" of Muldoon's work "has occasionally irritated less patient readers" but that his "fun does not preclude his seriousness". Potts also praises Muldoon for his "absolute control of pitch and tone, his slinky rhythms and winking jests".

The Irish incarnation of The Independent said understanding Muldoon "is often about as easy as to imagine Finnegans Wake outselling the Farmers Journal", but added "however much the subject-line veers, in the end it comes home, surprisingly enough, to simplicity and clarity". Reviewer Brian Lynch mentioned the intensely personal subject matter of his family's cancer history and the juxtaposition between this and the battles through history. He concluded "Muldoon more often than not manages by dint of skill to bring the private and public momentarily into balance, to achieve the calm associated with the oceanic standstill found at the latitudes of the title".
