= Mattel Hot Birds =

Set of 6 futuristic die-cast toy airplanes

Hot Birds is a set of 6 futuristic die-cast toy airplanes produced by American toy maker Mattel in 1971. All 6 of the models were manufactured in the US. 4 of the models were also produced in Hong Kong. Hot Birds were painted with the same Spectraflame paint as Mattel's Hot Wheels cars were painted. However, the planes came in only five colors, Red, Blue, Green, Gold/Yellow, and Magenta. Not all models came in all colors. These colors also came in varying shades believed due to the way the paint was mixed at the factory.

Model names/manufacturing countries were:

- 6075 – Sky Scraper (USA and Hong Kong)
- 6076 – Cloud Hopper (USA and Hong Kong)
- 6077 – Star Grazer (USA and Hong Kong)
- 6078 – Ski Gull (USA only)
- 6079 – Maching Bird (USA and Hong Kong)
- 6080 – Regal Eagle (USA only)

Rarity by Color

Color	Maching Bird	Sky Scraper	Regal Eagle	Cloud Hopper	Star Grazer	Ski Gull
Red	16.3%	31.0%	28.9%	6.9%	27.3%	5.6%
Blue	28.6%	7.1%	24.4%	8.6%	13.6%	48.1%
Green	12.2%	19.0%	0.0%	37.9%	15.9%	14.8%
Gold	24.5%	4.8%	44.4%	22.4%	11.4%	13.0%
Magenta	18.4%	38.1%	2.2%	24.1%	31.8%	18.5%

- As Mattel does not publish production numbers these are only approximate. They are only to be used for collecting purposes. For example, by using the chart one could conclude that Blue Ski Gulls are common while Green Regal Eagles are rare.
- The percentages don't reflect total models produced or country of origin.

Hot Birds Play Sets

- Sky Solo set
- On Target set
- Sky Command set
- Air Race set
- Picture Maker

Hot Birds Accessories

- Carrying Case
- Flight Deck
- Sky Line & Hook pack
- Joy Rider
- Control Tower
