= Strange Conversation =

Studio album by Kris Delmhorst
- Released: June 27, 2006
- Recorded: North Reading, MA
- Genre: Americana, Folk music
- Length: 41:20
- Label: Signature Sounds
- Producer: Kris Delmhorst

Kris Delmhorst chronology
Songs for a Hurricane (2003)	Strange Conversation (2006)	Shotgun Singer (2008)

Strange Conversation is an album by singer/songwriter Kris Delmhorst, released in 2006.

== History ==
Multi-instrumentalist and songwriter Delmhorst takes on setting some works of famous poets to music along with her own original compositions. The lead off track is named after Italian composer Baldassare Galuppi. Inspired by and quoting heavily from the Robert Browning poem A Toccata of Galuppi's, Delmhorst reflects on the composers times and style:

"And the minor third so bitter, the six chord like a sigh,
suspension, solution, asking must we die, must we die must we die?
And the seventh says well fellas, life might not last, but we can try…"

Strange Conversations was recorded at the same time as Delmhorst's follow up CD, Shotgun Singer.

== Reception ==
Professional ratings
Review scores
Source	Rating
Allmusic	(no rating)

Critic Joe Viglione of Allmusic called Strange Conversation "an impressive and ambitious work that is evidence of the sophistication enveloping the Kris Delmhorst catalog and one hopes that these important musings get noticed beyond the cult that realizes something very special is happening here."

== Track listing ==
All songs by Kris Delmhorst unless noted.

1. "Galuppi Baldassare" – 4:15
2. "We'll Go No More A-Roving" (Byron, Delmhorst) – 3:04
3. "Light of the Light" – 4:34
4. "Since You Went Away" (Delmhorst, James Weldon Johnson, Olson) – 3:06
5. "Strange Conversation" – 3:36
6. "The Drop & The Dream" – 3:04
7. "Invisible Choir" – 3:44
8. "Pretty How Town" (e. e. cummings, Delmhorst) – 1:57
9. "Tavern" (Delmhorst, Edna St. Vincent Millay) – 3:42
10. "Water, Water" – 2:40
11. "Sea Fever" (Delmhorst, John Masefield) – 3:43
12. "Everything Is Music" – 3:55

== Personnel ==
- Kris Delmhorst – vocals, acoustic guitar, fiddle, piano, cello, background vocals
- Kevin Barry – electric and acoustic guitar, lap steel guitar, Dobro, piano, background vocals
- Mark Chenevert – clarinet, tenor sax
- Lorne Entress – drums, percussion, background vocals
- Dave Harris – trombone, tuba
- Paul Kochanski – double bass, background vocals
- Mike Peipman – trumpet
- Chris Rival – organ
- Tom West – Hammond organ

== Production ==
- Produced by Kris Delmhorst
- Engineered and mixed by Chris Rival
- Mastered by Dave McNair
- Photography by Megan Summers
- Translation by Coleman Barks
- Artwork and design by Brian Turner
