= Firebird =

Firebird and fire bird may refer to:

== Mythical birds ==
- Phoenix (mythology), sacred firebird found in the mythologies of many cultures
  - Fenghuang, sometimes called Chinese phoenix
- Vermilion bird, one of the four symbols of the Chinese constellation representing fire
- Bennu, Egyptian firebird
- Huma bird, Persian firebird
- Firebird (Slavic folklore)

== Automobiles ==
- Pontiac Firebird, American pony car
- General Motors Firebird, series of concept cars

== Aviation ==
- AAM-A-1 Firebird, an American air-to-air missile of the 1940s
- Chengdu J-10 (NATO reporting name: Firebird), a Chinese combat aircraft
- Northrop Grumman Firebird, an American recon/surveillance aircraft
- CargoLogicAir, a defunct British airline (callsign: FIREBIRD)

== Film and television ==
- Firebird (film), a 2021 film directed by Peeter Rebane
- The Firebird (1934 film), a murder mystery directed by William Dieterle
- The Firebird (1952 film), a musical drama film directed by Hasse Ekman
- "Firebird" (Once Upon a Time), an episode of the fifth season of Once Upon a Time
- Fire Birds, a 1990 action film directed by David Green

== Music ==
- The Firebird, a ballet for which Igor Stravinsky (1882–1971) composed the music
- Firebird (band), a British blues-rock power trio founded by Bill Steer in 1999
- The Firebirds, an English rock band from Bristol
- The Firebird Band, an indie rock band from Chicago, Illinois featuring Chris Broach
- Firebird (album), a 2021 album by Natalie Imbruglia
- Fire Bird (album), a 2016 album by Miyavi
- Firebirds (album), a 1968 jazz album by Prince Lasha and Sonny Simmons
- "The Firebird", a song by Priestess from the album Prior to the Fire
- "Firebird", a song by Galantis from the album Pharmacy
- "Firebird", a song by Owl City from the album Cinematic
- "Firebirds", a song by Clutch from the album Psychic Warfare
- "FIRE BIRD", a song by Roselia

=== Companies ===
- Firebird Music, American music holdings company

=== Instruments ===
- Firebird (trumpet), a trumpet with valves and slide
- Gibson Firebird, an electric guitar from the 1960s

== Publications ==
- The Firebird and Princess Vasilisa, a Russian fairy tale by Alexander Afanasyev
- Firebird (Lackey novel), a 1996 novel retelling the Russian folk tale, by Mercedes Lackey
- Firebird (Tyers novel), a 1986 science fiction novel by Kathy Tyers
- Firebird, a 1999 memoir by Mark Doty
- Firebird, a 2011 science fiction novel by Jack McDevitt
- Firebirds (anthology), a 2003 collection of short stories for young adults by Firebird Books
- Firebird (Marvel Comics), a Marvel Comics character
- Firebird, comic book character from JLX, published by Amalgam Comics, see list of Amalgam Comics characters
- Firebird Books, an imprint of Penguin launched in 2002
- Firebird (Pirotta picture book), a 2010/2014 picture book by Saviour Pirotta and Catherine Hyde
- Firebird (Copeland book), a 2014 children's picture book by Misty Copeland

== Software ==
- Firebird (database server), a relational database management system
- Firebird Software, a video game label formerly owned by Telecomsoft
- Hi no Tori, known as Firebird in Europe, a computer game developed by Konami Japan in 1987
- Mozilla Firebird, former name of the Mozilla Firefox browser
- Firebird BBS, one of two main telnet-based systems developed in Taiwan
- Firebirds (video game), computer game for the ZX Spectrum released in 1983
- Firebird (emulator), open source emulator for the TI-Nspire series calculator

== Sport ==
- Albany Firebirds, an American Arena Football team
- Coachella Valley Firebirds, a team in the American Hockey league
- Firebird International Raceway, a dragstrip and motorsports park in Phoenix, Arizona, U.S.
- Firebird Skydiving, an American manufacturer of skydiving equipment
- Flint Firebirds, a team in the Ontario Hockey League based in Flint, Michigan, U.S.
- Indiana Firebirds, a former Arena Football team in Indiana, U.S.
- Phoenix Firebirds, a former Minor League Baseball team in Arizona, U.S.
- Queensland Firebirds, an Australian netball team based in Brisbane, Queensland, Australia
- UDC Firebirds, University of the District of Columbia Athletics program, U.S.
- Wellington Firebirds, a cricket team based in Wellington, New Zealand
- Lancaster Firebirds youth hockey program in Lancaster, Pennsylvania, U.S.

== Other uses ==
- Firebird (roller coaster), a B&M Floorless Coaster at Six Flags America in Maryland

== See also ==
- Fire (disambiguation)
- Bird (disambiguation)
- Firehawk (disambiguation)
- Phoenix (disambiguation)
- Redbird (disambiguation)
- Fiery Birds, a sculpture in Szczecin, Poland
