= Jeffrey Foucault =

American singer-songwriter

- Born: Jeffrey Foucault; January 26, 1976 (age 50)
- Origin: Whitewater, Wisconsin, United States
- Genres: Folk blues, country, rock and roll, folk
- Occupations: Musician, singer/songwriter
- Instruments: Acoustic guitar, electric guitar
- Label: Signature Sounds
- Website: Jeffreyfoucault.com

Jeffrey Foucault (born January 26, 1976) is an American songwriter and record producer from Whitewater, Wisconsin, United States, whose work marries the influence of American country, blues, rock 'n' roll, and folk music. He has released seven full-length solo albums under his own name and two full-band lyrical collaborations with poet Lisa Olstein, under the moniker Cold Satellite. Foucault has toured extensively in the United States, Canada, the United Kingdom and Europe since 2001, in both full-band and solo appearances. From 2013 through 2020, he performed as a duo with drummer Billy Conway (Morphine, Treat Her Right).

Foucault's solo releases were previously issued by western Massachusetts-based independent label Signature Sounds, including Stripping Cane (2004), Ghost Repeater (2006) and Horse Latitudes (2011). His 2015 release, Salt As Wolves, was self-released on BlueBlade Records. His bands have featured or included Eric Heywood (Son Volt, Pretenders, Ray Lamontagne), Bo Ramsey (Greg Brown, Lucinda Williams, Pieta Brown), Billy Conway (Morphine), Jennifer Condos (Joe Henry, Sam Phillips), Jeremy Moses Curtis (Booker T), David Goodrich (Chris Smither), Van Dyke Parks (Harry Nilsson, Ry Cooder, Ringo Starr) and Caitlin Canty.

Foucault has produced three albums for other artists, including Hayward Williams's The Reef (2014), Caitlin Canty's Reckless Skyline (2015) and John Statz's Tulsa (2015). Don Henley performed Foucault's song, "Everybody's Famous", during his 2011 tour of California, and Foucault's songs have appeared on the television shows Sons of Anarchy, Preacher, and Nashville.

Foucault's 2015 release, Salt As Wolves, debuted at number 7 in the Billboard Top Blues Album Chart for the week of November 7, 2015.

As of 2016, Foucault lived in New England with his wife, fellow musician and songwriter Kris Delmhorst.

== Discography ==
- 2001: Miles from the Lightning
- 2004: Stripping Cane
- 2005: Redbird (with Peter Mulvey and Kris Delmhorst)
- 2006: Ghost Repeater
- 2009: Shoot the Moon Right Between the Eyes: Jeffrey Foucault Sings the Songs of John Prine
- 2010: Seven Curses (with Mark Erelli)
- 2010: Cold Satellite (with Cold Satellite)
- 2011: Live at the Cafe Carpe (with Redbird)
- 2011: Horse Latitudes
- 2013: Cavalcade (with Cold Satellite)
- 2015: Salt as Wolves
- 2018: Blood Brothers
- 2018: Horse Latitudes Solo / Acoustic Demos
- 2020: Deadstock: Uncollected Recordings 2005 – 2020
- 2024: The Universal Fire
