= Kris Delmhorst =

American singer-songwriter and musician

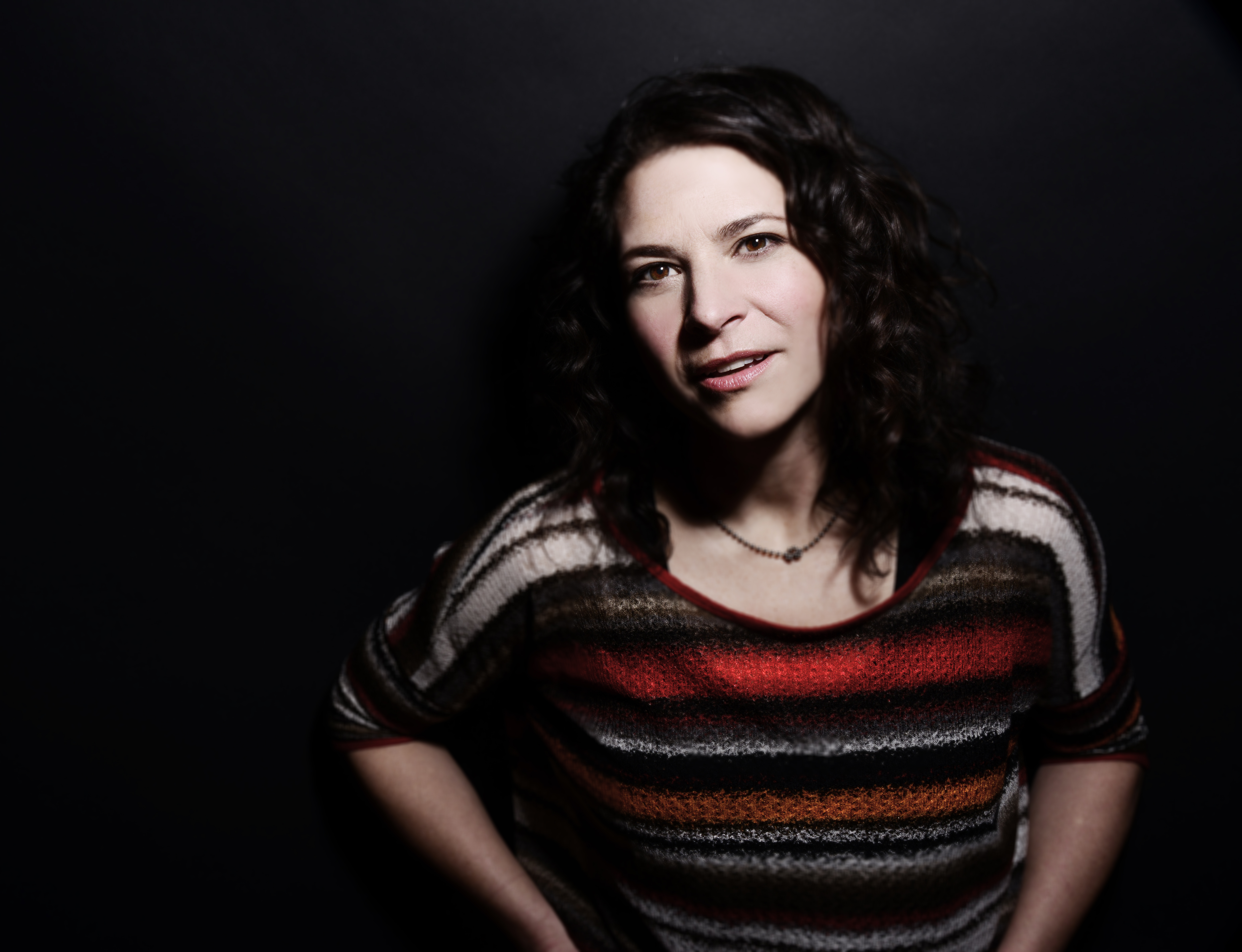
- photo by Shervin Lainez

Background information
- Born: Brooklyn, New York City, United States
- Origin: United States
- Genres: Folk, Americana
- Occupations: Musician, singer-songwriter
- Instruments: vocals, guitar, fiddle, cello, viola, organ, piano, bass, mandolin, ukulele
- Years active: 1996–present
- Labels: Big Bean Music, Signature Sounds
- Website: krisdelmhorst.com

Kris Delmhorst is an American singer-songwriter and musician. Originally from Brooklyn, New York City, United States, she now lives in Western Massachusetts, is an active member of the Boston folk scene, and tours internationally. She has released eight full-length solo albums and two EPs on Signature Sounds Recordings.

== Biography ==
Delmhorst released Appetite, her first album, in 1998, the same year she was involved in producing the Respond compilation, a fundraiser for domestic violence groups. It included her song Weatherman. In 1999, she released a live album with The Vinal Avenue String Band, consisting of herself, Sean Staples, and Ry Cavanaugh. Her second solo album, Five Stories, was released in 2001 and was well received. In 2005, Delmhorst, Jeffrey Foucault, and Peter Mulvey released an album entitled Redbird. The trio released a live album in 2011.

In 2006, Delmhorst took the words of poems by writers such as Lord Byron, George Eliot and Edna St. Vincent Millay, and set them to original music. Delmhorst released Shotgun Singer in 2008, a collection of original recordings noted for its artistic vibe, instrumentation and alternative aesthetic, compared to previous recordings that focused more heavily on vocals and lyrics. In 2011, Delmhorst gathered instrumentalists and singers from across the Boston/Cambridge music scene, including The Cars’ keyboardist Greg Hawkes, to record a covers album dedicated to music by the new wave band The Cars.

Delmhorst's seventh album, Blood Test was released on Signature Sounds on May 13, 2014. It is her first of original music since her 2008 album Shotgun Singer. Delmhorst has recorded vocals, fiddle and cello on over 50 albums from artists such as Peter Wolf, Mary Gauthier, Chris Smither and Lori McKenna.

Delmhorst is married to fellow singer-songwriter Foucault, with whom she had a daughter in 2008. She occasionally performs as part of the collective Redbird with Foucault and Mulvey.

== Discography ==
=== Solo albums ===
- 1998 – Appetite
- 2001 – Five Stories
- 2003 – Songs for a Hurricane
- 2006 – Strange Conversation
- 2008 – Shotgun Singer
- 2011 – CARS
- 2014 – Blood Test
- 2017 – The Wild
- 2020 – Long Day in the Milky Way
- 2025 – Ghosts in the Garden

=== EPs ===
- 2000 – Oddlot (Live EP)
- 2008 – Horses Swimming (EP)

=== Redbird ===
with Peter Mulvey and Jeffrey Foucault

- 2005 – Redbird
- 2010 – Live at the Cafe Carpe (live album)

=== Vinal Avenue String Band ===
with Sean Staples and Ry Cavanaugh

- 1999 -Live at Tir na nÓg

=== Other contributions ===
- WYEP Live and Direct: Volume 4 – On Air Performances (2002) – "Little Wings"

== In the press ==
- “moody, euphoric, and transcendent” – Los Angeles Times
- "bold and brilliant" – Boston Globe
- "Delmhorst has become a favorite among music fans who like to be challenged as well as entertained." – Music Box Online
- "a work of lo-fi beauty… evidence of an artist taking flight" – Boston Herald
- "As seamless and brave as it is brilliantly creative" – Irish Times
- "warm and immediately accessible" … "a voice that breathes through the speakers" – AllMusic
