= List of magazines in Sweden =

The following is an incomplete list of current and defunct magazines published in Sweden. They may be published in Swedish or in other languages.

== A ==
- Acne Paper
- Affärsvärlden
- Akademikern
- Åkeri & Entreprenad
- Aktiespararen
- Aktuellt i Politiken
- Allas
- Allt om Historia
- Allt om Kök och Bad
- Allt om Resor
- Amelia
- Äntligen Hemma
- Arbetarhistoria
- Arbetet
- Arbetsliv
- Arena
- Året Runt
- Ars Interpres
- Artes
- ATL Lantbrukets Affärstidning
- Axess magasin

== B ==
- Bahro Suryoyo
- Bang
- Barn
- Det Bästa
- Båtliv
- Bildjournalen
- Bilsport
- Bilsport Classic
- Biotech Sweden
- Blandaren
- Bobo
- Brand
- Buffé
- Byggnadsarbetaren

== C ==
- Café
- Chef
- Clarté
- Cosmopolitan (Swedish edition)
- Civilekonomen

== D ==
- Dagens Arbete
- Dagny
- Damernas Värld
- Direkt Aktion

== E ==
- Elle (Swedish edition)
- Entreprenadaktuellt
- Expo

== F ==
- Femina
- Fighter Magazine
- Filmjournalen
- Filter
- Fokus
- Folket i Bild/Kulturfront
- Frida
- Frisinnad Tidskrift
- Forskning och framsteg
- Fronesis

== G ==
- Glänta
- Grönköpings Veckoblad

== H ==
- Handelsnytt
- Hänt Bild
- Hänt Extra
- Häpna!
- Häst&Ryttare
- Hem Ljuva Hem
- Hem Ljuva Hem Trädgård
- Hem i Sverige
- Hemmets Journal
- Hemmets Veckotidning
- Hennes
- Hundsport
- Husmodern

== I ==
- Icakuriren
- Idrottsbladet
- Illustrerad Vetenskap
- Internetworld

== J ==
- Jefferson Blues Magazine
- Jordbruksaktuellt
- Journalisten
- Judisk Krönika
- Judisk Tidskrift

== K ==
- Kamratposten
- Kingsize Magazine
- Kommunalarbetaren
- Kris
- Kyrkans Tidning

== L ==
- Land Lantbruk
- Lärarnas Tidning
- lön & jobb
- Lyckoslanten

== M ==
- MagazineSweden
- mama
- Miljöaktuellt

== N ==
- Neue Rundschau
- Nordens Frihet
- Nöjesguiden
- Ny Tid
- Nya Affärer
- Det Nya Sverige

== O-Ö ==
- OBS!
- Offside
- Okej
- OmVärlden
- Öppet Hus
- Ord och Bild
- Ottar

== P ==
- Paletten
- Pedagogiska Magasinet
- Pietisten
- Plaza Interiör
- Plaza Kvinna
- Populär Historia
- Position
- Privata Affärer
- Power Magazine
- PRO Pensionären
- Puss

== R ==
- Release Magazine
- Resultat
- Resumé
- Ridsport
- Rotary Norden
- Röda Korsets Tidning
- Rösträtt för kvinnor

== S ==
- Salt
- Samefolket
- Scanorama
- Science Illustrated
- Se
- Se & Hör
- SEKO magasinet
- Shortcut
- Siftidningen
- Sköna hem
- Skogsaktuellt
- Skolvärlden
- SKTF-tidningen
- Slitz
- Solo
- Söndags-Nisse
- Stella
- Stockholms Figaro
- Storm
- Stormklockan
- Straight
- Super PLAY
- Svensk Damtidning
- Svensk Golf
- Svensk Jakt
- Svensk Jakt Nyheter
- Sverigemagasinet
- Sunt Förnuft

== T ==
- Tara
- Teknikens Värld
- Teknisk Tidskrift
- Teosofisk Tidskrift
- Thalia
- Then Swänska Argus
- Tiden
- Tidevarvet
- Turist
- Tvärsnitt

== V ==
- Vagabond
- Vår bostad
- Veckans Affärer
- Veckans Vimmel
- Vecko-Journalen
- Veteranen
- Vi
- Viking Heritage
- Villaägaren

== W ==
- Wheels Magazine

== Z ==
- Zionisten

== See also ==
- Media in Sweden
- List of Swedish newspapers
