= Christopher Östlund =

Swedish publisher

Christopher Östlund (born October 9, 1966) is the publisher of Plaza Magazine International, a magazine in the field of fashion, interior and design.

Östlund, born in Uppsala, Sweden, is the founder and owner of several international and Scandinavian magazines, including Plaza Magazine, Plaza Interiör, Plaza Kvinna, Hem Ljuva Hem, Hem Ljuva Hem Trädgård, Tove and Vimmel, Plaza Husguiden, Plaza Kök o Bad, Plaza Koti (Monthly Finnish interior title), Oma Koti Kullan Kallis (Finnish interior title), Swedish Gourmet (founded 1979) and Plaza Watch among several other medias. The Group publish 18 magazines in 48 countries in 5 languages.
