= Chef (disambiguation) =

A chef is a person who cooks professionally.

Chef or The Chef may also refer to:

== Arts, entertainment, and media ==
=== Films ===
- Chef (2014 film), a 2014 film directed by Jon Favreau
- Chef (2017 film), an Indian film directed by Raja Krishna Menon
- The Chef (film), a 2012 French comedy film directed by Daniel Cohen

=== Television ===
- Chef!, a 1993–1996 BBC sitcom
- Chefs (TV series), a 2015 French television series
- The Chef (TV series), a 2009 Iranian TV series

=== Characters ===
- Chef (South Park), a character in South Park
- Swedish Chef, a character from The Muppet Show
- Chef Kawasaki, from Kirby

=== Other arts, entertainment, and media ===
- CHEF, a defunct radio station in Granby, Quebec, Canada
- Chef (magazine), a Swedish business magazine
- The Chefs, a Brighton-based pop group
- Chef (Game & Watch), a 1981 Game & Watch game made by Nintendo
- The Chef (novel), a novel by James Patterson and Max DiLallo (2019)

== Computing ==
- Chef (company), the makers of Chef software
  - Chef (software), an open source configuration management tool
- Chef (programming language), an esoteric programming language designed by David Morgan-Mar

== Other uses ==
- Chef (nickname) list of people with the nickname or pseudonym "Chef"
- Chef (baking agent), a bread starter
- Chef, a cat food brand manufactured by Wattie's
- "Chef" brand, an Irish condiment brand owned by Valeo Foods

== See also ==
- Chief (disambiguation)
