= Kenza Zouiten =

Swedish fashion model, blogger and actress

Kenza Zouiten Subosic
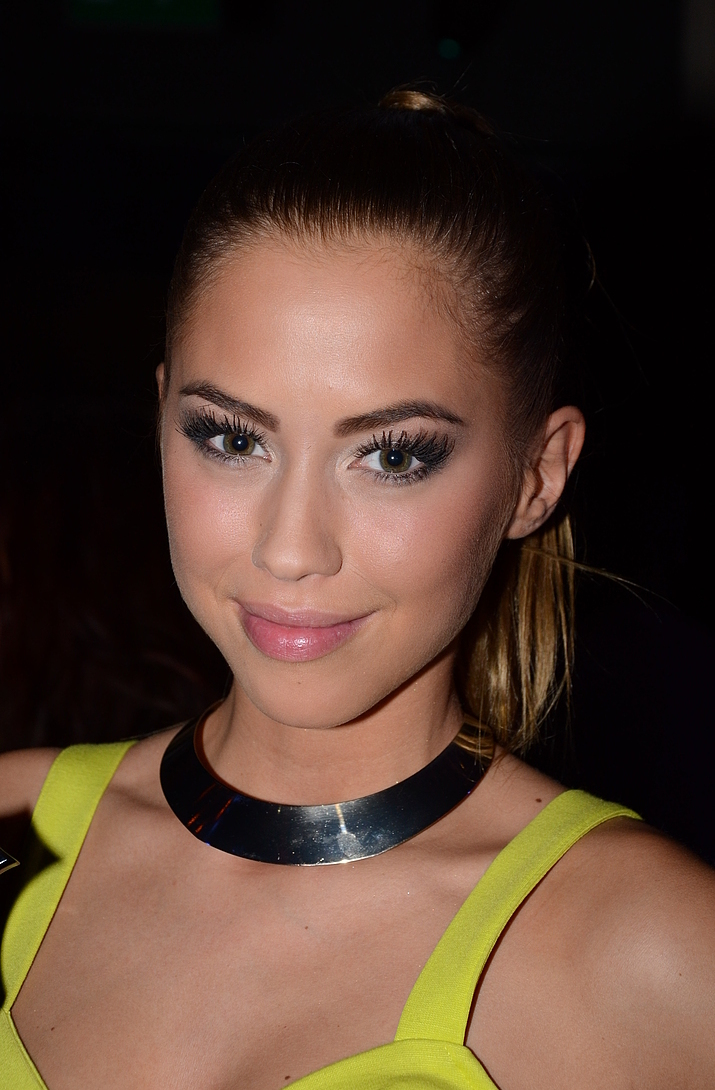
- Kenza Zouiten (2011)
- Born: 21 April 1991 (age 35); Stockholm, Sweden
- Occupations: Model, blogger, entrepreneur
- Spouse: Alex Subosic (m. 2017)
- Children: 4
- Website: kenzas.se

Kenza Zouiten (Arabic: كنزة زويتن; born 21 April 1991) is a Swedish fashion model, blogger, and entrepreneur.

== Career ==
Kenza was born in Sweden. Kenza's father is from Morocco and her mother is Swedish. Between the ages of two and six, Kenza lived in Morocco.

Later returning to Sweden, Kenza hosted her own web TV show Kenza & Tyra Show. She runs the blog "Kenzas" which has become one of Sweden's most viewed blogs. She has modeled in campaigns for Guldfynd, Ur & Penn and JC. She has also been on the cover of the magazines VeckoRevyn, Frida, Café magazine, Bubbleroom Magazine and Solo.

Zouiten has been a model for Elite Model Management. It was estimated that Kenza earned 2.5 million (SEK) from her blog in 2011.

In November 2015, Kenza participated in the Christmas campaign "let it snow" for Nelly.com. In the campaign, she both modelled for the clothes and sang in a music video. She has her own fashion label called IvyRevel.

=== Awards ===
In 2008, she won the award at the Veckorevyns Blog Awards for "Best blog of the year". The same year, she won "Personal blog of the year" at the Finest Awards. In 2009 she won "Fashion blog of the year" by Aftonbladet newspaper, and in February 2012 Zouiten won "Best international blog" award at the Bloglovin Awards in New York, United States.

=== Let's Dance ===
In January 2014, it was announced that Kenza Zouiten would participate in Let's Dance 2014. Her dance partner was Swedish professional dancer Calle Sterner.

== Personal life ==
On 2 February, 2009, she met Alex Subosic. They began dating shortly after and were married on 29 July, 2017.

After being diagnosed with early menopause and undergoing two unsuccessful rounds of IVF, Zouiten announced her pregnancy in January 2019, saying that she had conceived the child naturally. Their son, Nikola, was born on 14 June 2019.

On 6 September 2020, they announced that they were expecting their second child. On 18 October 2020, she revealed that they were expecting another boy. The couple's second son, Danilo, was born on 5 March 2021, at exactly the same hour as his older brother, 05:06am.

In 5 December 2022, she announced that they were expecting their third child, due in June 2023.

On 22nd May 2026, she gave birth to a little girl, named Maia.
