= Innovation journalism =

Innovation Journalism is journalism covering innovation. It covers innovation processes and innovation (eco)systems.

In 2008, Innovation Journalism was listed by the World Economic Forum as one of seven key dimensions for discussing the redefinition of the media and its roles in a global, interconnected society. Innovation Journalism was included in the Sage Encyclopedia of Journalism in 2009.

The concept of Innovation Journalism was first suggested by David Nordfors in 2003.

== The practice of innovation journalism ==
Birgitta Forsberg published in 2005 a guide to how to research and write innovation journalism stories. In 2009, Samaa TV in Pakistan was awarded the National Corporate Social Responsibility Award for social initiatives it achieved through Innovation Journalism. Established in February 2007, the Finnish Society for Innovation Journalism acts as a link between people interested in innovations, the way they are covered in the media, and how better stories could be written about them. Each year, the Finnish Society for Innovation Journalism hands out the Innovation Crystal, a Finnish innovation journalism prize awarded for a particularly well-written innovation-related story published during the previous year in Finland.

== Academic research ==
In 2009 futurist researchers Inkinen and Kaivo-Oja suggested that the rise of innovation journalism as a key notion and research field revealed that the significant role of journalistic practices had not been taken into consideration in the traditional innovation models.

In 2009, Nordfors published a summary of concept development, academic research and the ongoing innovation journalism initiatives around the world

Kauhanen and Noppari suggested the definition of Innovation Journalism should have a stronger focus on social aspects.

In 2005, Uskali proposed that detecting weak signals could be important practice for innovation journalists.

Innovation Journalism is based on a systemic view, with an inherent focus on connecting different stakeholder groups in the innovation economy in a shared public narrative. This connects Innovation Journalism to a discussion about society by for example Gerber.

The idea of "newsbeats" as originally set forth by Gaye Tuchman and Herbert Gans among others, was understood as an aspect of newsroom socialization, of media economy, of gender, of time and other constraints on resources. But it did contain an idea of news journalism as an aspect of an ecosystem.

== Business models ==
Designing business models for innovation journalism has been considered non-trivial.

Sandred demonstrated a successful business model for innovation journalism with Biotech Sweden, the first International Data Group publication to systematically identify and target a sectoral innovation system as its market and audience

== Innovation journalism initiatives ==
The Innovation Journalism Initiative hosted by Stanford University started in 2004 as a collaboration with VINNOVA, resulting in the creation of the VINNOVA-Stanford Research Center of Innovation Journalism in 2009 (renamed in 2010, the Center for Innovation and Communication at Stanford University). The activities included starting up innovation journalism as academic research, an international Innovation Journalism Fellowship program, with participants from several different countries, a yearly global innovation journalism conference.

The core 'innovation journalism' concept is to consider two specific facets of journalism: innovations in journalism, e.g. the use of the Internet or other digital media in addition to traditional print, and journalistic treatment of innovation in various disciplines such that the 'vertical' consideration of specific innovations, for example their technological, business, sociological or political influences, could be embraced on a 'horizontal' basis that would more completely explain to audiences the relevance of such advances. Almost all earlier journalism has focused on one or other of the 'vertical' areas of journalism, commonly found in the popular media. Innovation journalism thus makes much broader demands on journalists, in that their narrow specialties cannot adequately capture the full spectrum of influence brought about by innovations themselves. This, in turn, calls for new approaches to journalism education.

The purpose of the Stanford initiative was to co-develop the concept and community of innovation journalism, including the role of communication in innovation ecosystems, recognizing journalists and communicators (and other attention workers) as actors facilitating the creation of shared language across stakeholder groups in innovation ecosystems.

There have been national innovation journalism initiatives including Fellowship program in collaboration with Stanford University in Sweden, Finland, Slovenia, Mexico and Pakistan.

Innovation journalism was introduced to Finns by Kimmo Ahola and Dr. Seppo Sisättö in spring 2004. University of Tampere organized the very first course on innovation journalism for the Finnish journalists and researchers (N=12) during Fall 2004 and Spring 2005. The first undergraduate course on innovation journalism was organized in University of Jyväskylä in Fall 2005 by Dr. Turo Uskali. Later, 2011, Uskali also published the first text book about innovation journalism in Finland, Finnish innovation journalism fellowship program started in 2006 and ended 2011, a year earlier than planned. It was co-funded by Helsingin Sanomat Foundation and Sitra. The experiences of the Finnish innovation journalism fellowships and innovation journalism courses were published in an article in Journalism and Mass Communication Editor in 2011. In addition, the last two years of Finnish innovation journalism fellowship (2010-2011) were researched by Marko Lindgren in 2012.

Atomium Culture, an international non-profit organisation of European universities, newspapers and businesses, announced in 2009 that their permanent platform program introducing innovation journalism to five hundred researchers per year would be expanded by seminars on innovation journalism throughout Europe
