= Dick Harrison =

Swedish historian (born 1966)

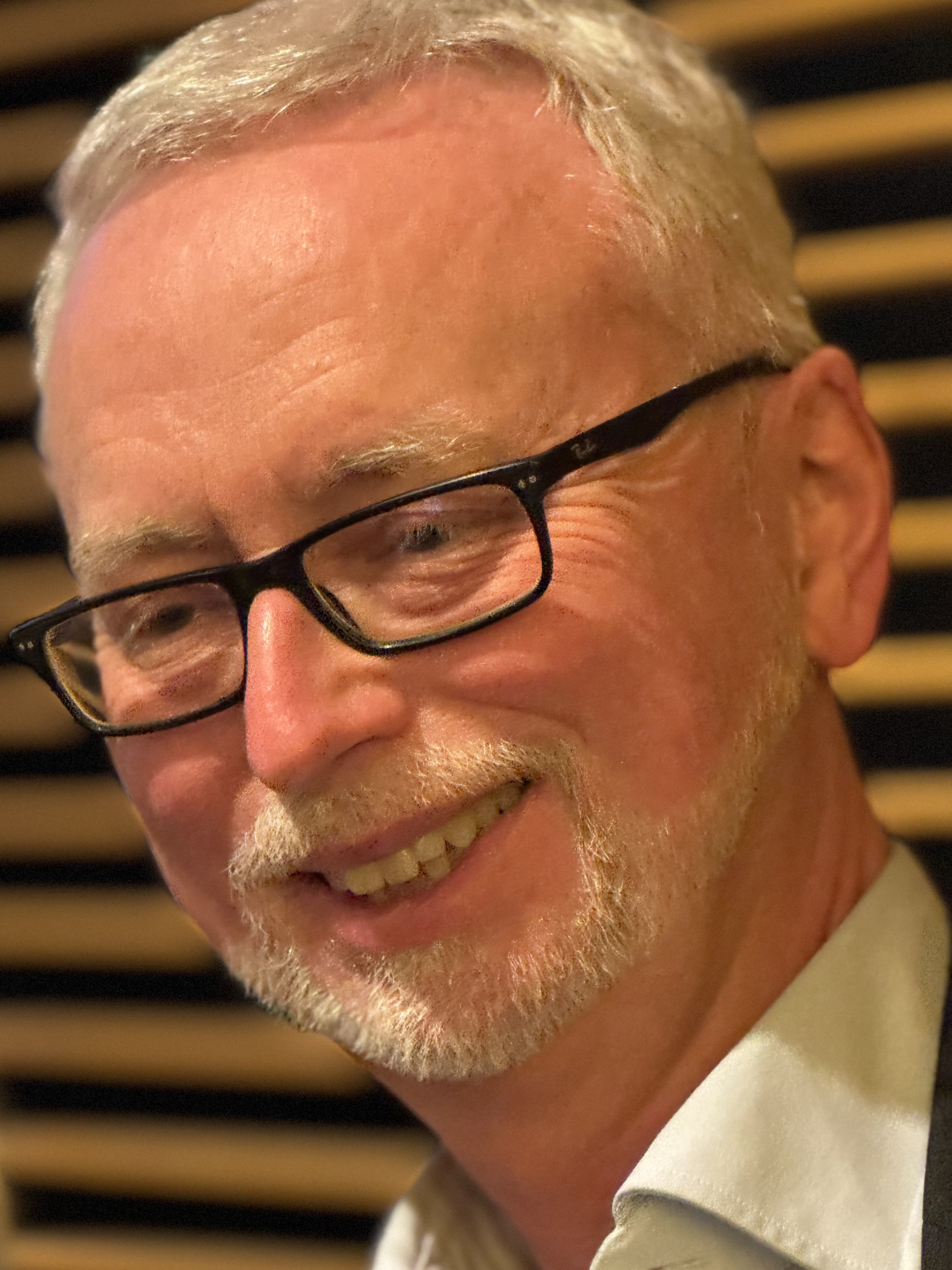
- Harrison in 2025
- Born: Dick Walther Harrysson; 10 April 1966 (age 60); Huddinge, Sweden
- Education: Spyken; Lund University
- Occupations: Author, historian
- Spouse: Katarina Lindbergh (m. 2008)
- Children: 1
- Writing career
- Language: Swedish
- Genres: Historical novels, non-fiction
- Subject: European Middle Ages

Dick Walther Harrison (born 10 April 1966) is a Swedish historian. He is currently a Professor of History at Lund University.

His main areas of interest are the European Middle Ages, including the medical history of the period and the history of slavery. Harrison regularly writes articles for the Swedish journal Populär Historia (Popular History). He has also written popular historical works and, during Spring 2010, a blog covering the history of monarchs and monarchies with emphasis on the Swedish monarchy. Harrison regularly gives lectures to the general public on a broad range of historical topics.

Harrison is the editor-in-chief of a comprehensive series about Swedish history published by Norstedts with the first volume released in September, 2009. The Swedish TV channel TV4 has made a companion television series for which Harrison is the historical consultant and co-host along with Martin Timell. The TV series has 12 episodes of which the first six aired on TV4 during spring 2010. The second set of six episodes aired spring 2011.

In addition to his historical writing, Harrison has written three historical novels about Ulvbjörn Vamodsson, a 7th-century (fictitious) warrior: Ofärd, Niding and Illdåd.

Harrison was born in Huddinge, Stockholm County, and spent much of his youth in Staffanstorp in Scania. He married Katarina Lindbergh in 2010.

== Selected bibliography ==
=== Non-fiction ===
- 1995 – Europa I världen : medeltiden Europe in the World: Middle Ages
- 1997 – Uppror och allianser: politiskt våld i 1400-talets svenska bondesamhälle Revolts and Alliances: Political Violence in 15th Century Swedish Rural Society
- 1998 – Skapelsens geografi Geographic Creation: Perceptions of Space and Place in Medieval Europe
- 1998 – Age of Abbesses and Queens
- 1999 – Krigarnas och helgonens tid: Västeuropas historia 400–800 e.Kr. The Era of Warriors and Saints: Western European History 400-800 A.D.
- 1999 – I skuggan av Cathay: västeuropéers möte med Asien 1400–1600 In the Shadow of Cathay: Western Europeans Encounters with Asia 1400-1600
- 2000 – Mannen från Barnsdale: historien om Robin Hood och hans legend The Man From Barnsdale: The History of Robin Hood and His Legend
- 2000 – Stora döden: den värsta katastrof som drabbat Europa The Black Death: the Worst Disaster to Strike Europe (Received August prize)
- 2000 – På Klios fält: essäer om historisk forskning och historieskrivning On Clio's Field: Essays About Historical Research and Writing
- 2002 – Jarlens sekel: en berättelse om 1200-talets Sverige The Earl's Century: an Account of 13th Century Sweden (chosen as Swedish history book of the year)
- 2002 – Karl Knutsson: En biografi Karl Knutsson: a Biography
- 2002 – Sveriges historia – medeltiden Sweden's History: Middle Ages
- 2003 – Harrisons historia Harrison's History (textbook)
- 2003 – Tankar om historia Thoughts About History (essay collection)
- 2003 – Historiebok för kakälskare A Cookie Lovers’ History Book (historical recipes) (Together with Eva Helen Ulvros.)
- 2005 – Förrädaren, skökan och självmördaren The Traitor, the Whore and the Suicide: The Story of Judas Iscariot, Mary Magdelen, Pontius Pilate and Joseph of Aramathea
- 2005 – Gud vill det! - nordiska korsfarare under medeltiden God's Will: Nordic Crusaders During the Middle Ages
- 2006 – Slaveri: Forntiden till renässansen Slavery: Prehistoric to the Renaissance
- 2007 – Slaveri: 1500 till 1800 Slavery: 1500 to 1800
- 2008 – Slaveri: 1800 till nutid Slavery: 1800 to the present
- 2009 – Sveriges historia: 600-1350
- 2010 – Sveriges historia: 1350–1600 (with Bo Eriksson)
- 2012 – Från en säker källa...
- 2013 – 101 föremål ur Sveriges historia (with Katarina Harrison Lindbergh)
- 2015 – Slaveriets historia
- 2016 – Ett stort lidande har kommit över oss
- 2017 – Kalmars historia
- 2018 – Englands historia. Del 1, up until 1600
- 2018 – Englands historia. Del 2, from 1600 onwards
- 2018 – Dalslands historia
- 2019 – Trettioåriga kriget
- 2019 – Vikingarnas historia
- 2020 – Folkvandringstid
- 2020 – Sveriges medeltid
- 2021 – Sveriges stormaktstid

=== Fiction ===
- 2007 – Ofärd (Calamity) historical fiction set in 6th century western Europe
- 2010 - Niding (Oathbreaker) sequel to Ofärd
- 2012 - Illdåd (Misdeed) third book in the Ulvbjörn series

=== Articles ===
- "Dark Age Migrations and Subjective Ethnicity: The Example of the Lombards", Scandia 57:1, Lund 1991.
- "The Invisible Wall of St John. On Mental Centrality in Early Medieval Italy", Scandia 58:2, Lund 1992.
- "Plague, Settlement and Structural Change at the Dawn of the Middle Ages", Scandia 59:1, Lund 1993.
- "The Duke and the Archangel: A Hypothetical Model of Early State Integration in Southern Italy through the Cult of Saints", Collegium Medievale vol. 6 1993/1, Oslo 1993.
- "The Early State in Lombard Italy", Rome and the North, eds. A. Ellegård and G. Åkerström-Hougen, Jonsered 1996.
- "Murder and Execution within the Political Sphere in Fifteenth-century Scandinavia", Scandia 1997:2.
- "The Lombards in the Early Carolingian Epoch", in "Karl der Grosse und sein Nachwirken. 1200 Jahre Kultur und Wissenschaft in Europa", hrsgb. P.L. Butzer, M. Kerner und W. Oberschelp, Turnhout 1997.
- "Political Rhetoric and Political Ideology in Lombard Italy", Strategies of Distinction: The Construction of Ethnic Communities, 300–800, eds. W. Pohl and H. Reimitz, Leiden 1998.
- "Patterns of Regionalisation in Early Medieval Italy: a Historical and Methodological Problem", Analecta Romana Instituti Danici 26, Rom 1999.
- "Invisible Boundaries and Places of Power: Notions of Liminality and Centrality in the Early Middle Ages", i The Transformation of Frontiers: from Late Antiquity to the Carolingians, eds. W. Pohl, I. Wood and H. Reimitz, Leiden 2001.
- "The Development of Élites. From Roman Bureaucrats to Medieval Warlords", i Integration und Herrschaft. Ethnische Identitäten und Soziale Organisation im Frühmittelalter, Forschungen zur Geschichte des Mittelalters 3, hrsgb. Walter Pohl och Max Diesenberger, Wien 2002.
- "Structures and Resources of Power in Early Medieval Europe", i The Construction of Communities in the Early Middle Ages: Texts, Resources and Artefacts, eds. R. Corradini, M. Diesenberger and H. Reimitz, Leiden 2002.

== Honours and awards ==
- 1996 The Clio Prize
- 2000 The August Prize for non-fiction
- 2001 Duke Carl's Prize
- 2002 Book of the Year about Swedish History
