= Roger Akelius =

Swedish business magnate and philanthropist

- Born: 16 April 1945 (age 81); Stora Melby, Sweden
- Education: Lund University
- Occupation: Businessman
- Known for: Akelius Residential Property AB
- Children: 3

Roger Akelius (16 April 1945) is a Swedish business magnate. He is the founder of Akelius Residential Property AB, one of Europe's largest real estate companies.

== Early life and education ==
Akelius grew up in Stora Mellby, a small village located between Trollhättan and Alingsås. At eleven, he started his first job at a dairy farm.

Akelius worked at IBM Svenska as a system engineer, teacher, and salesman after having studied engineering and mathematics at Lund University. In 1968, he became Sweden's youngest lecturer at Chalmers University of Technology in Gothenburg. The following year he published a book on computer programming, Modern Cobol, which was republished in four editions between 1969 and 1974. This was followed by another twenty textbooks in Assembly and BASIC, as well as various other technical manuals on operating systems and project management. He obtained a degree in IT, also at Lund University, chiefly examined on his own textbooks.

== Career ==
=== Financial advisor ===
In 1974, Roger Akelius published a book on how to make large returns using Swedish government bonds, Allt om premieobligationer. Instead of interest, the government paid the yield as a lottery.

The book became a bestseller and made the name Akelius known in Sweden. Akelius founded a company with forty employees that issued loans to their clients for acquiring government bonds, published a monthly magazine, and advised and helped acquire premium bonds.

In 1982, Roger Akelius released Akelius Skatt, a bestselling book explaining the tax system in a simple way so ordinary people could legally reduce their taxes, earning Akelius the reputation as a "Dr. Ruth of Swedish Tax Avoidance". In 1985, Akelius, together with Sievert Larsson, developed a computer program for tax declarations and calculations and founded a company, also called Akelius Skatt. The company employed roughly twenty lawyers and thirty programmers and, besides the tax software, offered a weekly tax newsletter to auditors and circa sixty conferences on tax education per year. The company expanded by developing professional books and applications for economists, accountants, and lawyers. Akelius sold the company in 1994, pivoting to real estate.

=== Akelius Insurance Ltd ===
In 1987, Roger Akelius founded Akelius Insurance Ltd in Cyprus, selling capital insurance policies as investments. The company saw success and grew rapidly, reaching fifty thousand customers and having fifty employees.

=== Real estate ===
In 1994, Roger Akelius founded Akelius Residential Property AB. The first property purchases were made in Gothenburg, Helsingborg and Trollhättan.

In 2017, Akelius Residential Property AB was named Sweden's second largest property owner with a value of SEK 66 billion, 500 employees and over 50,000 rental apartments in Sweden, Germany, the US, Canada, England, and France. Today, the company owns properties in nine metropolitan cities in Europe and North America. The company's business concept is to buy, renovate, and manage residential properties internationally.

In 2020, the United Nations Human Rights Council accused the company for abusing human rights, leaving tenants in unsafe construction sites without access to running water or heating for months. Akelius rejected the findings, with CEO Ralf Spann stating that the company had never "force(d) any tenant from their apartment" and referred to the claims against them as hearsay. Akelius stated that the United Nations favored "Cuba politics".

=== Philanthropy ===
Roger Akelius has donated 95 percent of his fortune to two charity foundations. 95 percent of the Akelius Group is owned by these foundations. The foundations donate chiefly to SOS Children's Villages, UNICEF, and Médecins Sans Frontières.

Akelius has donated 85 percent of Akelius Residential Property AB to one of the foundations, Akelius Foundation. The foundation is the world's largest donor to SOS Children's Villages, donating a total of over SEK 800 million to the organization.

The Akelius Foundation also develops language courses that are given to refugees via UNICEF and UNHCR following the Akelius own language pedagogy.

During the month of December 2016, Akelius matched every krona donated to Doctors Without Borders. A total of SEK 254 million was donated to the organization, of which Akelius accounted for SEK 127 million. The fundraising campaign meant a new Swedish fundraising record for Doctors Without Borders for one month.

In 2020, the foundation was criticized for tax avoidance. Akelius denied these claims, stating that he has paid "full taxes".

The value of Akelius’ donations to the two foundations is circa €8 billion.

== Personal life ==
Akelius has lived abroad since 1980, including in Cyprus, London, Berlin, Annecy, Almuñécar and The Bahamas.

Akelius has three children. His daughter, Anna-Maria Fuxén, was elected to the board of directors of Akelius Residential Property AB in 2003. He fired her in 2010 after she became a mother, stating to Swedish daily newspaper Expressen that "it is not possible to sit at a board meeting and breastfeed". That same week, Akelius sued her, demanding SEK 6.4 million back from her over a disagreement on whether the sum was a gift or a loan.

In a 2020 documentary by SVT, Akelius described himself as a "super capitalist".

In an interview with Swedish political magazine OmVärlden, Akelius argued that Sweden should support more refugees, and stated that the world needed more billionaires, as "they are the only ones that reduce poverty".
