= Hennes =

Hennes may refer to:

== Business ==
- H&M, a Swedish multi-national retail-clothing company
- Hennes (magazine), a Swedish magazine

== Places ==
- Hennes, Norway, a village in Hadsel municipality, Nordland county, Norway

== Music ==
- Hennes bästa, a compilation album from Swedish pop singer Lena Philipsson

== People ==
- Rainer Hennes (born 1943), a West German sprint canoer
- Tanja Schmidt-Hennes (born 1971), a former German professional cyclist
