= Swedish Clarté League =

The Swedish Clarté League (Swedish: Svenska Clartéförbundet) is a non-partisan socialist students' organisation in Sweden. It publishes a periodical with the same name, Clarté. The organization was established in 1921, and was in its first years notable for its resolute opposition to Fascism. It underwent a process of radicalisation in the 1970s, when it for a short period of time was openly affiliated with the Maoist Communist Party of Sweden. In 1982, the group was yet again declared to be independent of all political parties, but has since waned in importance and membership.
