= Let's Dance 2014 =

Season of television series

- Season 2014
- Celebrity winner: Benjamin Wahlgren Ingrosso
- Professional winner: Sigrid Bernson

Release
- Original network: TV4
- Original release: 28 February – 9 May 2014

Season chronology
- ← Previous; Let's Dance 2013 Next → Let's Dance 2015

Let's Dance 2014 was the ninth season of the Swedish celebrity dance show Let's Dance. The show was broadcast on TV4 and the hosts were David Hellenius and Jessica Almenäs. The judges were Dermot Clemenger, Ann Wilson and Tony Irving. Benjamin Wahlgren Ingrosso-- who danced with Sigrid Bernson--emerged as winner.

== Couples ==
Celebrity	Occupation	Professional partner	Status
Emma Igelström	Former Swimmer	Tobias Wallin	Eliminated 1st on 7 March 2014
Aristides "Phoenix" Denis-Sanchez	Gladiators Star	Veera Kinnunen	Eliminated 2nd on 14 March 2014
Glenn Hysén	Former Footballer	Jeanette Carlsson	Eliminated 3rd on 21 March 2014
Simon Kachoa	The Biggest Loser Star	Elisabeth Novotny	Eliminated 4th on 28 March 2014
Jasmine Kara	Singer	Stefano Oradei	Eliminated 5th on 4 April 2014
Lotta Engberg	Singer & TV Presenter	Alexander Svanberg	Eliminated 6th on 11 April 2014
Kenza Zouiten	Model	Calle Sterner	Eliminated 7th on 18 April 2014
Patrik Sjöberg	Former High-Jumper	Maria Bild	Eliminated 8th on 25 April 2014
Gunhild Carling	Jazz Musician	Kristjan Lootus	Third Place on 2 May 2014
Steffo Törnquist	Journalist	Cecilia Ehrling	Second Place on 9 May 2014
Benjamin Wahlgren Ingrosso	Singer	Sigrid Bernson	Winners on 9 May 2014

== Scoring Chart ==
Couple	Place	1	2	1+2	3	4	5	6	7	8	9	10	11
Benjamin & Sigrid	1	18	22	40	30	26	18+0=18	25+2=27	17+0=17	27+10=37	30+30=60	30+28=58	28+30+30=88
Steffo & Cecilia	2	10	14	24	10	21	20+2=22	21+0=21	23+4=27	17+8=25	22+24=46	26+19=45	27+27+30=84
Gunhild & Kristjan	3	10	19	29	21	15	11+0=11	21+0=21	23+0=23	30+12=42	26+21=47	25+27=52	
Patrik & Maria	4	8	7	15	13	11	10+0=10	18+0=18	14+0=14	15+6=21	10+12=22		
Kenza & Calle	5	12	16	28	18	20	30+6=36	20+6=26	24+4=28	25+4=29			
Lotta & Alexander	6	9	13	22	17	18	21+4=25	24+4=28	17+4=21				
Jasmine & Stefano	7	16	17	33	24	23	24+0=24	22+0=22					
Simon & Elisabeth	8	12	9	21	15	16	14+0=14						
Glenn & Jeanette	9	8	7	15	14	14							
Phoenix & Veera	10	13	17	30	15								
Emma & Tobias	11	7	6	13									

=== Highest and lowest scoring performances of the series ===
The best and worst performances in each dance according to the judges' marks are as follows:

Dance	Best dancer(s)	Best score	Worst dancer(s)	Worst score
Cha-Cha-Cha	Gunhild Carling	23	Lotta Engberg	9
Foxtrot	Steffo Törnquist	27	Glenn Hysén	8
Jive	Benjamin Wahlgren Ingrosso	30	Emma Igelström	6
Paso Doble	Benjamin Wahlgren Ingrosso	30	Steffo Törnquist; Patrik Sjöberg	10
Quickstep	Gunhild Carling	30	Steffo Törnquist	14
Rumba	Benjamin Wahlgren Ingrosso	25	Glenn Hysén	7
Samba	Steffo Törnquist	21	Patrik Sjöberg	11
Showdance	Steffo Törnquist; Benjamin Wahlgren Ingrosso	30		
Tango	Benjamin Wahlgren Ingrosso	28	Patrik Sjöberg	15
Waltz	Kenza Zouiten	30	Emma Igelström	7
Fusion	Benjamin Wahlgren Ingrosso	30	Patrik Sjöberg	12

== Average chart ==
Rank by average	Place	Couple	Total	Number of dances	Average
1	1	Benjamin & Sigrid	389	15	25.9
2	7	Jasmine & Stefano	126	6	21.0
3	3	Gunhild & Kristjan	249	12	20.8
4	2	Steffo & Cecilia	311	15	20.7
5	5	Kenza & Calle	165	8	20.6
6	6	Lotta & Alexander	119	7	17.0
7	10	Phoenix & Veera	45	3	15.0
8	8	Simon & Elisabeth	66	5	13.2
9	4	Patrik & Maria	118	10	11.8
10	9	Glenn & Jeanette	43	4	10.8
11	11	Emma & Tobias	13	2	6.5

== Call-out order ==
The table below lists the order in which the contestants' fates were revealed. The order of the safe couples does not reflect the viewer voting results.

Order	2	3	4	5	6	7	8	9	10	11
1	Benjamin & Sigrid	Benjamin & Sigrid	Benjamin & Sigrid						Benjamin & Sigrid	Benjamin & Sigrid
2	Jasmine & Stefano	Gunhild & Kristjan							Steffo & Cecilia	Steffo & Cecilia
3	Steffo & Cecilia	Lotta & Alexander						Steffo & Cecilia	Gunhild & Kristjan	
4	Gunhild & Kristjan	Patrik & Maria					Steffo & Cecilia	Patrik & Maria		
5	Phoenix & Veera	Jasmine & Stefano				Patrik & Maria	Kenza & Calle			
6	Kenza & Calle	Steffo & Cecilia			Patrik & Maria	Lotta & Alexander				
7	Glenn & Jeanette	Kenza & Calle	Patrik & Maria	Jasmine & Stefano	Jasmine & Stefano					
8	Simon & Elisabeth	Simon & Elisabeth	Kenza & Calle	Simon & Elisabeth						
9	Patrik & Maria	Glenn & Jeanette	Glenn & Jeanette							
10	Lotta & Alexander	Phoenix & Veera								
11	Emma & Tobias									

== Dance Chart ==
Couple	1	2	3	4	5		6		7		8		9		10		11		
Benjamin & Sigrid	Cha-Cha-Cha	Foxtrot	Paso Doble	Salsa	Waltz	Viennese Waltz	Rumba	Swing	Tango	Team Dance 1	Quickstep	Film Dance	Jive	Quickstep; Rumba	Hip-Hop	Tango	Quickstep	Paso Doble	Showdance
Steffo & Cecilia	Paso Doble	Quickstep	Rumba	Samba	Tango	Viennese Waltz	Jive	Swing	Foxtrot	Team Dance 2	Cha-Cha-Cha	Film Dance	Waltz	Foxtrot; Paso Doble	Jazz	Quickstep	Jive	Foxtrot	Showdance
Gunhild & Kristjan	Foxtrot	Rumba	Tango	Salsa	Paso Doble	Viennese Waltz	Waltz	Swing	Cha-Cha-Cha	Team Dance 1	Quickstep	Film Dance	Jive	Foxtrot; Cha-Cha-Cha	Disco	Paso Doble			
Patrik & Maria	Waltz	Jive	Foxtrot	Samba	Cha-Cha-Cha	Viennese Waltz	Quickstep	Swing	Rumba	Team Dance 1	Tango	Film Dance	Paso Doble	Tango; Rumba					
Kenza & Calle	Cha-Cha-Cha	Foxtrot	Paso Doble	Salsa	Waltz	Viennese Waltz	Rumba	Swing	Tango	Team Dance 2	Jive	Film Dance							
Lotta & Alexander	Cha-Cha-Cha	Foxtrot	Paso Doble	Samba	Waltz	Viennese Waltz	Rumba	Swing	Jive	Team Dance 2									
Jasmine & Stefano	Paso Doble	Quickstep	Rumba	Salsa	Tango	Viennese Waltz	Jive	Swing											
Simon & Elisabeth	Foxtrot	Rumba	Tango	Samba	Paso Doble	Viennese Waltz													
Glenn & Jeanette	Foxtrot	Rumba	Tango	Salsa															
Phoenix & Veera	Paso Doble	Quickstep	Rumba																
Emma & Tobias	Waltz	Jive																	
