= ARCHE Pachatak =

Belarusian magazine

- Founded: 1998
- Country: Belarus
- Based in: Minsk
- Language: Belarusian
- Website: arche.by
- ISSN: 1392-9682

ARCHE Pachatak is a Belarusian independent scientific, popular science, socio-political, and literary-artistic magazine, which positions itself as a free tribune of the Belarusian intelligentsia. The magazine was started in 1998 and is headquartered in Minsk. It is published mainly in classical Belarusian as well as in the official Belarusian language. The political orientation of the magazine is liberal. In addition to the texts written by Belarusian authors, the magazine also publishes translations of works by foreign historians, public and political figures. Arche is a word of Greek origin (ἀρχή), meaning "root cause", "something that underlies."

As of 2017, ARCHE Pachatak is one of three Belarusian publications invited to the network of European intellectual magazines "Eurozine," along with "Dzeislok," and pARTisan. It has been published since 1998. The magazine was founded by Andrey Dynko. As of 2012, the editor-in-chief is Alexander Pashkevich, previously Valery Bulgakov.

== Legal incidents ==
On February 25, 2009, the court of the Moskovsky district of the city of Brest, Belarus, declared the journal No. 7–8 to be extremist. In response, the international organization Reporters Without Borders noted that the administrative and judicial harassment of ARCHE Pachatak had begun since its inception in 1997. They stated that the legal pursuit is a poor progress for press freedom in Belarus.
