= Karin Alfredsson =

Swedish writer and journalist (born 1953)

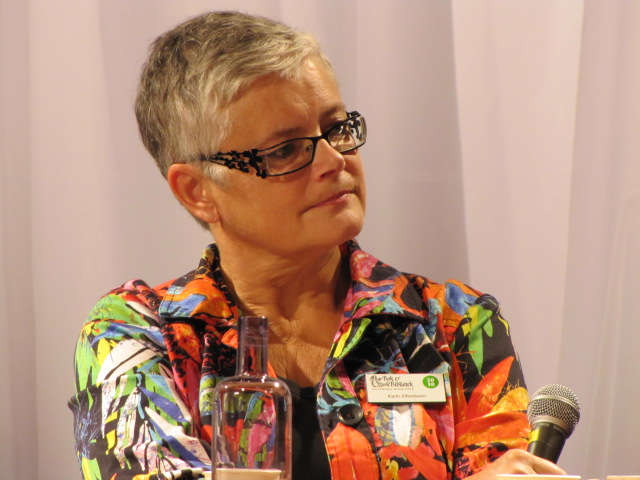
- Born: 1953 (age 72–73)
- Writing career
- Genres: Novel, essay

Karin Alfredsson (born 1953) is a Swedish writer and journalist.

In 1980 she was named as the editor-in-chief of Journalisten, publication of the Swedish Journalists Association. She wrote articles for the magazine OmVärlden. Alfredsson worked as an editor for several programs for the Swedish public broadcaster SVT. She was also a visiting journalism professor at Umeå University. She contributed to the anthology The Tattooed Girl: The Enigma of Stieg Larsson and the Secrets Behind the Most Compelling Thrillers of Our Time. Her books, including crime fiction, mainly deal with women's issues. She currently lives in Stockholm.

Alfredsson has been credited with being the main driving force during the 1980s in persuading the Swedish government to treat domestic violence more severely. She was the founder and head of "Cause of Death: Woman", a non-governmental project to stop violence against women which was active in ten countries.

== Selected works ==
Her major work include:

- Den man älskar agar man?, on violence against women (1979) ("The person that you love you hurt?")
- 80 grader från Varmvattnet, crime novel (2006), received the Swedish Crime Writers' Academy debutante award, translated into English as Beauty, Blessing and Hope
- Kvinnorna på 10:e våningen, crime novel (2008), translated into English as The Woman on the 10th floor
- Klockan 21:37, crime novel (2009), translated into English as 9:37 pm
- Den sjätte gudinnan, crime novel (2010), translated into English as The Sixth Goddess
- Pojken i hiss 54, crime novel (2011), translated into English as The Boy in Elevator 54
