= Intellectum =

Intellectum is a biannual academic journal that was established in 2006 by the non-profit Intellectum scientific society. It is a member of the Eurozine network. The hard-copy publication is in Greek, while the online edition is bilingual, with many articles and interviews translated in English. The editor-in-chief is Victor Tsilonis.

Interviews include the former chief prosecutor of International Criminal Tribunal for the former Yugoslavia, Carla Del Ponte, political scientist Ernesto Laclau, philosopher David S. Oderberg, forensic anthropologist Sue Black, Scottish writer Paul Johnston, poet Haris Vlavianos, professor of communication studies Richard Katula, professor of international criminal law and human rights William Schabas, writer Panos Theodorides, and journalist Stelios Kouloglou.
