= Eva Helen Ulvros =

Swedish historian and author (born 1954)

Eva Helen Ulvros (born 1954) is a Swedish historian and author. She is a professor at the University of Lund, where she specializes in the social development of gender identity and cultural aspects of history in Sweden. She is a native of Lund.

== Professional background ==
Ulvros has taught at the University of Lund since 1996. She has additionally taught courses at Lund's Centre for Gender Studies. Since 2008, she has held the title of professor in Lund University's history department.

== Published works ==
- Ulvros, Eva Helen (1996). Fruar och mamseller. Kvinnor inom sydsvensk borgerlighet 1790–1870 [Wives and Young Ladies. Women in the Middle Classes in Southern Sweden, 1790–1870] (Doctoral thesis) (in Swedish). Lund: Historiska Media, Lund. ISBN 9789197199230.
- Ulvros, Eva Helen (1998). Kärlekens Villkor: Tre Kvinnoöden 1780-1880 [Conditions of Love: Three women 1780-1880] (in Swedish). Lund: Historiska Media. ISBN 9789188930217.
- Ulvros, Eva Helen (2001). Sophie Elkan: Hennes Liv Och Vänskapen Med Selma Lagerlöf [Sophie Elkan: Her life and friendship with Selma Lagerlöf] (in Swedish). Lund: Historiska Media. ISBN 9789189442153.
- Ulvros, Eva Helen; Harrison, Dick (2003). Historiebok för kakälskare [A Cookie Lover's History Book] (in Swedish). Lund: Historiska media. ISBN 9789189442740.
- Ulvros, Eva Helen (2004). Dansens och tidens virvlar : om dans och lek i Sveriges historia [In the Whirls of Dance: Dance and play in Swedish History] (in Swedish). Lund: Historiska Media. ISBN 9789185057306.
- Ulvros, Eva Helen (2007). Oscar I: en biografi [Oscar I: A Biography] (in Swedish). Lund: Historiska media. ISBN 9789185507108.
- Ulvros, Eva Helen (2010). Carl Swartz. Sveriges statsministrar under 100 år (in Swedish). Stockholm: Albert Bonniers Förlag. ISBN 9789100119799.
