= Dialogi =

Cultural magazine in Slovenia

- Categories: Cultural magazine
- Frequency: Bimonthly
- Publisher: Aristej Publishing House
- Founded: 1965
- Country: Slovenia
- Based in: Maribor
- Language: Slovene
- ISSN: 0012-2068
- OCLC: 1664117

Dialogi (Slovene: Dialogues) is a bimonthly cultural magazine which has been in circulation since 1965. The magazine is based in Maribor, Slovenia.

== History and profile ==
Dialogi was established in Maribor in 1965. The founding company was Obzorje Publishing House. The magazine became extremely popular shortly after its start, and its popularity continued during the 1970s.

Dialogi covered both literary work and culture-oriented articles until 1994 when the Aristej Publishing House began to publish it. Since then Dialogi has included materials addressing both Slovenian and international readers. Its content mostly contain articles on civil society and culture. The magazine features thematic issues in addition to original and translated fiction. It also publishes poems. The summary of the articles are given in English.

Dialogi appeared on a monthly basis from 1994, and later, its frequency was switched to bimonthly. As of 2018 Emica Antončič was the editor-in-chief of the magazine which has been a member of the Eurozine since April 1999.
