= Äntligen Hemma =

Swedish interior design magazine

Äntligen Hemma was a Swedish interior design magazine founded in 1999 by LRF Media. It was merged with another magazine, Din trädgård, in 2004 to create the present-day design magazine Drömhem och Trädgård.

In 2013, the magazine was sold to Aller Media.
