= Eurozine =

Network of European cultural magazines

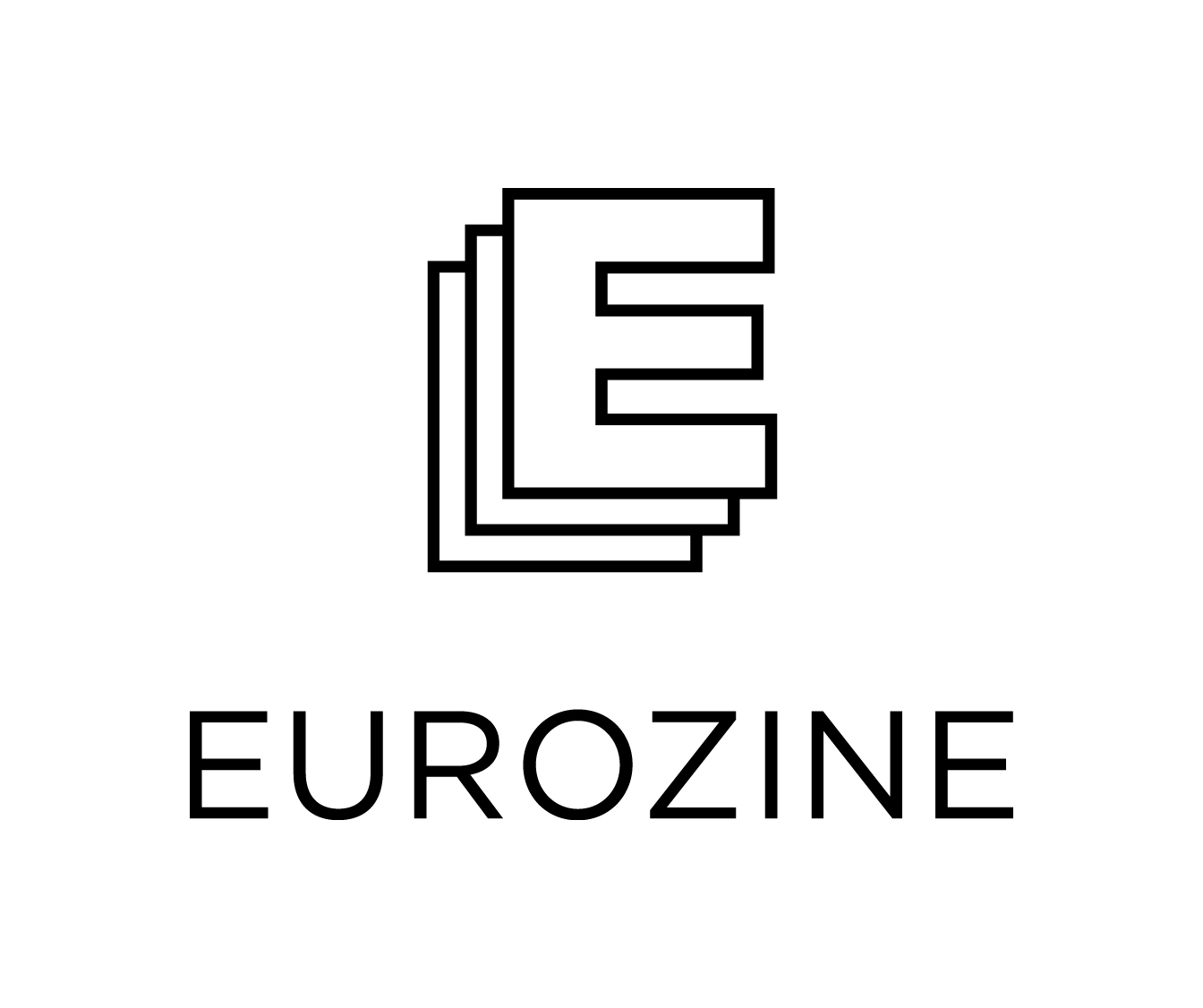
- Website type: Network and online magazine
- Available in: English (French, German)
- Owner: Eurozine
- Creator: Eurozine
- Website: www.eurozine.com
- Commercial: No
- Launched: 1983 (network), 1998 (magazine)

Eurozine is a network of European cultural magazines based in Vienna, linking up more than 90 partner journals and just as many associated magazines and institutions from nearly all European countries. Eurozine is also an online magazine which publishes original articles and selected articles from its partner journals with additional translations into one of the major European languages.

By providing a Europe-wide overview of current themes and discussions, Eurozine offers information for an international readership and facilitates communication and exchange between authors and intellectuals from Europe and worldwide. Eurozine is a non-profit institution, its office is based in Vienna and headed by managing director Maximilian Lehner.

== History ==
Eurozine emerged from an informal network dating back to 1983. Since that time, editors of various European cultural magazines have met once a year in European cities to exchange ideas and experiences.

In 1995, the meeting took place in Vienna. The success of this meeting, in which numerous eastern European magazines participated for the first time, and the rapid development of the Internet, encouraged the editors to reinforce the existing loose network with a virtual but more systematic one. Eurozine was established in 1998.

Today, Eurozine hosts the "European Meeting of Cultural Journals" each year together with one or more of its partners.

The magazines Kritika & Kontext (Bratislava), Mittelweg 36 (Hamburg), Ord&Bild (Gothenburg), Revista Crítica de Ciências Sociais (Coimbra), Transit - Europäische Revue (Vienna), and Wespennest (Vienna) are Eurozine's founders.

== Partner journals ==
(by countries, as of February 2016)

Albania

- Mehr Licht!
- Poeteka
- Symbol

Austria

- Dérive
- L'Homme
- Springerin
- Wespennest
- Transit

Belarus

- ARCHE Pachatak
- Dziejaslou
- pARTisan

Belgium

- A Prior Magazine
- La Revue nouvelle

Bosnia and Herzegovina

- Sarajevo Notebook

Bulgaria

- Critique & Humanism

Croatia

- Frakcija
- Nova Istra

Czech Republic

- A2
- Host
- Revolver Revue
- RozRazil

Denmark

- Lettre Internationale (Denmark)
- Passage

Estonia

- Akadeemia
- Vikerkaar

Finland

- Nuori Voima
- Ny Tid (Finland)

France

- Esprit
- Multitudes
- Sens public

Germany

- Blätter für deutsche und internationale Politik
- Gegenworte
- Merkur
- Mittelweg 36
- Osteuropa
- Polar

Greece

- Intellectum

Hungary

- 2000
- Magyar Lettre Internationale

Italy

- Il Mulino
- Lettera internazionale
- Reset

Latvia

- Rigas Laiks
- Studija

Lithuania

- Kulturos barai

North Macedonia

- Roots

Norway

- Le Monde diplomatique (Oslo)
- Samtiden
- Syn og Segn
- Vagant

Poland

- Krytyka Polityczna
- Kultura Liberalna
- New Eastern Europe
- Res Publica Nowa

Portugal

- Artistas Unidos Revista
- Revista Crítica de Ciências Sociais

Romania

- Dilema veche

Russia

- Neprikosnovennij Zapas (NZ)
- New Literary Observer

Serbia

- Belgrade Journal of Media and Communications
- Beton
- Genero

Slovakia

- Kritika & Kontext

Slovenia

- Dialogi
- Razpotja
- Sodobnost

Spain

- L'Espill
- Letras Libres

Sweden

- Arena
- Fronesis
- Glänta
- Ord och Bild

Turkey

- Cogito (Turkey)
- Varlik
- K24 (magazine)

Ukraine

- Krytyka
- Prostory
- Spilne

United Kingdom

- Index on Censorship
- Mute
- New Humanist
- Soundings
