= Miljöaktuellt =

Swedish environmental and business magazine (1973–2016)

- Editor-in-chief: Mikael Salo
- Categories: Environmental magazine; Business magazine
- Frequency: Monthly
- Founded: 1973
- Final issue: 2016
- Company: Bonnier Business Media
- Country: Sweden
- Based in: Stockholm
- Language: Swedish
- Website: Miljöaktuellt
- ISSN: 0345-763X

Miljöaktuellt was a monthly environmental and business magazine published in Stockholm, Sweden. It existed between 1973 and 2016. It was subtitled as Naturvårdsverkets tidning until 2015.

== History and profile ==
Miljöaktuellt was first published in Solna in 1973. Its headquarters was moved to Stockholm in 1995. The magazine was published eleven issues per year on a monthly basis.

Miljöaktuellt was published by Naturvårdsverket, and during this period it was official organ of the Swedish Environmental Protection Agency. The magazine was redesigned on 14 May 2003 to cover more content from the Agency. Because it had been an independent publication and the agency did not have any influence on its content until that date.

Its publisher was the International Data Group (IDG) Sweden from 2007 to 2015. Bonnier bought the magazine in September 2015. Its headquarters was in Stockholm.

The magazine dealt with environmental issues and offered business-like solutions focusing on social responsibility and sustainable development. During its existence the magazine published the list of the most influential people on environmental issues in Sweden. The other ranking by the magazine was the Environment Municipality of the Year.

Mikael Salo was the editor-in-chief of Miljöaktuellt.

In 2008 Miljöaktuellt had 19,000 readers. In 2016 the magazine ceased publication.

== See also ==
- List of magazines in Sweden
