= Bilsport =

Swedish automobile magazine

Bilsport (meaning Autosport in English) is an automobile magazine published in Karlskrona, Sweden.

== History and profile ==
Bilsport was founded in 1962. The magazine is published by Albinsson & Sjöberg on a biweekly basis. It is based in Karlskrona. The magazine presents Bilsport Awards.

In 2014 the circulation of Bilsport was 19,600 copies.

== See also ==
List of magazines in Sweden
