= Fronesis (magazine) =

Swedish political magazine

- Categories: Political magazine; Cultural magazine
- Frequency: Quarterly
- Founded: 1998
- Country: Sweden
- Based in: Malmö
- Language: Swedish
- Website: Fronesis
- ISSN: 1404-2614
- OCLC: 724735501

Fronesis is a quarterly socialist and cultural magazine based in Malmö, Sweden. The magazine has been in circulation since 1998. Its subtitle is Politik. Teori. Kritik. (Swedish: Politics. Theory. Criticism.).

== History and profile ==
Fronesis was established in 1998. Its headquarters is in Malmö. It is published on a quarterly basis. The magazine covers critical articles on politics, theory, and critique. It also features articles about culture.

In 2004 Fronesis was named as the cultural journal of the year in Sweden. In 2006 it became the member of Eurozine.

== See also ==
- List of magazines in Sweden
