= Akelius =

Real Estate Company

Akelius Residential Property AB
- Type: Aktiebolag
- Industry: Real estate
- Founder: Roger Akelius
- Headquarters: Stockholm, Sweden
- Key people: Ralf Spann, CEO
- Website: https://www.akelius.com/

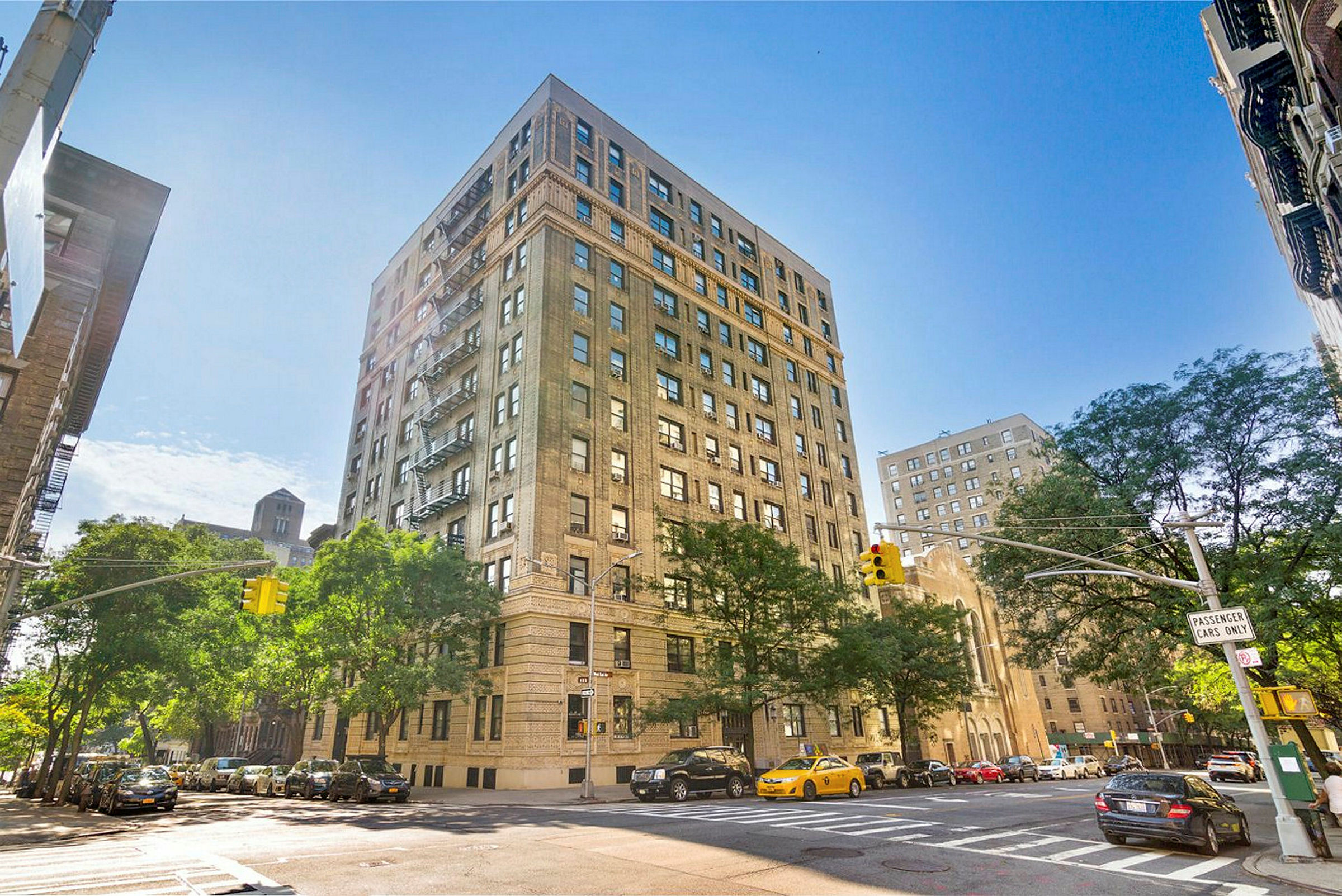
Akelius apartment building in New York

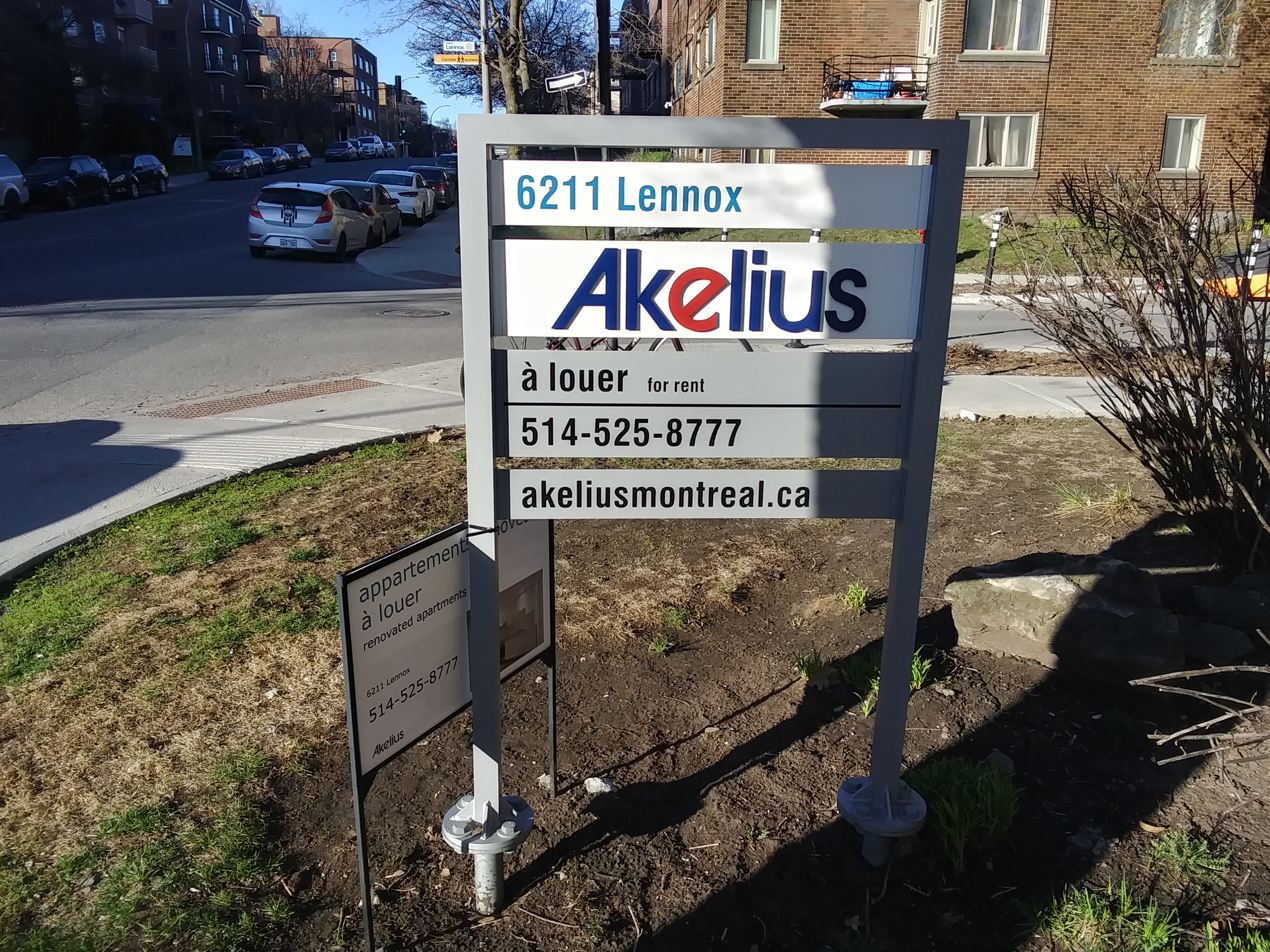
Akelius lawn advertising for units on Lennox and Van Horne in Montreal

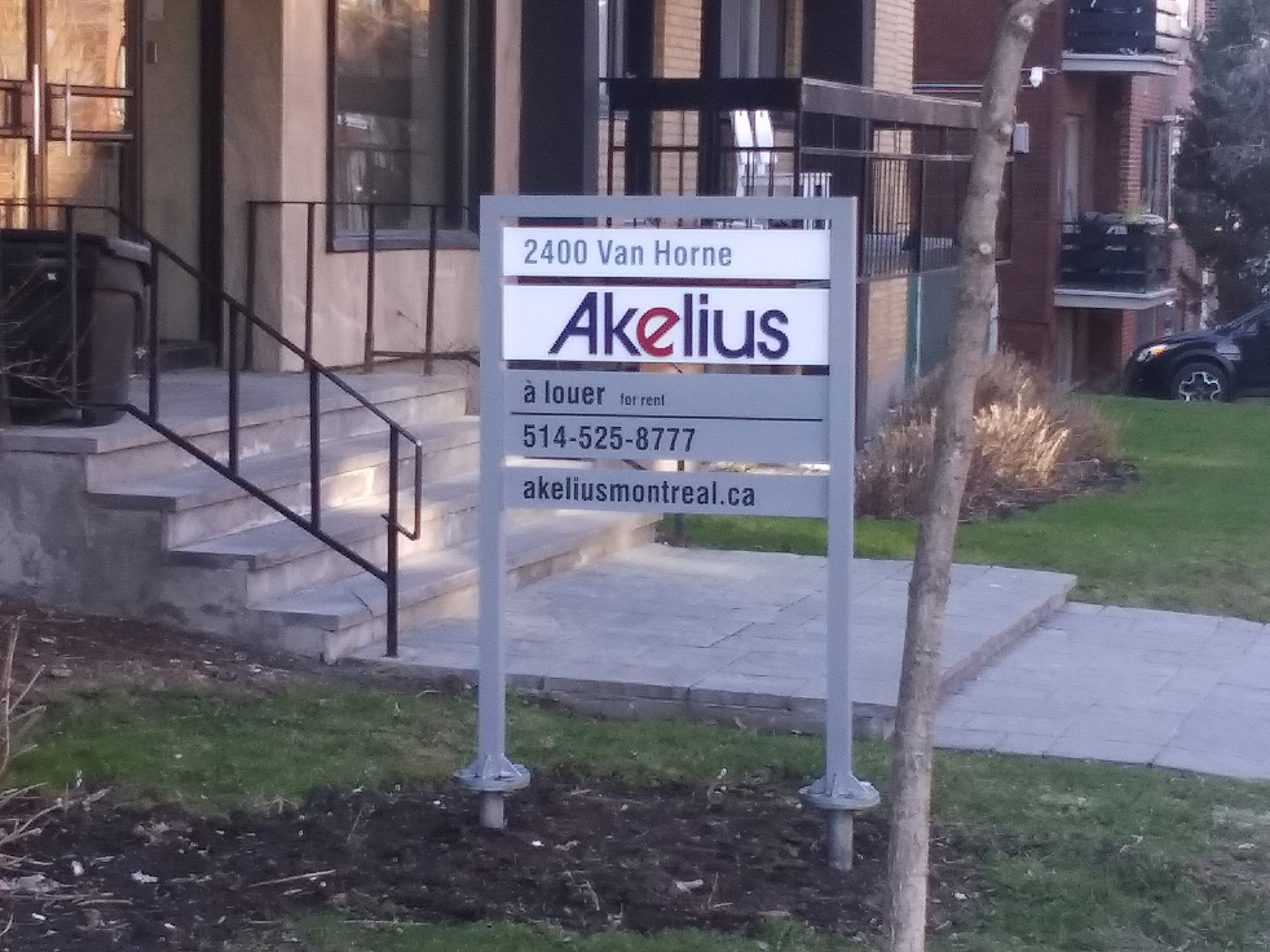
Akelius lawn sign advertising units for rent in a building on Van Horne in Montreal

Akelius Residential Property AB (Akelius Fastigheter until spring 2014) is an international residential real-estate company registered in Sweden. Akelius Residential Property owns nineteen thousand rental apartments in New York, Boston, Washington D.C., Austin, Toronto, Montreal, Ottawa, Quebec City, Paris, and London.

The main shareholder of Akelius Residential Property AB is the Akelius Foundation with 85 percent, whose founder is the Swedish founder Akelius AB, Roger Akelius. The foundation is registered as a non-profit organization in Cyprus. The foundation is listed in the ICIJ's offshore leaks database.

The company reacted to the Berlin government's rent cap in 2020 by adding "shadow rents" on leases, some of which were five times higher than the listed rent, which were to be paid retrospectively if the law were not to endure. The rent cap was ruled unconstitutional in 2021; Akelius stated that they sought to reclaim the excess money from tenants. In response, the Berlin government provided a €10 million fund of interest-free loans to tenants struggling to make repayments.

In April 2020, the United Nations Human Rights Council accused Akelius of human rights abuses. The UN Special Rapporteur on the right to adequate housing claimed that the company practiced renovictions to circumvent rent-control regulations and left residents living in unsafe construction sites for months, sometimes without access to running water or central heating.

Akelius properties worldwide (accurate as of February 2022)
city	number of residential units
London	2,228
Paris	1,563
Toronto	4,283
Montreal	4,076
Boston	1,029
New York	1,745
Washington, D.C.	2,610
Austin	861

== Akelius Foundation ==
The main shareholder of Akelius Residential Property AB is the Akelius Foundation with 85 percent. Akelius Foundation is a large donor to UNICEF, SOS Children's Villages, and other charities. The language and mathematics courses are part of the foundation's cooperation with UNICEF. The courses are used in refugee camps around the world. 3,200 teachers use Akelius Foundation's courses through UNICEF and UNHCR.

The Akelius Foundation has donated EUR 125 million to UNICEF, SOS Children's Villages, Doctors without Borders, and UNHCR from 2017 to 2022. The organization has long-term commitments to four projects with SOS Children's Villages. Each project runs for 25 years and has received SEK 100 million.

Following the start of the Russian invasion of Ukraine, in March 2022, the foundation launched a campaign to match all Swedish donations to UNICEF and UNHCR, raising SEK 1.7 billion, of which the foundation donated SEK 700 million. The Akelius Foundation and UNICEF collaborated on the Akelius Digital Language Learning Course to help Ukrainian refugee children catch up on language learning, integrate into national education systems in the receiving countries.

=== History ===
In 1994, the company acquired its first residential properties in Helsingborg, Gothenburg, and Trollhättan. The company experienced rapid growth in 2001 when it acquired properties worth 3 billion Swedish kronor. Akelius Residential Property AB acquired its first properties outside of Sweden in Berlin and Hamburg in 2006. In 2007, Roger Akelius donated his shares in Akelius Apartment Ltd to the Akelius Foundation, which indirectly became the main owner of the company. Following the change of ownership, the company continued to expand, acquiring properties in Toronto, London, Paris, Montreal, New York, and Copenhagen. In 2021, Akelius Residential Property AB sold all its properties in Scandinavia and Germany to focus on other markets. By the end of 2021 and 2022, the company acquired its first properties in Austin, Quebec City, and Ottawa.
