= Handelsnytt =

Swedish trade magazine

- Editor-in-chief: Helena Rönnberg
- Categories: Trade magazine
- Frequency: Seven issues a year
- Circulation: 150 000
- Founded: 1907
- Company: LO Mediehus
- Country: Sweden
- Based in: Malmö (1907–1999); Stockholm (1999–)
- Language: Swedish
- Website: Handelsnytt
- ISSN: 0017-7326

Handelsnytt (Swedish: News of Commerce) is a monthly trade union magazine based in Stockholm, Sweden.

== History and profile ==
The magazine was established in 1907 with the title Handelsarbetaren (Swedish: Commercial Employee). The current title was adopted in 1951. The magazine was started in Malmö, but it was moved to Stockholm in 1999.

Handelsnytt is published seven times a year and is the official media outlet of the Union of Commercial Employees. As of 2020 Helena Rönnberg is the editor-in-chief. Handelsnytt covers articles concerning industry news from the perspective of employees. The magazine focuses on the topics such as work-life balance, equal opportunities and salaries.

In 2025 Handelsnytt had a circulation of 150 000 copies.

== See also ==
- List of magazines in Sweden
