= Hänt Extra =

Weekly celebrity magazine in Sweden

- Editor-in-chief: Bo Liljeberg
- Categories: Celebrity magazine Youth magazine
- Frequency: Weekly
- Circulation: 120,700 (2014)
- Publisher: Aller Media AB
- Founded: 1986; 40 years ago
- Company: Aller Media
- Country: Sweden
- Based in: Stockholm
- Language: Swedish
- ISSN: 0283-7129
- OCLC: 243923361

Hänt Extra is a Swedish language weekly celebrity and youth magazine published by Aller Media in Stockholm, Sweden.

== History and profile ==
Hänt Extra was established in 1986. The magazine is part of Aller Media. It is published by Aller Media AB and is based in Stockholm. Bo Liljeberg is the editor-in-chief of the magazine.

The circulation of Hänt Extra was 129,000 copies in 2007. The magazine had a circulation of 120,700 copies in 2014.

== See also ==
- List of magazines in Sweden
