= Adrian Molin =

Swedish far-right writer and political activist

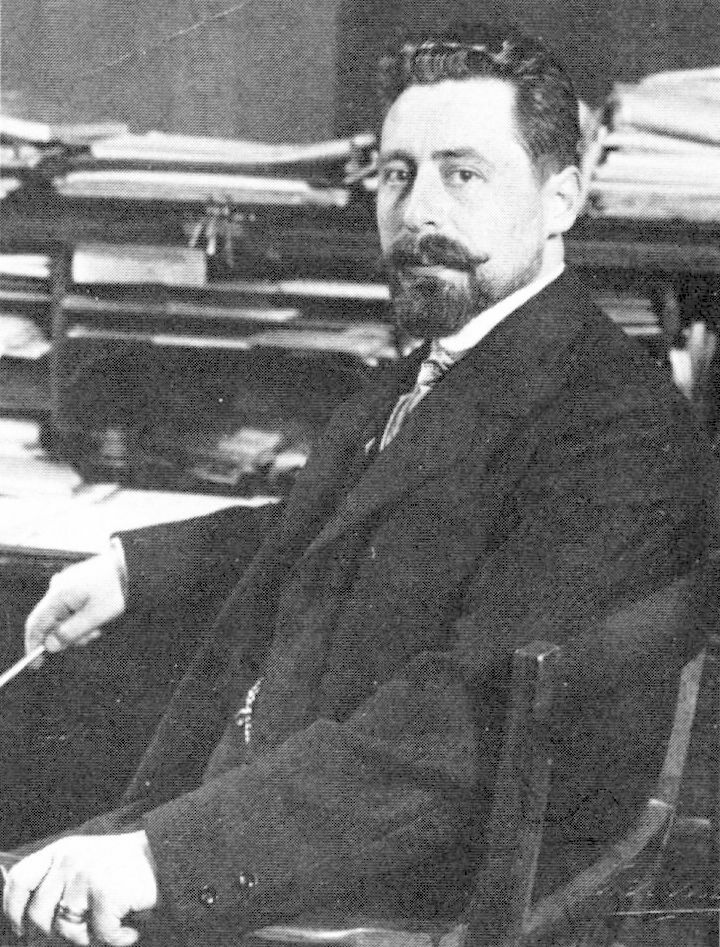
Adrian Molin

Adrian Leopold Molin (5 March 1880 – 10 August 1942) was a Swedish far-right writer and political activist.

== Early ideas ==
Born in Varberg, Molin attended the University of Gothenburg and received his doctorate from the institution in 1906. He then joined the right-wing Göteborgs Aftonblad, then the Svenska Dagbladet before setting up his own monthly in 1907, the Det Nya Sverige, which continued until 1926. The young Molin was a disciple of Rudolf Kjellén and a leading figure in the so-called 'Young Right' movement. Ideologically he was highly conservative socially but also anti-capitalist. Molin flirted with corporatism by supporting an occupational franchise as well as some state intervention designed to bring the working class into a national consensus. He combined these ideas with a hatred of both socialism and the Russian Empire.

== Fascism and Nazism ==
His main political involvement was a founder and leading figure in the National Society Against Emigration, set up in 1907 to oppose the drain of Sweden's population to, mainly, the USA. In this capacity he edited its publication Hem i Sverige and advocated widespread home ownership and the settlement of northern Sweden to stem the flow of migrants from the country. He also supported the building of traditional rural dwellings based on the use of indigenous architecture as part of his fascination with traditional ruralism. Heavily influenced by the philosopher Vitalis Norström, he became highly pro-Germany and showed characteristics of an early form of fascism.

During the 1920s and 1930s his ruralism began to develop along lines reminiscent of the blood and soil rhetoric of the Nazi Party. Soon Molin became a supporter of Nazism and hoped to apply its principles to Sweden, although he dismissed the indigenous Nazi leader Birger Furugård as a 'parody' of the ideology. His own political activity was restricted to the National Youth League of Sweden, where he became a leading voice on the far right, Nazi wing.

Near the end of his life Molin's enthusiasm for Adolf Hitler cooled as he became disillusioned with some of the excesses of Nazi Germany. However he retained his admiration for their anti-Semitism, hierarchical society and especially the ruralism endorsed by the likes of Richard Walther Darré. It was these themes, as well as his desire for a union of Sweden and Norway as a defensive move against the Soviet Union, that dominated his writings until his death in Lidingö.
