= Vår bostad =

Monthly family magazine in Sweden (1924–2006)

- Former editors: Ulla Lindström; Ulrica Ambjörn
- Categories: Family magazine
- Frequency: Monthly
- Publisher: Hyresgästernas Förlag
- Founded: 1924
- Final issue: 2006
- Company: HSB; Hyresgästernas Riksförbund
- Country: Sweden
- Based in: Stockholm
- Language: Swedish
- ISSN: 0042-2002
- OCLC: 9922998

Vår bostad (Swedish: Our Dwelling) was a monthly family magazine published in Stockholm, Sweden, between 1924 and 2006.

== History and profile ==
Vår bostad was started in 1924. Between 1935 and early 1937 the title of the magazine was Hus och Härd. The magazine was jointly owned by the Swedish tenant organizations, HSB (Tenant Owners Cooperation) and Hyresgästernas Riksförbund. It was sent to the members of the organizations. The magazine, based in Stockholm, was published by Hyresgästernas Förlag on a monthly basis.

Swedish social democrat politician Ulla Lindström was the long-term editor-in-chief of Vår bostad which she held between 1937 and 1946. Ulrica Ambjörn also served as the editor-in-chief of the magazine, which ceased publication in 2006.

== Circulation ==
In 2001 Vår bostad had a circulation of 972,000 copies. It was the second most read magazine in Sweden in 2005. The circulation of the magazine was 934,000 copies in 2006.

== See also ==
- List of Swedish magazines
