= Steffo Törnquist =

Swedish journalist, author, producer and television presenter (born 1956)

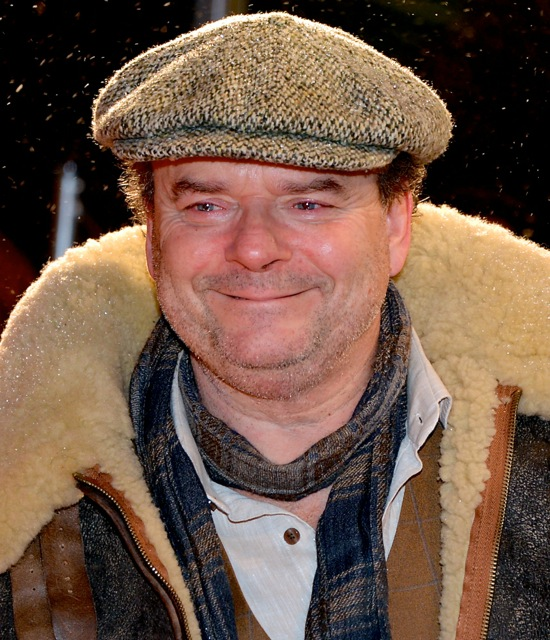
- Törnquist at the Swedish premiere of Jack Reacher in 2012
- Born: Bo-Stefan Törnquist; 12 January 1956 (age 69); Linköping, Sweden
- Occupation(s): Journalist, author, producer, television presenter

Bo-Stefan "Steffo" Törnquist (born 12 January 1956) is a Swedish journalist, author, producer and television presenter. He is known for his television shows Steffos lustjakt and Steffo – din tröst i natten, both on TV4.

== Career ==
Törnquist hosted Steffos lustjakt and Steffo – din tröst i natten on TV4 in 1992 and 1993. Since 2000, he has been the host of Nyhetsmorgon on TV4, co-hosting with Jenny Strömstedt. He has had a long career with different news agencies, and in 1990 he took part in the creation of TV4's first hosting of TV4 News and TV4 Sport broadcasts. Between 1993 and 1995, he worked as a news reporter for Nyheterna on TV4. From 1995 to 2002, he worked as a producer for a number of documentaries amongst them, En svensk krigare i Vietnam, Djävulens lotteri (about Louise Hoffsten), and Sprit all for TV4.

In late 2012, Törnquist released the book Steffos spritbibel. In 2003, he made the documentary Bengt Elde – mannen med den snälla penseln, and in 2012 he interviewed Jackie Arklöv serving a life sentence. He sits on the board of directors for Bomans Hotel, and also the Wine and liquor museum in Djurgården, Stockholm. He has also authored the book Njut! En bok om små saker som gör livet stort about enjoying life and living the "good life".

Törnquist was a contestant on Let's Dance 2014 on TV4 competing as a celebrity dancer. He danced alongside professional dancer Cecilia Ehrling. The pair finished in second place, behind winners Benjamin Wahlgren Ingrosso and Sigrid Bernson. During Törnquist's time on the show, he lost 12 kg in body weight.
