= Gunhild Carling =

Swedish jazz musician (born 1975)

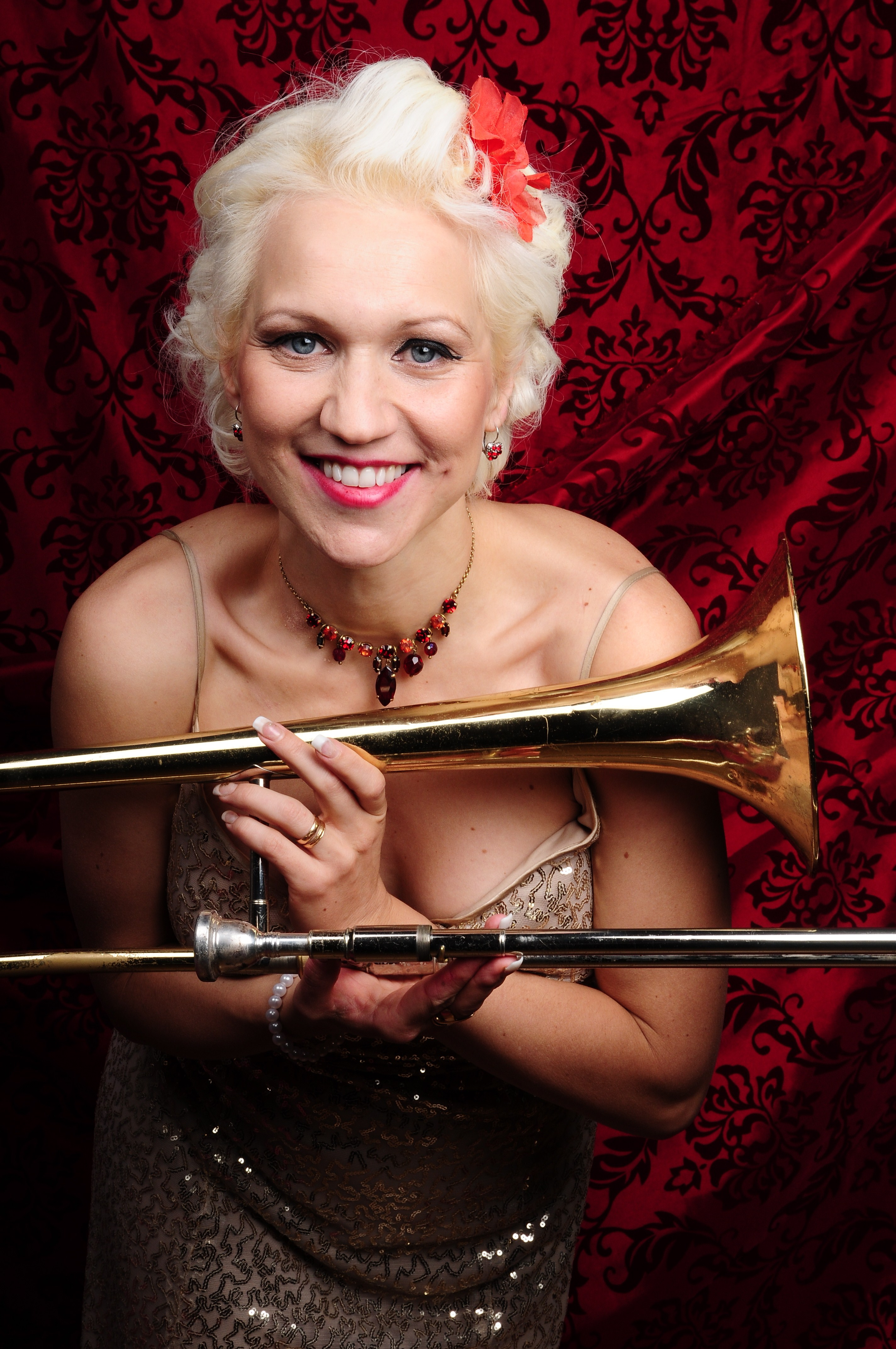
- Carling in 2009

Background information
- Born: 7 May 1975 (age 51); Gothenburg, Sweden
- Genre: Jazz
- Instruments: Trombone; bagpipes; trumpet; recorder; euphonium; vocals; harp; piano; flute; harmonica; saxophone; guitar; double bass; ukulele; banjo

Gunhild Carling (born 7 May 1975) is a Swedish jazz musician and multi-instrumentalist. She plays the trombone, trumpet and many other instruments.

== Career ==
Carling became known for her performance at Allsång på Skansen on 20 July 2010. The same year she became an expert commentator for Dansbandskampen at SVT. Carling plays trombone, bagpipes, trumpet, recorder, string instruments (such as banjo, ukulele and harp), and will often showcase all of her skills in one song, sometimes casually breaking into a tap dance or singing. Carling competed as a celebrity dancer in Let's Dance 2014 on TV4, being placed third.

In 2013 she performed with her Carling Big Band at the Royal Palace in Stockholm in the celebration of King Carl XVI Gustaf's Ruby Jubilee. In 2016 Carling performed at King Carl XVI Gustaf's 70th birthday celebration.

She was featured as a singer and multi-instrumentalist in several of Scott Bradlee's Postmodern Jukebox's adaptations of pop songs, which include a jazz swing version of Rick Astley's "Never Gonna Give You Up", a 1920s jazz swing version of "Material Girl", a vintage jazz version of Europe's "The Final Countdown", a jazz cover of Pharrell Williams' "Happy" in which she demonstrated her multi-instrumentality by playing ten instruments, and a 1920s hot jazz cover of ABBA's "Dancing Queen".

In 2016 she was featured at TEDxArendal, speaking about and playing trombone, which she has said is her favorite instrument. In 2024 she presented at TEDxPaloAlto with a talk tracing the history of the jazz trumpet. Carling often expresses her affection and respect for artists from early jazz, and especially the seminal New Orleans period. Among others, she refers to the influences of Louis Armstrong, Freddie Keppard, Jelly Roll Morton, Bix Beiderbecke, and Billie Holiday. Holiday's influence is potent in Carling's singing style.

In 2003 Carling married Johan Blomé, who does photography and video production and also plays multiple instruments. She often performs with their children, daughter Idun Blomé and son Viggo Blomé. Beginning as a child, she has also performed many times with her siblings, sister Gerd and brothers Max and Ulf. They initially played with their musical parents Aina and Hans Carling, and the former continues to be a frequent member of her music troupe. In 2016 the "wonder woman of Jazz" explained the development of her talents and career:

I haven’t ever been to a music teacher. I come from a family that plays music. I grew up in the south of Sweden, outside of Malmö. Our house was full of variety – circus, acting, dance, vaudeville and novelty. I just picked up instruments from when I was very young and played them. I started with the drums, then the recorder, trombone and trumpet. Then I started tap dancing, and after that harmonica and bagpipe. Later, I began composing music.

Carling does much of the artwork for her promotional materials.

In 2018 Carling moved to northern California with her family. She had performances scheduled throughout the United States, she also often performs live via online social media.

Several Carling videos have exceeded one million views. Her recorded albums are available as commercial CDs and digital downloads and on streaming services.

== Discography ==
=== Albums ===
- I Lost My Heart in Dixieland, The Carling Family Hot Five (1985)
- The Carling Family Hot Six, The Carling Family Hot Six (1987)
- That's My Desire, Gunhild Carling and her Swing Band (2002)
- Red Hot Jam, Gunhild Carling (2003)
- 20th Jubilee, Carling Family (2004)

Banjo, Guitar, Aina Carling; Clarinet, Tenor Saxophone, Violin, Max Carling; Drums, Ulf Carling; Piano, Trombone, Alto Saxophone, Gerd Carling; Trombone, Trumpet, Recorder, Vocals, Harmonica, Gunhild Carling; Trumpet, Piano, Hans Carling

- Magic Swing!, Gunhild Carling and the Carling Big Band (2007)
- Hot Jazz, Carling Family (2009)

Banjo, Guitar, Aina Carling; Clarinet, Tenor Saxophone, Violin, Max Carling; Contrabass – Tomas Carling; Drums, Ulf Carling; Piano, Trombone, Alto Saxophone, Gerd Carling; Trombone, Trumpet, Recorder, Vocals, Harmonica, Gunhild Carling; Trumpet, Piano, Hans Carling

- Jul Därhemma, Gunhild Carling (2011)
- Varieté, Gunhild Carling and the Carling Big Band (2014)
- Swing Out, Gunhild Carling and the Carling Big Band (2014)
- Big Apple, Gunhild Carling and the Carling Big Band (2015)
- Harlem Joy, Gunhild Carling and the Carling Big Band (2015)
- Good Evening Cats!, Gunhild Carling (2022)
- Happy Christmas, Gunhild Carling (2023)
- Jazz Odyssey, Carling Family (2024)
- Jazz Is My Lifestyle, Gunhild Carling Big Band with Strings (2024)

=== Singles and EPs ===
- "Baby It's Cold Outside", Christer Sjögren, Pernilla Wahlgren & Gunhild Carling (2011)
- "Winter's Day", Gunhild Carling (2011)

== Awards ==
- 1985 – The Louis Armstrong Scholarship
- 2006 – Kobe Jazz Street Award
- 2009 – The SKAP Scholarship
- 2009 – The Anita O'Day Award
- 2010 – Malmö Stads Glädjespridare
- 2011 – Honorary citizenship in Eslöv, Sweden
- 2014 – Scanian of the Year
- 2016 – The Thore Ehrling Scholarship
