= Teknisk Tidskrift =

Defunct magazines published in Sweden

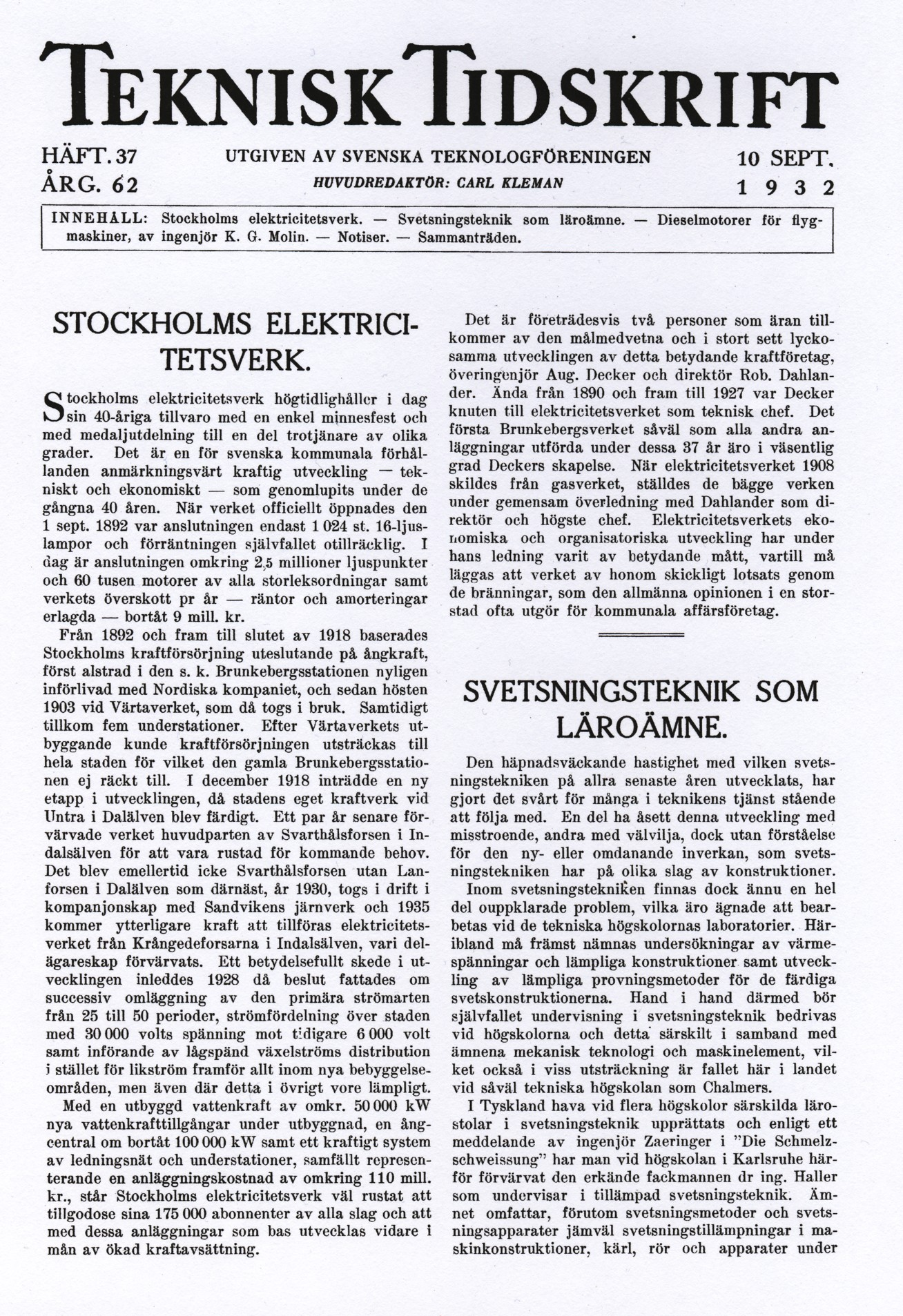
Teknisk Tidskrift (1932)

Teknisk Tidskrift (1871 – March 1872 Illustrerad Teknisk Tidning) was founded in 1871 by Swedish marine engineer Wilhelm Hoffstedt (1841–1907). A forerunner to Ny Teknik, it has since its establishment been considered one of the leading journals in Sweden for the publication of findings in technology and engineering. It was first published in Norrköping and then in Stockholm until 1977 when it folded.

The journal was divided into a general part and various specialized sections on mechanical engineering, electrical engineering, chemistry and mining engineering (including metallurgy), shipbuilding, architecture and civil engineering. These specialized sections representing the various departments of the Swedish Teknologföreningen reflected the educational structure of the Royal Institute of Technology. A supplement on Arkitektur och dekorativ konst (architecture and decorative arts, 1901-1922) developed into an independent journal Arkitektur. Teknisk Tidskrift's general edition was published once a week and the specialized editions once a month. In the autumn of 1967, the name of the weekly edition was changed to Ny Teknik which had a more popular scientific format.

In 1967, the publishing house Teknisk Tidskrifts förlag changed its name to Ingenjörsförlaget and in 1990 to E + T Förlag (Ekonomi & Teknik Förlag AB), after a merger with Affärsvärlden. In October 2005, E + T Förlag was sold to the Finnish Talentum Oy, publisher of the business magazine Talouselämä.
