= Sunt Förnuft =

Swedish business magazine

- Chief editor: Åke Jungdalen
- Former editors: Sten Nordin
- Categories: Finance magazine; Business magazine
- Frequency: 8 times per year
- Publisher: Skattebetalarnas förening
- Founded: 1921; 104 years ago
- Country: Sweden
- Based in: Stockholm
- Language: Swedish
- ISSN: 0039-5455
- OCLC: 17532258

Sunt Förnuft (Swedish: Common Sense) is a finance magazine published in Stockholm, Sweden, which is owned by the Swedish Taxpayers' Association. Founded in 1921, it is one of the oldest magazines in the country.

== History and profile ==
Sunt Förnuft was first published in 1921. The magazine is owned and published by the Swedish Taxpayers' Association. It is delivered to the members of the association. The headquarters of the magazine is in Stockholm. It is published eight times per year.

Sten Nordin, former mayor of Stockholm, served as the chief editor of Sunt Förnuft, which covers articles on taxes and economic development. As of 2015 Åke Jungdalen was the chief editor of the magazine.

In 2001 Sunt Förnuft had a circulation of 171,000 copies. In 2014 its circulation was 43,500 copies.

== See also ==
- List of magazines in Sweden
