= Land (magazine) =

Swedish magazine

- Editor-in-chief: Joel Linderoth
- Categories: Organizational pressure
- Frequency: 48 issues/year
- Paid circulation: 132,400
- First issue: 1971; 55 years ago
- Company: Federation of Swedish Farmers
- Country: Sweden
- Language: Swedish
- Website: land.se
- ISSN: 0023-7531 (print); 3035-7314 (web)

Land is a Swedish weekly family magazine with a countryside focus. The magazine was established in 1971. The headquarters of the magazine is in Stockholm. It is published by the Federation of Swedish Farmers (LRF) and is distributed to all members of LRF. Eva Källström is the editor-in-chief of Land.

In 2009 Land was one of the best-selling Swedish magazines with a circulation of 224,000 copies.
