= Arena (Swedish magazine) =

Online current affairs magazine in Sweden

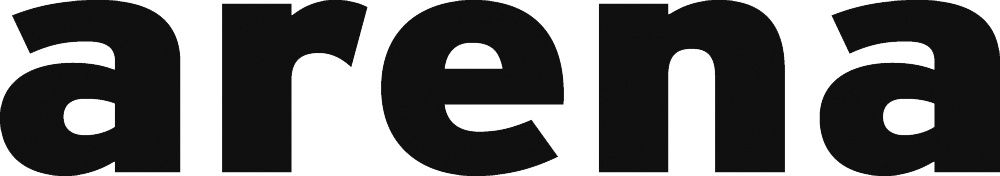

- Cover of issue 6, 2012 focusing on income inequality in Sweden
- Editor: Mikael Feldbaum and Malena Rydell
- Former editors: Per Wirtén, Karolina Ramqvist and Devrim Mavi
- Categories: Current affairs, politics and culture
- Circulation: 3,600
- Founder: Håkan A. Bengtsson and Per Wirtén
- First issue: 1993; 32 years ago
- Final issue: 2017 (print)
- Company: Arenagruppen
- Country: Sweden
- Based in: Stockholm
- Language: Swedish
- Website: www.magasinetarena.se
- ISSN: 1652-0556
- OCLC: 186005604

Arena is a Swedish-language bi-monthly left-leaning magazine. It publishes reports, interviews and essays on politics and culture. In 2017 the magazine went on online-only format.

== History and profile ==
Arena was founded by Håkan A. Bengtsson and Per Wirtén. It was first published in 1993 under the name Politikens, kulturens & idéernas arena. In 2003 the name was shortened to Arena. The magazine has a socialist political stance. Per Wirtén served as the editor-in-chief of the magazine. Another was Devrim Mavi, a politician. As of 2014 it was one of the four Swedish magazine members of the European magazine-network Eurozine.

Arena published six issues per year and had a circulation of approximately 3,600 copies in 2013.
