= Zionisten =

Zionist magazine in Sweden (1913)

- Editor: Leopold Turitz
- Categories: Political magazine
- Founder: Swedish Zionist Union
- Founded: 1913
- Final issue: October–November 1913
- Country: Sweden
- Based in: Stockholm
- Language: Swedish

Zionisten (Swedish: The Zionist) was a Zionist magazine which was based in Stockholm, Sweden. The founding organization was the Swedish Zionist Union, and the editor of the magazine was Leopold Turitz. The magazine advocated synthetic version of Zionism and aimed at offering a platform for those who could contribute to the ideas about Zionism in Sweden. Zionisten targeted both Zionists and non-Zionists in the country. It was designed as a monthly publication, but could produce only five issues in 1913 due to financial troubles. The last issue appeared in October–November 1913.
