= Hem Ljuva Hem Trädgård =

Swedish gardening magazine

Hem Ljuva Hem Trädgård (meaning Home Sweet Home Garden in English) is a magazine published in Sweden. The first issue of the magazine was published in April 2002. Its sister magazine is Hem Ljuva Hem. Both magazines are part of Plaza Publishing Group. The magazine covers articles about gardening and related topics. It is published four times a year. The headquarters is in Stockholm.
