= Federation of Swedish Farmers =

The Federation of Swedish Farmers (Lantbrukarnas Riksförbund, LRF) is an organisation for Swedish farmers. LRF has about 170 000 individual members, which represent about 90 000 agricultural enterprises, and the membership also includes most Swedish cooperatives in the agricultural and forestry sector.

LRF conducts business through seven subsidiaries, with 2 000 employees and a combined turnover of 2 billion Swedish krona:

- LRF Konsult, providing consultancy services for small- and medium-sized enterprises, including in accounting, tax and legal matters. LRF Konuslt has 1 300 employees in 125 locations in Sweden.
- Swedish Quality Seal, Sigill Kvalitetssystem, which is an environmental and product quality certification programme.
- LRF Samköp, a purchasing organisation for goods and services used by farmers and agricultural cooperatives.
- LRF Media, a publishing company for newspapers and magazines, also outside the agricultural area. Magazines published include:
  - Land, a weekly magazine distributed to all members of LRF.
  - ATL Lantbrukets Affärstidning, a news and business magazine for the agricultural sector.
- LRF Försäkring, an insurance company for farmers and the rural community.
- Sånga-Säby Kurs & Konferens, a conference centre located on Färingsö in Ekerö Municipality in the outskirts of Stockholm.

== History ==
LRF was created in 1971 by fusion of two organisations: Riksförbundet Landsbygdens folk (RLF), an organisation for farmers founded in 1929, and Sveriges Lantbruksförbund (SL), an organisation for agricultural production cooperatives founded in 1940, and which had a background in Sveriges Allmänna Lantbrukssällskap (SAL), founded in 1917.
