= Allt om Historia =

History magazine in Sweden

- Categories: History magazine
- Frequency: 14 times a year
- Publisher: Bonnier Publications
- Founded: 2005
- First issue: September 2005
- Company: Bonnier Group
- Country: Sweden
- Based in: Malmö
- Language: Swedish
- Website: Allt om Historia
- ISSN: 1653-3224
- OCLC: 185155075

Allt om Historia (Swedish: All about History) is a history magazine based in Malmö, Sweden. It has been in circulation since 2005.

== History and profile ==
Allt om Historia was established in 2005. The first issue was published in September 2005. Based in Malmö, the magazine covers articles and book reviews about historical events. It was based in Lund and was part of Historiska media until May 2010 when it was acquired by the LRF Media. On 1 June 2016 the magazine was sold to the Bonnier Group. It is published by the Bonnier Publications fourteen times a year.

Åke Persson served as the editor-in-chief of Allt om Historia. The magazine sold 22,000 copies in 2007 and 34,100 copies in 2010. The circulation of Allt om Historia was 26,700 copies in 2014.
