= Jordbruksaktuellt =

Swedish agricultural magazine

Jordbruksaktuellt, literally meaning Agriculture News, is an agricultural magazine published in Sweden. It is free and distributed to Swedish farmers and is published every other week with a circulation of just over 80 000. It is the largest magazine in its field and is published in 19 local editions. The headquarters is in Örebro.

== History ==
The magazine started in 1962 and is owned by Agriprim AB as a service to the agricultural industry. The first issue appeared on 6 October 1962 under the name Jordbrukarens Annonsblad. One year later it was renamed Jordbruksaktuellt. In 1997 the website of the magazine was launched.

The publishers also publishes the magazines Skogsaktuellt and Entreprenadaktuellt.
