= Chef (nickname) =

- "Chef", nickname of American Water Polo player Luis Araya
- "Chef", nickname of American basketball player Stephen Curry
- "Chef", nickname of American basketball player James Harden
- Chef John Paul Solis (born 1995), Filipino Chef, and Internet Personality
- Chef James (born 1988), Venezuelan chef, television personality, restaurateur, and author
- Chef Jolly, Indian Executive Chef at JW Marriott and celebrity chef
- Chef Pepín (born 1948), Spanish media personality and self-taught chef
- Chef Ra (1950–2006), American cannabis advocate and cannabis foods writer for High Times magazine
- Chef Tone (born 1983), American songwriter and record producer
- Chef Wan (born 1958), Singapore-born Malaysian celebrity chef
- The Chef, a pseudonym of songwriter Bilal Hajji, also known as Bilal "The Chef" Hajji
- The Chef, a pseudonym of the American rapper Raekwon of Wu-Tang Clan
