= Plaza Interiör =

Plaza Interiör is a Swedish monthly magazine about interior design, home decoration and design. It was established in 1995 and is published by Plaza Publishing Group AB, based in Stockholm, Sweden.

== History and profile ==
The magazine features articles on interior design, home decoration, furniture, kitchens, bathrooms and Swedish homes. Its coverage also includes shopping guides, design news, renovation ideas and reports from homes and design fairs.

During the 2000s, it was part of a growing Swedish market for interiors and home-design magazines. The magazine has also been distributed digitally.

In 2009, the magazine appointed a new editor-in-chief during a wider staff change at Plaza Publishing. In 2012, Louisa Nyström became editor-in-chief, succeeding Hanna Nova Beatrice.

Plaza Publishing Group later expanded its activity around homes and interiors through a 2013 investment in the housing portal Bovision.

== See also ==
List of magazines in Sweden
