= Hem i Sverige =

Swedish magazine (1908–1977)

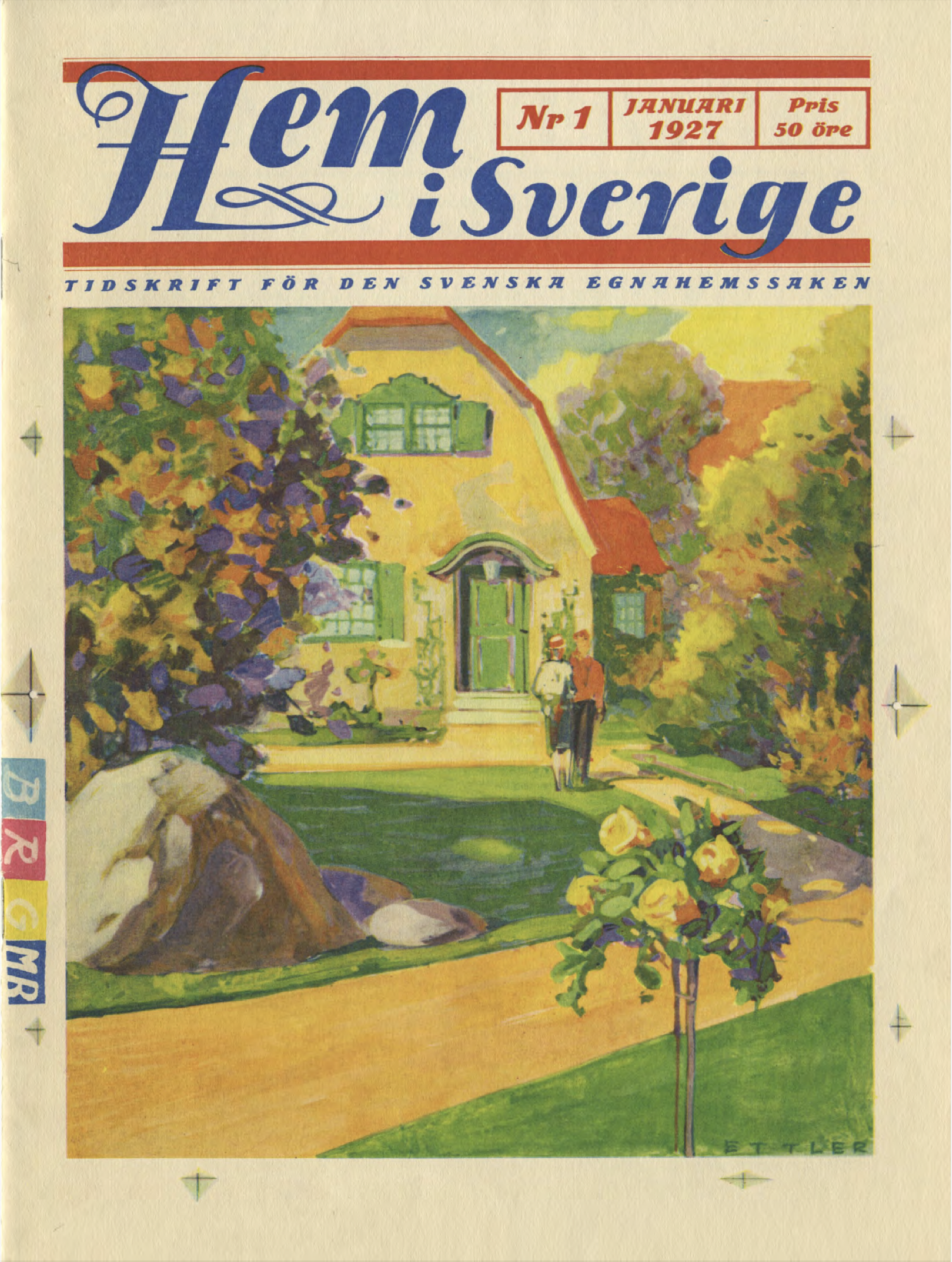
- January 1927 cover
- Founder: National Association against Emigration
- Founded: 1908
- Final issue: 1977
- Country: Sweden
- Based in: Stockholm
- Language: Swedish

Hem i Sverige (Swedish: Home in Sweden) was a magazine which existed in Stockholm, Sweden, between 1908 and 1977. The content of the magazine significantly varied throughout its long existence.

== History and profile ==
The magazine was launched by the National Association against Emigration in 1908 under the title Kvartalsblad utgifvet af Nationalföreningen mot emigrationen (Swedish: Quarterly magazine published by the National Association against migration). Its headquarters was in Stockholm. In the early period the magazine focused on the activities of the association and published the news about the policies on emigration to the country. Its editor was Adrian Molin, a far right politician and founder of the National Association against Emigration. It was mostly read by the members of the association and had a circulation of 5,000–6,000 copies until 1912. Its circulation rose to 17,000 copies in 1917.

In 1925 the National Association against Emigration was closed, and the magazine was redesigned. It began to appear under the title Hem i Sverige from 1926. Its focus became small farming activities and residential development in Sweden. Later it featured articles on crafts, but was not affiliated with the Swedish Arts and Crafts Society. Tyra Lundgren and Ulla Molin (daughter-in-law of Adrian Molin) were among its editors. The latter served in the post between 1942 and 1966.

The magazine was renamed as Villa & Hem i Sverige in 1964. Later its title was changed again, and it folded in 1977 under the title Bonytt.

All issues of the magazine from 1935 to 1941 and from 1946 to 1960 are archived at the Stockholm City Archives. Issues from 1956, 1958–1975 are archived at ArkDes in Stockholm.
