= Affärsvärlden =

Swedish business magazine

- Editor-in-chief: Max Jedeur Palmgren
- Categories: Business magazine
- Frequency: Weekly
- Publisher: AFV Media AB
- Founded: 1901; 125 years ago
- Country: Sweden
- Based in: Stockholm
- Language: Swedish
- Website: Affärsvärlden

Affärsvärlden (Swedish for "Business world") is a Swedish language weekly business magazine published in Stockholm, Sweden.

== History and profile ==
Affärsvärlden was founded in January 1901. Its former publisher was Ekonomi och Teknik Förlag AB. The magazine is published weekly. The magazine is based in Stockholm.

Affärsvärlden merged with another business magazine Finanstidningen in 1964. However, the merge was not a success in terms of circulation in that it could only achieve a circulation of four to five thousand copies. In 2002 Affärsvärlden acquired the editorial office of Ekonomi24, an internet-based economy news agency founded in 1999.

The target audience of the magazine is investors and decision-makers in large and medium-sized enterprises.

Emil Fitger served as the editor-in-chief of Affärsvärlden from 1914 to 1953. Max Jedeur Palmgren is the editor-in-chief of the magazine.

Affärsvärlden was named the most popular magazine in Sweden in 2022.

In 2004 the circulation of Affärsvärlden was 14,700 copies. The magazine sold 26,200 copies in 2008.

== See also ==
- List of magazines in Sweden
