= Skogsaktuellt =

Swedish agricultural magazine

Skogsaktuellt (Swedish: Forest News) is an agriculture and forestry magazine published in Örebro, Sweden. The magazine was first published in May 2007.

Skogsaktuellt is published on a monthly basis. It is the sister publication of Jordbruksaktuellt and Entreprenadaktuellt which are all part of Agriprim AB.
