= Hennes (magazine) =

Women's magazine in Sweden

- Categories: Women's magazine
- Founded: 1961
- Final issue: May 2009
- Company: Egmont Holding AB
- Country: Sweden
- Based in: Malmö
- Language: Swedish
- Website: https://tidningenhennes.se/

Hennes was a women's magazine published in Sweden. The magazine was in circulation between 1961 and 2009.

== History and profile ==
Hennes was established in 1961. The owner was Egmont Holding AB. The company acquired in 1997. It was headquartered in Malmö, and targeted young women. The last issue of Hennes appeared in May 2009.

== See also ==
- List of magazines in Sweden
