= Frida (magazine) =

Biweekly lifestyle magazine in Sweden (1981–2022)

- Editor: Beatrice Birkeldh
- Categories: Lifestyle magazine; Teen magazine
- Frequency: Biweekly
- Founder: Ove Jerselius
- Founded: 1981
- Final issue: 2022
- Company: FRIDA Förlag AB; Aller
- Country: Sweden
- Based in: Stockholm
- Language: Swedish
- Website: Frida

Frida was a biweekly teens' magazine published in Sweden. The magazine was in circulation between 1981 and 2022. Ove Jerselius was the founder of Frida which targeted teenaged girls. Its headquarters was in Stockholm.

== See also ==
- List of magazines in Sweden
