= Plaza Kvinna =

Swedish women's magazine

- Categories: Women's magazine
- Frequency: Monthly
- Publisher: Plaza Publishing Group
- Founded: 1994; 32 years ago
- Country: Sweden
- Based in: Stockholm
- Language: Swedish
- Website: https://plazakvinna.com/

Plaza Kvinna (meaning Plaza Woman in English) is a Swedish language monthly women's magazine published in Stockholm, Sweden.

== Profile ==
Plaza Kvinna was established in 1994. The publisher of the magazine is Plaza Publishing Group. The magazine targets professional women who are at the age of 20-45 and most likely live in a big city. Its headquarters is in Stockholm and it is published on a monthly basis.

In 1999, Plaza Kvinna sold 13,000 copies. Its circulation was 28,800 copies in 2013.

== See also ==
- List of magazines in Sweden
