= Ridsport =

Swedish magazine

Ridsport is a Swedish magazine about equestrianism and horse breeding. The magazine was founded in 1972 by Jan Bohlin, who is still the owner, and Ole Olson. The first issue appeared in November 1972. The Swedish Riding Sports Association is the publisher of the magazine. Three years later, the magazine changed to a tabloid format and became a biweekly publication. Currently, 24 issues are published each year, with additional special issues.

== Content ==
Ridsport focuses on news reporting on equestrianism, in particular equestrian sports, and horse breeding, in Sweden and abroad. Ridsport covers a wide range of topics related to equestrianism, including horse care, training techniques, competitive events, and rider profiles. The magazine caters to riders of all levels and disciplines, from recreational enthusiasts to competitive athletes.

It also publishes feature articles, interviews and opinion pieces. The magazine's editorial board is located in Trosa, and it also employs a number of free-lancing writers around Sweden.

The magazine also provides coverage of national and international equestrian events, including competitions, championships, and horse shows. Readers can find reports, interviews, and analysis of these events, keeping them informed about the latest developments in the equestrian world.

Within its pages, readers can find articles featuring tips and advice on improving riding skills, insights into the latest trends and developments in the equestrian world, and interviews with notable riders, trainers, and industry experts. RideSport also provides coverage of national and international equestrian competitions, keeping readers up-to-date on results, highlights, and upcoming events.

== Comet of the Year Award ==
The magazine awards the . Over the decades, Ridsport has remained a staple publication for horse enthusiasts in Sweden, offering a mix of informative content, entertaining features, and insightful commentary. It continues to serve as a valuable resource for riders, providing them with inspiration, education, and a sense of community within the equestrian world.
