= Wheels Magazine (Sweden) =

Swedish automotive magazine

Wheels Magazine is a Swedish automobile magazine published in Stockholm, Sweden.

== History and profile ==
Wheels Magazine was founded in 1977. The magazine is published by Egmont Tidskrifter AB in Stockholm. It mostly deals with hot rods and custom cars.

In 2014 the circulation of Wheels Magazine was 15,400 copies.
