= Aktiespararen =

Business magazine in Sweden

- Categories: Business magazine
- Frequency: Monthly
- Founder: Swedish Shareholders' Association
- Founded: 1967; 59 years ago
- Country: Sweden
- Based in: Stockholm
- Language: Swedish
- Website: Aktiespararen
- ISSN: 0345-049X
- OCLC: 495948331

Aktiespararen (Swedish: The Shareholder) is a monthly business magazine based in Stockholm, Sweden. It is the official organ of the Swedish Shareholders' Association and has been in circulation since 1967.

== History and profile ==
Aktiespararen was established in 1967. The magazine is owned by the Swedish Shareholders' Association. Based in Stockholm, it is published on a monthly basis. It offers articles concerning the Swedish market for companies' shares publicly listed, mutual funds and other securities. The magazine publishes financial analyses about Swedish companies.
