= Chef (magazine) =

Monthly business magazine in Sweden

- Editor-in-chief: Cissi Elwin Frenkel
- Categories: Business magazine; Management magazine
- Frequency: Monthly
- Publisher: Chef Stockholm AB
- Founded: 1995; 30 years ago
- Company: Ledarna
- Country: Sweden
- Based in: Stockholm
- Language: Swedish
- Website: Chef

Chef (Swedish for 'Manager') is a monthly management and business magazine published in Stockholm, Sweden. It has been in circulation since 1995.

== History and profile ==
Chef was established in 1995. The magazine is part of Ledarna and is published by Chef Stockholm AB on a monthly basis. Since 2011 Cissi Elwin Frenkel has been the editor-in-chief of the magazine of which target audience is company managers. The magazine has its headquarters in Stockholm.

Chef was named by the Swedish Magazine Publishers Association as the business magazine of the year in 1997. It was the best digital magazine in 2013 and in 2018 in Sweden. Its website was one of Sweden’s 100 best websites in March 2017.

Chef was the best-selling business magazine in Sweden with a circulation of 111,000 copies in 2009. The magazine had a circulation of 111,600 copies in 2010 and 110,300 copies in 2011. Its circulation was 107,200 copies in 2012. It rose to 112,600 copies in 2014.

== See also ==
- List of magazines in Sweden
