= Frisinnad Tidskrift =

Swedish political magazine

- Former editors: Waldemar Svensson
- Categories: Political magazine
- Publisher: Föreningen Frisinnad Tidskrift
- Founder: Waldemar Svensson
- Founded: 1930
- Country: Sweden
- Based in: Västerås
- Language: Swedish
- Website: Frisinnad Tidskrift
- ISSN: 0345-3723
- OCLC: 924804454

Frisinnad Tidskrift is a political magazine which has been in circulation since 1930 in Västerås, Sweden. The magazine is not affiliated with any political party, but many of its readers and people on its board are, or have been, affiliated with the Liberal People's Party.

== History and profile ==
Frisinnad Tidskrift was launched in 1930 to spread the messages of the Liberal People's Party. The founder was Waldemar Svensson who also edited the magazine for a long time. Erik Hjalmar Linder and Gunnar Edman were among the contributors during the 1940s and 1950s, and the magazine was published on a bimonthly basis in this period. The publisher of the magazine is Föreningen Frisinnad Tidskrift.

Frisinnad Tidskrift was first published in Ljungskile, but in the period 1959–1982 it was based in Stockholm.
