= Häst&Ryttare =

Equine magazine in Sweden

- Categories: Equine magazine
- Frequency: Five times per year
- Publisher: Svenska Ridsportförbundet
- Founded: 2005
- First issue: June 2005
- Country: Sweden
- Based in: Strömsholm
- Language: Swedish
- Website: www.tipsbladet.dk

Häst&Ryttare (Swedish: Horse and Rider) is an equine magazine based in Strömsholm, Sweden. The magazine is the official media outlet of Swedish Equestrian Association.

== History and profile ==
Häst&Ryttare was established in 2005. The first issue was published in June 2005. It is the official organ of Swedish Equestrian Association and is sent to the members of the Association. The magazine is published by Svenska Ridsportförbundet five times a year. Its headquarters is in Strömsholm.

Sveriges Uppdragspublicister (Swedish Association of Custom Publishers) awarded Häst&Ryttare twice; in 2005 as the best newcomer of the year and in 2006 as the best member and organization journal.

From 1 September to 31 December 2014 Häst&Ryttare had 95,000 readers. That year the circulation of the magazine was 114,200 copies. In 2015 its circulation increased to 122,300 copies.
