= Clarté (magazine) =

Annual political magazine in Sweden

- Categories: Political magazine
- Frequency: Annual
- Founded: 1924
- Company: Swedish Clarté League
- Country: Sweden
- Based in: Stockholm
- Language: Swedish
- ISSN: 0345-2085
- OCLC: 470213787

Clarté (Swedish: Clarity) is a leftist magazine which has been in circulation in Stockholm, Sweden, since 1921 with some interruptions. It is the official media out of the Swedish Clarté League, a non-partisan socialist students' organization. The subtitle of the magazine is Tidskrift för socialistisk kultur (Swedish: Journal of socialist culture).

== History and profile ==
Clarté was established by the Swedish Clarté Federation in 1924. The goal was to critically examine the social ideas, and social institutions. It was first headquartered in Lund and was moved to Stockholm in 1928. The magazine was temporarily closed down between 1941 and 1944. Clarté was published in Hägersten between 1991 and 1995 and was based in Stockholm from 1995 to 2013. It has been headquartered in Bagarmossen, a district of Stockholm, since 2013.

Clarté is a 68-page annual publication, and its circulation is about 1,100 copies.

Clarté became a Maoist periodical from February 1967 when the Maoists assumed the leadership of Swedish Clarté Federation and therefore, was one of the Swedish media outlets which contributed to the introduction of Maoism. Shortly after this incident the magazine produced a special issue on the Chinese cultural revolution. During this period argued "[Zionism] was a bourgeois-capitalist reaction against antisemitism, that means it neither can nor wanted to abolish antisemitism to achieve its goal – a capitalist society in Palestine in which Jews constituted the majority." However, its political stance changed over time.

Tomas Gerholm was one of the editors-in-chief of Clarté.
