= Entreprenadaktuellt =

Swedish contractor magazine

Entreprenadaktuellt, literally translated as Contractor News, is a magazine published in Örebro, Sweden. It is free and distributed to all Swedish contractor and garden companies and is published every month.

== History and profile ==
Entreprenadaktuellt was first published in February 2008. The magazine is owned by Agriprim AB as a service to the contractor and gardening industry.

The publishers also publishes the magazines Skogsaktuellt and Jordbruksaktuellt.
