= Arbetarhistoria =

- Cover of issue 140 (2011:4), which featured texts on women in the communism movement
- Editor: Silke Neunsinger
- Categories: Labour history
- Frequency: Quarterly
- Publisher: Swedish Labour Movement Archives and Library
- Founded: 1977
- Country: Sweden
- Based in: Huddinge, Stockholm
- Language: Swedish, Danish, Norwegian
- Website: www.arbetarhistoria.se
- ISSN: 0281-7446
- OCLC: 471534439

Arbetarhistoria is a quarterly magazine on labour history published by the Swedish Labour Movement Archives and Library (Swedish: Arbetarrörelsens arkiv och bibliotek). It was established in 1977 as Meddelande från Arbetarrörelsens arkiv och bibliotek and obtained its current name in 1984. It is targeted both at academics and the interested public. It is based in Huddinge.

Each issue usually contains articles about the labour movement and working life history centred on a theme, such as "working conditions", "political protest", "Olof Palme and his time", "the Spanish Civil War", "women in the communism movement" or "Swedish working class literature in an international perspective" as well as reports on ongoing research, reviews on new works in the discipline, and introductions to source material from the collections at the Labour Movement Archives and Library.
