= Det Nya Sverige =

Political magazine in Sweden (1907–1928)

- Editor: Gustaf Olsson
- Former editors: Adrian Molin
- Categories: Political magazine
- Frequency: Monthly
- Founder: Adrian Molin
- Founded: 1907
- Final issue: 1928
- Country: Sweden
- Based in: Stockholm; Lund
- Language: Swedish

Det Nya Sverige (Swedish: The New Sweden) was a conservative political magazine published in Stockholm, Sweden, between 1907 and 1928. Its subtitle was tidskrift för nationella spörsmål (Swedish: A Journal of National Questions).

== History and profile ==
Det Nya Sverige was launched as an organ of the radical conservative movement, Unghöger (Swedish: The Young Right), in 1907. Its founder was Adrian Molin who also edited the magazine until 1926 when Gustaf Olsson replaced him in the post.

In the second year of publication Molin argued in his column that Det Nya Sverige was not a mainstream magazine. He maintained that it addressed those who had an interest in public affairs independent of their social class and political party focusing on all questions concerning the Swedish cultivation and spiritual topics. The magazine was published by different publishing houses during its existence. It had a conservative political stance and came out monthly. The magazine was first headquartered in Stockholm and moved in 1926 to Lund where it was published until its demise in 1928.
