= ATL Lantbrukets Affärstidning =

Swedish farming magazine

ATL Lantbrukets Affärstidning is a Swedish nationwide trade magazine for farmers. The magazine features articles on agricultural market and business issues. It is owned by the LRF Media and was founded 1884. Publisher is Annika R Hermanrud and editor i chief is Lilian Almroth. The editorial office is located in Stockholm.

In 2010 the circulation of ATL Lantbrukets Affärstidning was 51,700 copies.
