= Åkeri & Entreprenad =

Swedish business magazine

- Categories: Business magazine
- Founded: 2000
- Company: Svenska Media Docu AB
- Country: Sweden
- Based in: Ljusdal
- Language: Swedish
- Website: Åkeri & Entreprenad
- OCLC: 222152942

Åkeri & Entreprenad is a Swedish language business magazine based in Ljusdal, Sweden. It features articles concerning transportation industry in the country.

== History and profile ==
Åkeri & Entreprenad was established in 2000. The magazine is owned and published by Svenska Media Docu AB. The headquarters is in Ljusdal.

The target audience of the magazine include decision-makers in freight companies, civil engineering contractors, forestry contractors and rental companies. The magazine sold 71,900 copies in 2014 and 74,500 copies in 2015.
