= OBS! (magazine) =

Biweekly business and cultural magazine in Sweden (1944–1955)

- Categories: Business magazine; Cultural magazine; Political magazine
- Frequency: Monthly
- Founded: 1944
- First issue: April 1944
- Final issue: 1955
- Country: Sweden
- Based in: Stockholm
- Language: Swedish

OBS! was a biweekly conservative business and cultural magazine which also contained a significant political content. The magazine existed between 1944 and 1955 and was headquartered in Stockholm, Sweden.

== History and profile ==
OBS! was established by a group of Swedish journalists, including Arvid Fredborg, Th Åke Leissner and Gunnar Unger, in 1944 with the financial assistance of the International Freedom Academy based in Vienna. Its first issue appeared in April that year. The magazine was published on a biweekly basis, and its stated aim was to promote a sound economy and free enterprise. Arvid Fredborg was its founding editor. The first editorial was written by Gunnar Unger who became the editor of the magazine in 1949. The other founder, Th Åke Leissner, also published articles in OBS! under a pseudonym. Ove Dahlstrand was among the illustrators of the magazine.

The covers of the magazine contained caricatures of the leading politicians, movie stars and other well-known personalities. The magazine featured economy-oriented articles, but its political content was much more prominent. The editor of OBS!, Gunnar Unger, described the magazine as an "avantgarde organ in the anti-socialist propaganda." The magazine frequently criticised the social democrat policies and supported the development of the Swedish industry.

Following the first year OBS! sold 20,000-25,000 copies. The financial assistance of the International Freedom Academy continued until 1953. Then, the magazine was financed by businessmen until its demise in 1955.

OBS! has inspired various conservative magazines one of which is Contra.
