= Veckans Vimmel =

Weekly magazine published in Sweden

Veckans Vimmel was a weekly magazine published in Stockholm, Sweden, between 2003 and 2005. It was a celebrity-oriented publication until 2004, when it was restarted as a girls' magazine. Elin Liljero served as the editor-in-chief of the magazine.
