= Salt (Swedish magazine) =

Political magazine in Sweden (1999–2002)

- Editor-in-chief: Per-Olof Bolander; Jonas De Geer; Åsa Ljungquist
- Categories: Political magazine
- Frequency: Three or four times per year
- Founded: 1999
- First issue: October 1999
- Final issue: 2002
- Country: Sweden
- Based in: Stockholm; Gothenburg
- Language: Swedish
- ISSN: 1404-6938
- OCLC: 185386199

Salt was a conservative political magazine which appeared from 1999 to 2002 in Sweden. It was closed due to the condemnation of its antisemitic and anti-immigrant leaning. The magazine is cited as an example of anti-semitism in the conservative ideology.

== History and profile ==
Salt was launched in 1999 and billed itself as an extremely conservative publication. The first issue appeared in October 1999 in which Jonas De Geer and Per-Olof Bolander described the magazine as follows: "It will not be like other publications and will not support the dominant left-liberal propaganda in Sweden. Instead, it will criticize the dominant ideologies of today, feminism and multiculturalism. We are cultural conservatives and defend traditional Swedish and Western values." Salt came out three or four times a year. From its start in 1999 to 2001 the magazine was headquartered in Stockholm. Then its editorial office was moved to Gothenburg.

Jonas De Geer and Per-Olof Bolander coedited the magazine in 1999 and between 2001 and 2002. Jonas De Geer, Per-Olof Bolander and Åsa Ljungquist were the editors-in-chief for the issues 3–5 which were published in 2000. The sixth issue dated 2000 was edited by Jonas De Geer. Its contributors were conservative Swedish intellectuals and academics. The magazine published articles which opposed the Holocaust and the migration to Sweden. These articles caused discussions about whether or not the magazine was a racist publication. As a result, common negative reactions occurred in the Swedish mass media which led to the closure of Salt in 2002.
