= Nya Affärer =

Business magazine in Sweden (2010–2015)

- Categories: Business magazine
- Publisher: Bonnier Tidskrifter
- Founded: 2010
- First issue: October 2010
- Final issue: 2015
- Company: Bonnier Media Group
- Country: Sweden
- Based in: Stockholm
- Language: Swedish

Nya Affärer (Swedish: New Business) was a business magazine in Sweden, which was established and published by Bonnier Tidskrifter from 2010 to 2015. The magazine was merged with two magazines, Veckans Affärer and Privata Affärer, in 2015. The former also ended publication, in December 2019, and the website of Nya Affärer directs to Privata Affärer.

== History and profile ==
Nya Affärer was first published in October 2010. The magazine was part of Bonnier Media Group and was published by Bonnier Tidskrifter. Its target audience was entrepreneurs. The magazine awarded entrepreneurs in four categories: entrepreneur of the year, new entrepreneurs, inspiring entrepreneurs and venture capitalists. Nya Affärer ceased publication and was merged into Veckans Affärer and Privata Affärer in late 2015.
