= The Chef (novel) =

2019 novel by James Patterson and Max DiLallo

- First edition
- Author: James Patterson and Max DiLallo
- Language: English
- Genre: Thriller
- Publisher: Little, Brown & Company
- Publication date: Feb. 18, 2019
- Publication place: United States
- Media type: Print (hardcover)
- Pages: 400 pp (first edition, hardcover)
- ISBN: 978-0316453301

The Chef is a stand-alone thriller novel by James Patterson and Max DiLallo.

== Plot ==
Caleb Rooney is a major crimes detective with the New Orleans Police Department. On the side he and his ex-wife run a well known and highly acclaimed food truck, named Killer Chef. Rooney has just been raked over the coals for an incident in which he fired his weapon and killed a known gang member. He quits the police department in disgust, devoting all his time to his food sideline. Rooney cannot escape his past with the police by leaving the department, however. He is hounded by those who were members of the gang of the man he had killed. Rooney stumbled upon a possible terror plot to take place during Mardi Gras. He has stepped on toes of others in the culinary industry in town. And his independent investigation of the terror plot has gotten him into difficulties with the local FBI leader, who is also investigating it.

== Multimedia supplementary material ==
The novel was supported by multimedia supplementary material available primarily through the Facebook Messenger app, which has been described by literary scholars as "innovative".

== Reviews ==
A review in Bloomberg News asked two New Orleans food experts what they thought of this book. They said it did not depict how their city really is and it did not depict how difficult it is to prepare and cook food. One of the experts said one of the clichés with which Patterson opened the book reminded him of a skit, "There’s a recent Saturday Night Live skit that plays up the . . . clichés. It gives you a perfect perspective of how you should read this book—like an SNL skit." A review in book reporter was much more positive, saying, "It is an impressive tale that is complete in itself but leaves the possibility open for more stories of the Killer Chef."

This book made its high point on the "Combined Print & E-Book Fiction" section of "The New York Times Best Sellers" list for March 10, 2019, when it was number two.
