= Journalisten =

Member magazine in Sweden

- Categories: Media news magazine
- Founded: 1904
- First issue: March 1904
- Country: Sweden
- Based in: Stockholm
- Language: Swedish
- Website: www.journalisten.se
- ISSN: 0022-5592
- OCLC: 1023286010

Journalisten is a member magazine of the Swedish Union of Journalists which has been in circulation since 1904. It is headquartered in Stockholm, Sweden.

== History and profile ==
The magazine was first published in March 1904 and was printed five times per year until 1920s when it became a monthly publication. The Swedish Union of Journalists is the owner and publisher of the magazine. Its founding editor-in-chief was John Törnequist. It was renamed Journalisten in 1950. During the 1960s and 1970s the magazine only featured news with no extensive comments. In 1980 Karin Alfredsson was named as the editor-in-chief of the magazine, of which frequency was changed from 12 issues to 39 issues per year.

Its website was launched in 1997. In Autumn 2008 Journalisten was published fifteen times per year. As of 2020, it was published ten times per year.
