= Hem Ljuva Hem =

Swedish lifestyle magazine

Hem Ljuva Hem ("Home Sweet Home") is a lifestyle magazine published in Stockholm, Sweden.

== History and profile ==
Hem Ljuva Hem was started in 1999. The magazine is part of the Plaza Publishing Group. The publisher is Station 5 AB, a subsidiary of the group. The magazine is headquartered in Stockholm and covers articles on practical tips about home decoration.

In 2014 the circulation of Hem Ljuva Hem was 34,500 copies.

== See also ==
- List of magazines in Sweden
