= Biotech Sweden =

Swedish magazine

- Categories: Scandinavian life science and biotech industry
- First issue: 9 April 2002
- Final issue: 2012
- Company: IDG
- Country: Sweden

Biotech Sweden was a Swedish tabloid magazine about and for the Scandinavian life science and biotech industry.

== History and profile ==
Biotech Sweden was first published on 9 April 2002 by IDG Sweden, a subsidiary of IDG. It was sister publication of Bio-IT World. At its initial phase Biotech Sweden was published seven times a year. Then it began to be published 11 times per year. The readers were mainly people working in the biotechnology medtech and pharma industry of the Nordic countries. It also carried the largest life science web news service of the Nordic countries, www.lifesciencesweden.se, with four newsletter distributed three times a week, subscription free-of-charge. On the website the magazine provided daily news in Swedish and a weekly news-letter covering life science news of the Nordic countries, plus also access to The Scandinavian Life Science Industry Guide, a database of all life science, medtech and labtech companies of Scandinavia. Life Science Sweden is also official media partner of Sweden Bio.

The editor-in-chiefs included Ingrid Heath, Jörgen Lindqvist, Ingrid Helander and Loth Hammar.

In 2012, the magazine changed its name to Life Science Sweden and in 2013 it was sold to Mentor Communications AB.
