= Solo (magazine) =

Monthly women's magazine in Sweden(1997–2016)

Solo was a Swedish language monthly women's magazine published in Stockholm, Sweden. The magazine was in circulation between 1997 and 2016.

== History and profile ==
Solo was founded in 1997. The magazine targeted young women between 18 and 35 years old. It was part of Aller media. Karin Nordin was the editor-in-chief of the magazine which was published on a monthly basis. Its headquarters was in Stockholm. In Spring 2016 the frequency of the magazine was made bimonthly. In Fall of the same year the magazine folded.
