= OmVärlden =

Swedish online political magazine

- Categories: Global development
- Frequency: Online political magazine
- Publisher: Global Reporting
- Founded: 1970
- Final issue: December 2014 (print)
- Country: Sweden
- Based in: Stockholm
- Language: Swedish
- Website: OmVärlden
- OCLC: 856515552

OmVärlden (Swedish: Around the World) is an online magazine based in Stockholm, Sweden, which focuses on global affairs and international politics. The magazine had a print edition until December 2014 when it went on online-only format. OmVärlden is financed by Sida, the Swedish Development Cooperation Agency, but fully independent with the editor-in-chief responsible under Swedish press laws.

== History and profile ==
The magazine was established in 1970 under the name Rapport från Sida (Swedish: Report from Sida). Its goal was to provide information about development cooperation and its effects on different societies. The magazine was renamed as SIDA Rapport (Swedish: Sida Report) in 1985, and its mission was reported to provide a forum for free debate.

In 1994 its title was changed as OmVärlden. The Swedish International Development Cooperation Agency (Sida) was the owner of the magazine. The former publishers of the magazine were Global Reporting and Arenagruppen. Previously Erik Halkjaer, Anki Wood, Jesper Bengtsson served as the editor-in-chief of the magazine. Bengtsson was appointed to the post in 2010. Ylva Johnson and Jöran Hök also served as editors-in-chief. Swedish journalist Karin Alfredsson is among the former contributors. The magazine covers articles concerning global affairs and global development.

In November 2014 Sida announced that OmVärlden would go on online, and from December 2014 the magazine continued in this format. Intellecta Corporate took over OmVärlden in January 2015. Erik Halkjaer was named the editor-in-chief of the magazine in 2015. In January 2016 Global Reporting once again took over the publishing of OmVärlden with Ylva Bergman as editor-in-chief between 2016 and 2020 and developed the journalism online with several noteworthy investigative reports, constructive journalism and multi-dimensional perspectives that increased its reach by 180%.
