= Populär Historia =

Monthly history magazine in Sweden

- Categories: History magazine
- Frequency: Monthly
- Publisher: Bonnier Publications
- Founded: 1991
- Company: Bonnier Group
- Country: Sweden
- Based in: Malmö
- Language: Swedish
- Website: Populär Historia
- ISSN: 1102-0822
- OCLC: 1322199575

Populär Historia (Swedish: Popular History) is a monthly history magazine published in Malmö, Sweden. The magazine, which has been in circulation since 1991, is the first history-oriented periodical in the country.

== History and profile ==
Populär Historia was started in 1991. The founding company was Historiska Media. The LRF Media acquired the magazine in May 2010 and owned it until 1 June 2016 when it was sold to the Bonnier Group.

The magazine is based in Malmö. Since 2016, the magazine has been published by Bonnier Publications on a monthly basis. As of 2016, Jacob Wiberg was the editor-in-chief of the magazine.

Populär Historia was the recipient of the Swedish Magazine Publishers Association's grand prize in 2004.

In 2007, the majority of Populär Historia readers were men. The circulation of the magazine was 22,300 copies in 2000. The magazine sold 35,000 copies in 2009.
