= List of trade magazines =

This is an incomplete list of trade magazines (or trade journals) which are notable.

== Advertising ==
- Advertising Age
- Ad Week

== Aerospace industry ==
- Aviation Week & Space Technology
- SpaceNews

== Amusement industry ==
- Amusement Today
- Funworld Magazine

== Arts and cultural industries ==
- TradeArt

== Automotive industry ==
- Kraftfahrzeugtechnik
- Automotive Industries

== Beauty industry ==
- American Salon

== Construction industry ==
- Cranes Today
- kbbreview

== Consumer electronics ==
- Popular Mechanics
- Twice

== Education ==
- Tes (previously Times Educational Supplement)

== Electronics ==
- EDN
- EE Times
- Electronic News

== Fashion industry ==
- The Business of Fashion
- Women's Wear Daily

== Film industry ==
- American Cinematographer
- BackStage
- Boxoffice Magazine
- CinemaEditor
- Cineuropa
- Creative COW
- Deadline Hollywood
- Film International
- Filmmaker
- fps magazine
- Film Comment
- Film Daily
- Film Quarterly
- Harrison's Reports
- The Hollywood Reporter
- indieWire
- MovieMaker
- Playback
- Variety

== Financial services industry ==
- Citywire
- Financial Adviser
- Investment Adviser
- Investment Week
- Money Management
- Money Marketing
- Professional Pensions

== Food and agriculture ==
- ATL Lantbrukets Affärstidning
- Australian Dairy Foods
- Better Farming (Canada)
- Curry Life
- Eurofruit
- Farmers Guide
- Farmers Weekly
- Food Engineering
- Harpers Wine & Spirit
- Jordbruksaktuellt
- Restaurant Magazine

== Gaming industry ==
- Coinslot
- Game Industry Report Magazine

== Health and medicine ==
- Becker's Hospital Review
- Chiropractic Economics
- Dynamic Chiropractic
- EMS World
- MD&DI
- Medical World News
- Midwives (magazine)
- The Modern Hospital
- Nursing in Practice
- Psychiatric Times
- Safety and Health
- U.S. Pharmacist

== Law ==
- Law Practice Magazine
- Legal Week

== Manufacturing trades ==
- Pulp and Paper
- Surplus Record Machinery & Equipment Directory

== Marketing ==
- DigiDay
- Marketing Week
- The Drum

== Media ==
- Campaign
- MediaWeek
- New Media Age
- Revolution

== Mining ==
- Boletín Minero
- The Mining Journal
- Mining Weekly
- The Northern Miner

== Music industry ==
- Billboard
- CashBox Magazine
- Music Connection
- Music Week
- The Music Trade Review
- Radio & Records

== Packaging ==
- Packaging Digest
- Packaging Machinery Technology
- Packaging World

== Publishing and book trade ==
- Booklist
- The Bookseller
- The Hard Copy Observer
- Library Journal
- Publishers Weekly
- School Library Journal

== Recreation ==
- Outdoor USA Magazine

== Retailing ==
- Private Label

== Technical trades ==
- BioTechniques
- Chemical & Engineering News
- Genetic Engineering News
- Imaging Technology News
- Scientific Computing & Instrumentation

== Transportation ==
- International Railway Journal

== U.S. Politics ==
- Congressional Quarterly
- The Hill (newspaper)
- National Journal
- Roll Call

== See also ==
- List of academic journals
- Reed Business Information, containing a partial list of business and trade magazines from this publisher
- Category:Professional and trade magazines
