= The Legal Intelligencer =

- Type: Daily legal newspaper
- Owner: ALM
- Founder: Henry E. Wallace
- Editor: Hank Grezlak
- Founded: December 12, 1843
- Language: English
- Headquarters: Philadelphia
- ISSN: 0277-495X
- Website: www.thelegalintelligencer.com

The Legal Intelligencer is the oldest daily law journal published in the United States, and serves the legal community of Philadelphia and surrounding areas. The paper was founded in 1843 by Philadelphia attorney Henry E. Wallace.

The newspaper is published Monday through Friday, and covers legal news, decisions, court calendars, and legislation, and provides analysis and insight in columns written by leading professionals. It is also the newspaper of record for legal notice filings, such as sheriff's sales and incorporation notices, in Philadelphia County. The newspaper publishes a number of special issues, including its "PaLaw 100" rankings of Pennsylvania's 100 largest law firms.

== History ==
=== Founding ===
In 1843, Philadelphia lawyer Henry E. Wallace had a goal of providing his fellow practitioners with current information on judicial and legal activities, and especially news of the auditors' meetings through which much of the routine of the law was then conducted.

On Saturday, Dec. 12, 1843, to be exact, Wallace launched the first issue of The Legal Intelligencer. "Intended as a medium for all legal notices," as the introduction for the first issue stated, the newspaper was designed "to remove an inconvenience which from the want of such a paper, has long been felt by the bar and suitors."

The principles behind Wallace's publication still stand – to provide the legal community and other interested parties with current information on judicial and legal activities that can't be found in any other medium. Although the nature of law and publishing has changed, and The Legal Intelligencer has changed with it, the commitment of the paper to the bar is as strong as ever.

Henry E. Wallace, James H. Robbins, Edward P. Allinson and Walter E. Rauffenbart are just a few of the names of those who have guided The Legal from its first office at 117 Race Street to its current address at 1617 JFK Blvd., Suite 1750, Philadelphia, Pa. 19103. Henry Wallace was admitted to the bar in 1836, he had an active practice, but still found time to establish the Pennsylvania Law Journal in 1842.

Responding to a proclamation on Nov. 25, 1843, by the District Court for the City and County of Philadelphia that "it had been represented by the court by the petitioned of many members and the bar of this court that it would be more convenient and would give more certain notices to them of the proceedings before auditors appointed to distribute the proceeds of sales upon the process of this court if notices were given in The Legal Intelligencer." Wallace established a weekly publication schedule on Saturday evening for the newspaper.

The District Court directed that whenever an auditor proceeding occurs then "advertisement be made twice successively in The Legal Intelligencer published in Philadelphia and also for 10 successive days in one paper in the city of Philadelphia." Similar rules were promptly adopted by the Orphans' Court and the Court of Common Pleas. Besides these notices, Wallace undertook to give an abstract of the real estate to be sold by the sheriff. In those days, sheriff's sales were held at intervals of approximately two weeks at the Philadelphia Exchange, usually between 6:30 and 8 p.m.

Publication of the paper remained in Wallace's hands for about three years, although the publication date changed from Thursdays to Wednesdays and then permanently (for 85 years) to Friday evenings. It then changed to the control of James H. Robbins. In 1845 the name of David Webster appeared as co-publisher with Wallace. A year later, Robbins replaced Webster as co-publisher. Over the next five years, the newspaper's office changed from Race Street to 66 S. 6th Street to 125 Walnut Street and then to 9 Sansom Street. Ownership of the paper changed hands again to King and Baird.

It is unclear how Robbins' connection with the paper was severed, but in the spring of 1855 Wallace's name reappeared as editor and he continued to edit the paper he had founded until February 23, 1879, when he died. At this time, Dallas Sanders and Henry C. Titus continued to co-edit the paper.

As changes in ownership and editorial occurred, so did the breadth of coverage provided by the journal. Register of wills listings, trial listings, texts of bills introduced in the state Legislature, state court argument lists and lists of new lawyers passing the bar exam were published. One of the most important features of the paper, the reporting of full-text opinions and condensed digests of important decisions also began. These are all prominent features of the paper today.

In 1861, The Legal Intelligencer, as designated by William H. Seward, secretary of state under Abraham Lincoln, printed orders and resolutions enacted during the first session of the 37th Congress. Edward P. Allinson of the law firm Page Allinson & Penrose became publisher in 1891, and a year later James C. Monaghan, a former state reporter for the Supreme Court of Pennsylvania, joined the staff.

=== 20th century ===
On February 1, 1901, Howard W. Page, son of S. Davis Page Jr., Allinson's law partner, took over publication of the paper and became general and state editor. On April 10, 1903, the latter post was assumed by Martin V. Bergen. He continued to function in that capacity until 1917, when he was succeeded by Meredith Hanna, who later became deputy prothonotary of the Courts of Common Pleas of Philadelphia County.

In 1922, Hanna was succeeded in turn by Albert B. Weimer, who, like James Monaghan was an official state reporter. On February 6, 1925, Albert Branson Maris, later a federal judge, became Philadelphia editor.

By 1926, the publication office was removed to the Land Title Building. Howard Page died on March 15, 1933, and the members of the Page family, on whose behalf he had carried on the business, organized a Pennsylvania corporation under the Title of The Legal Intelligencer.

Maris was elected president and Joseph N. Rauffenbart, who had been connected with the business for nearly 10 years, became treasurer.

In 1933 a major change took place and The Legal Intelligencer became a daily paper, the start of the modern era of the newspaper. On September 5, the weekly publication was superseded by daily publication.

In 1936, Maris resigned all connections with the paper when he was appointed to the federal judiciary. The newspaper changed its address to 222 N. 15th Street where its business and editorial offices and all of its printing facilities were brought under one roof.

Editors came and went over the next 40 years, but one name remained constant – Walter E. Rauffenbart. He joined the paper when his father was treasurer and general manager and Maris was still president.

Under Rauffenbart's direction, the paper's business expanded into other areas of legal publishing, including court rules and a wider coverage of court opinions for publication in the statewide District and County Reports, a publication The Legal Intelligencer began producing in 1892.

Rauffenbart also worked closely with the Philadelphia Bar Association, and helped originate the Shingle in 1937, a magazine now known as The Philadelphia Lawyer . Rauffenbart retired from active management of the newspaper in 1977 and died in 1998.

Another name synonymous with the Legal for 45 years was that of Ida M. Hess, who joined the paper in 1933 as a secretary and worked her way up to becoming managing editor of the paper, a position she held for 20 years. She retired in 1987, but continued to consult with the paper until her death.

Packard Press, then known as Philadelphia Printing Properties Inc. acquired The Legal Intelligencer and its affiliated publications in the early 1970s, when Phillip J. Kendall became publisher and offices were maintained at 66 N. Juniper Street until moved to a larger facility in the early 1980s to 10th and Spring Garden streets.

By this time, The Legal Intelligencer was not just a newspaper, but part of the publishing division of Packard Press. Other publications included the Pennsylvania Law Journal-Reporter, (no relation to Henry Wallace's first publication) founded in 1977 (with founding editor Karen Porter), later renamed Pennsylvania Law Weekly in 1993, Pennsylvania District and County Reports, which began publishing in 1923 and continues today with full-text opinions and analysis from Pennsylvania's trial courts; court rules services; Dorland's Medical Directory and other professional publications. The General Managers of the Publishing Division during the late 1970s and early 1980s were, respectively, Stanley A. Greene and Karen Porter.

In 1984, Brian R. Harris was named managing editor of The Legal Intelligencer and Sheryl S. Chernoff was named editor in chief. Harris went on to become editor in chief three years later.

When the city's two daily newspapers went on strike in 1985, the Legal printed a daily, four-page supplement providing general news of the day, business news and even TV listings.

In 1988, under publisher Joseph H. Weiss, the Legal underwent a major format revision. By hiring additional staff reporters and news services the Legal set out to be more than just a recorder of court depositions, but a full-fledged journalistic endeavor. Reporters covered important decisions and events in the legal and judicial communities and more information was provided in a timely fashion on significant national issues as well.

The Legal and the rest of the publishing division of Packard Press was acquired by Legal Communications Ltd. on August 23, 1989. Under the guidance of Richard H. Groves, president and publisher, the Legal continued to make improvements to its editorial content and service to the profession.

In 1992, for example, an editorial board was established featuring 20 prominent members of the legal community who meet monthly to discuss the important legal issues of the day and put their collective thoughts into a singular voice through a published editorial.

Groves left the publication in 1993, and Jane Seagrave was named publisher.

== Website ==
In 1995, Zan Hale was named managing editor, and Harris went on to help create www.palawnet.com, an Internet web site that combined the contents of all of the publications produced by The Legal Intelligencer and its affiliate publications.

In 1998, the Delaware Law Weekly was established, which serves the Delaware legal market in much the same way that the Pennsylvania Law Weekly serves the Pennsylvania market.

Later that year, Legal Communications, Ltd., was sold to American Lawyer Media, American Lawyer Media publisher of The National Law Journal and the American Lawyer magazine, American Lawyer as well as regional newspapers throughout the country. American Lawyer Media later changed its name to ALM. The Dorland's directories division was not included in that sale.

In 1999, Seagrave left the publication, and Marjorie Weiner was named publisher. In 2001, Hale left the publication, and Tracy Blitz Newman was named editor.

The paper continued to increase its coverage of the business of law during this time, while the palawnet.com website was absorbed into the national law.com network. The site later re-emerged as the website for The Legal Intelligencer, in 2003, while a joint venture with the Jenkins Law Library, retained many of the features of the old palawnet.com web site.

When Newman left the publication in 2002, Hank Grezlak, who started at the publication as a reporter in 1993 and later went on to run the books, directories and legal notice business of the publication, was named editor in chief and associate publisher.

Marjorie Weiner left the publication in 2005, and has since died. She was replaced by John Mason, who was then elevated to a post in the ALM corporate office in New York in 2007.

In 2007, Hal Cohen was named publisher, replacing Mason. Later that year, ALM was sold to Incisive Media.

In 2008, ALM was broken off from Incisive Media, once again becoming ALM.

== Awards ==
=== Keystone Press Awards ===
- 1996 First Place, Investigative Reporting, Hank Grezlak, Pennsylvania Law Weekly (for a series of articles pointing out how often the Commonwealth Court was being overturned by the Supreme Court and the problems caused by the Supreme Court splitting evenly 3-3 in cases because of a missing justice)
- 1997 Second Place, News Beat Reporting, Hank Grezlak, Pennsylvania Law Weekly
- 2006 First Place, Investigative Reporting, Asher Hawkins and Melissa Nann Burke, The Legal Intelligencer (for a series of articles investigating the money fueling judicial campaigns)

=== Schnader Print Media Awards ===
- 2000 Second Place, Daily, The Legal Intelligencer, Danielle Rodier, beat coverage
- 2000 First and Second Place, Weekly, for The Legal Intelligencer Suburban
- 2001 First Place, Weekly, Pennsylvania Law Weekly, Ruth Bryna Cohen, feature
- 2002 First Place, Weekly, Pennsylvania Law Weekly, Lori Litchman
- 2003 Second Place, Weekly, Pennsylvania Law Weekly, Chris Lilienthal, beat coverage
- 2004 First Place, Weekly, Pennsylvania Law Weekly, Chris Lilienthal, beat coverage
- 2005 First Place, Weekly, Pennsylvania Law Weekly, Chris Lilienthal, beat coverage
- 2006 Second Place, Daily, The Legal Intelligencer, Hank Grezlak, beat coverage
- 2006 First Place, Weekly, Pennsylvania Law Weekly
- 2007 First Place, Weekly, Pennsylvania Law Weekly, Dan Cummins
- 2008 Second Place, Daily and Weekly, Hank Grezlak, editorial/commentaries
