= Graham Sherren =

British publisher (born 1937)

- Born: Graham Veere Sherren; December 1937 (age 88)
- Occupation: Publisher
- Known for: Founder & former CEO of Centaur Media

Graham Veere Sherren (born December 1937) is a British publisher, the founder and former CEO of Centaur Media.

== Career ==
Sherren started his career in business-to-business publishing companies in 1964 with Product Journal Limited. Sherren was the CEO of Morgan Grampian PLC until 1981.

Sherren founded Centaur Media in 1981, and was its CEO until 2006, and its chairman until 2009.

Sherren and Centaur Media were responsible for many of the most successful British controlled free circulation B2B titles, the Lawyer, the Engineer, Employee Benefits, Design Week, Money Marketing, Marketing Week, Creative Review, and New Media Age.

Sherren floated Centaur in 2004, when it had 24 magazines and ran 20 exhibitions and 100 conferences.

Sherren is, or has been, a director of Abacus Software, General Cigar Holdings, Duplo International, Stace-Barr, Gieves Group, Hundred Acre Securities, InType, Gieves & Hawkes, and Culbro Corporation.
