= Anthony Nares =

British publisher (1942–1996)

- Born: Anthony James Nares; 17 December 1942
- Died: 19 February 1996 (aged 53); Klosters, Switzerland
- Education: Charterhouse School
- Occupation: Publisher
- Known for: founder, Marketing Week
- Spouse: Thomasin Gilbey
- Children: one son
- Parent: John George Alastair Nares
- Relatives: Vice-Admiral Sir George Nares (great-grandfather)

Anthony James Nares (17 December 1942 – 19 February 1996) was a British publisher.

== Early life ==
Anthony James Nares was born on 17 December 1942, the son of John George Alastair Nares. His grandfather was Vice-Admiral John Dodd Nares, and his great-grandfather was Vice-Admiral Sir George Nares.

He was educated at Charterhouse School, and in France, where he became fluent in French and Spanish.

== Career ==
In 1978, Nares founded Marketing Week Publications, and launched the magazine Marketing Week, in a partnership with Michael Chamberlain, who became the editor.

In 1982, Centaur Media, run by his friend Graham Sherren, bought Marketing Week, and Nares became Centaur's managing director.

== Personal life ==
In 1975, Nares married Thomasin Gilbey, and they had one son together.

On 19 February 1996, he was killed in an avalanche while skiing in Klosters, Switzerland.
