= Midwife (disambiguation) =

A midwife is a health professional who cares for mothers and newborns around childbirth.

Midwife may also refer to:

== Film ==
- The Midwife, a 2017 French film
- The Midwife (2015 film), a Finnish film

== Music ==
- Midwife (artist), a stage name of American musician Madeline Johnston

=== Songs ===
- "Midwife" (song), a 1999 song by Paul McCartney
- "Midwife", by Dir En Grey from the 2014 album Arche
- "Midwife", by Peter Mulvey from the 1992 album Brother Rabbit Speaks
- "Midwife", by Peter Mulvey from the 1997 album Deep Blue

== See also ==
- or Midwife in any form
- Midwives (disambiguation)
