= The American Lawyer =

American legal magazine

- Editor-in-chief: David Gialanella
- Former editors: Gina Passarella
- Categories: Legal magazine
- Frequency: Monthly
- Founder: Steven Brill
- Founded: 1979
- Company: ALM
- Country: United States
- Based in: New York City, U.S.
- Language: English
- Website: Law.com
- ISSN: 0162-3397

The American Lawyer is a monthly legal magazine and website published by ALM Media. The periodical and its parent company, ALM (then American Lawyer Media), were founded in 1979 by Steven Brill.

== Activity ==
In 1983, journalist and lawyer Tom Goldstein wrote an in-depth review of The American Lawyer that was published by the Columbia Law Review, observing that, following "a series of court decisions since 1977" that allowed self-promotion by lawyers; the magazine was the first to treat law as a business, rather than solely as a profession.

In 1986, American Lawyer Media purchased Review Business Publications of Miami, which included four southern Florida newspapers: Broward Review, Palm Beach Review, Miami Review, and South Florida Medical Review.

Warner Media, (later TimeWarner), a minority shareholder in the company, acquired Brill's stake in 1997. That July, TimeWarner Inc. sold American Lawyer Media's print holdings to Wasserstein Perella & Co.

The company was acquired, in 2001, by Dresdner Bank, then renamed Dresdner Kleinwort Wasserstein (DrKW). Dresdner subsequently merged with Allianz. In 2007, ALM was purchased by Incisive Media for US$630 million. In 2014, Wasserstein & Co. led a group of investors that acquired ALM Media from Incisive parent Apax Partners and its creditor Royal Bank of Scotland.

The publication also sponsors annually The American Lawyer Industry Awards.

== Publications ==
The website of The American Lawyer, Law.com, publishes daily headline news pertinent to the business of law. Publications include:

- The "Am Law 100" and "Am Law 200" surveys rank United States law firms by revenue per lawyer, compensation, profits per lawyer, profitability index, value per lawyer, profits per equity partner, and overall revenue
- The Global 100 — annual ranking of the world's 100 largest law firms across the globe by overall revenue, by number of lawyers per firm, and by profits per equity partner
- The A-List — annual ranking of the most well-rounded, elite law firms in the United States. The A-List has recognized firms based on a combination of factors, both financial and cultural: revenue per lawyer, pro bono commitment, associate satisfaction and racial diversity, with RPL and pro bono given double weight. Also included since 2017 are scores for gender diversity — specifically, the percentage of women equity partners
- Diversity Scorecard — an annual record of the average number of full-time-equivalent minority attorneys
- "The View From the Top" — annual poll of law firm chairpersons
- "Corporate Scorecard" — performance reports of U.S. law firms with the most active corporate finance and capital markets practices
