= EMS Magazine =

EMS Magazine may refer to:

- EMS Magazine (Emergency Medical Services) (2007–2010), successor of Emergency Medical Services (1972–2007), now called EMS World (2010–)
- EMS Magazine (European Mathematical Society) (2021–), successor of the EMS Newsletter (1991–2021)
