= The National Law Journal =

National newspapers published in the United States

- Type: Monthly
- Format: Magazine
- Owner: ALM
- Founder: Jerry Finkelstein
- Publisher: ALM -Tom Larragana
- Editor-in-chief: Lisa Helem
- Managing editor: Mark Bauer
- News editor: Michael Scarcella
- Campus chief: Beth Frerking
- Founded: 1978
- Language: English
- Headquarters: Washington, DC, United States
- Sister newspapers: American Lawyer, Corporate Counsel Magazine, The New York Law Journal
- ISSN: 0162-7325
- Website: www.law.com/nationallawjournal/

The National Law Journal (NLJ) is an American legal periodical founded in 1978. The NLJ was created by Jerry Finkelstein, who envisioned it as a "sibling newspaper" of the New York Law Journal.

Originally a tabloid-sized weekly newspaper, the NLJ is now a monthly magazine that publishes online daily. The NLJ is owned by ALM (formerly American Lawyer Media). In September 2017, Lisa Helem was promoted to editor in chief.

== Content and publications ==
The National Law Journal reports legal information of national importance to attorneys, including federal circuit court decisions, verdicts, practitioners' columns, coverage of legislative issues and legal news for the business and private sectors. The journal releases its list of the "100 Most Influential Lawyers in America" once every few years.

The NLJ conducts surveys on issues of pertinence to the legal profession. In 1998, the NLJ released a survey that found that 82 percent of partners in large law firms believe their practice "changed for the worse" as a result of what The Washington Post deems the "gradual transition of the law from profession to business".
