= Sandlapper =

Sandlapper or Sandlappers may refer to:

- A resident of South Carolina (see List of demonyms for U.S. states and territories)
- Sandlapper (magazine), a South Carolina magazine
- Sandlapper 200, NASCAR stock car race
- Columbia Sandlappers, minor league baseball team that became the Asheville Tourists
- Lava bear or sand lapper, a variety of black bear once found in Oregon, United States
