= Inside Market Data =

Inside Market Data is a weekly newsletter published by Incisive Media providing news for the financial market data industry.

It was launched in 1985 by Waters, later Risk Waters Group, which in 2003 was acquired by Incisive Media.
