= The National Law Review =

U.S. journal, news and analysis database

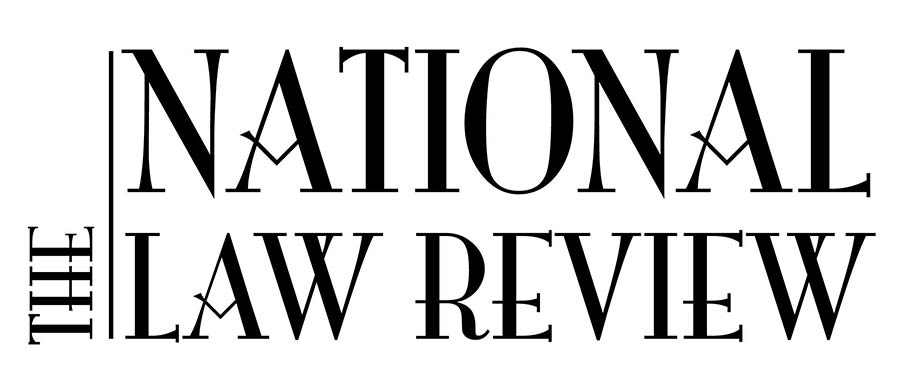

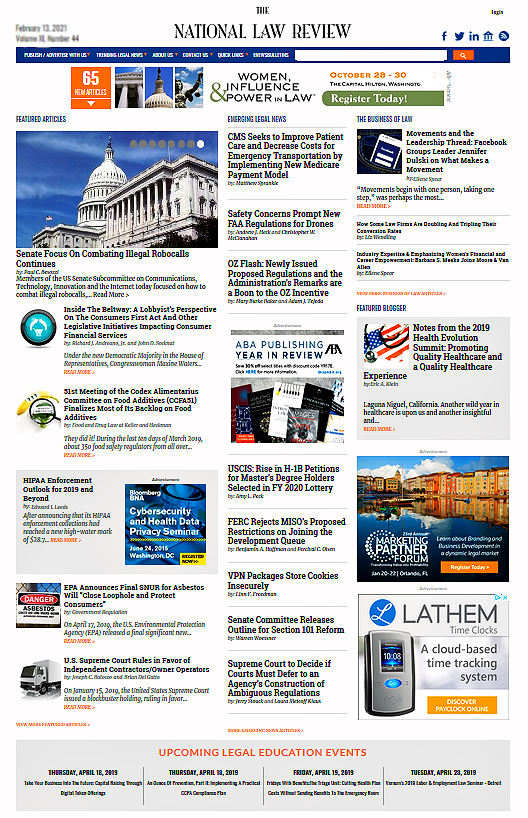
- Cover page of the February 13, 2021 issue of The National Law Review
- Categories: Online Legal periodical
- Frequency: Daily
- Format: Online Newspaper
- First issue: 2008
- Company: National Law Forum L.L.C.
- Country: United States
- Based in: Chicago, Illinois
- Language: English
- Website: natlawreview.com
- ISSN: 2161-3362
- OCLC: 722392873

The National Law Review is an American law journal, daily legal news website and legal analysis content-aggregating database. Started in 2008 as a research tool, the site offers hourly legal news updates and analysis of recent court decisions, regulatory changes and legislative actions and includes both original content and content submitted by various professionals in the legal and business communities. It has become one of the most widely read business law websites in the United States. It includes podcasts and videos as well as articles, and specializes in business and commercial issues, including U.S. banking law, financial regulation, tax law, consumer protection and product liability, and intellectual property issues such as copyright, trademark, and patents. Other legal fields covered include civil procedure, criminal law, environment law, family law, health law, insurance law, property law, and torts.

== History ==
The National Law Review was founded in 2008 by corporate attorneys and internet professionals in order to provide an easily accessible and reliable resource of litigation and regulatory news articles written by vetted experts analyzing legal news and trends. It has been used as a reference source to other legal periodicals, and as a resource on legal issues for mainstream media.

In 2020 and 2021, The National Law Review published over 20,000 legal news articles and experienced an uptick in readership averaging 4.3 million readers in both March and April 2020, due to the demand for news regarding the COVID-19 pandemic. Submissions on regulatory changes and state and federal court rulings then slowed somewhat in 2022 to an average of 350 new articles per week.

Since 2018, The National Law Review has honored approximately 75 noteworthy legal authors each year through its Go To Thought Leadership Awards.
