= Construction Innovation =

Construction research journal

Construction Innovation: Information, Process, Management
- Discipline: Construction management, innovation management, built environment
- Language: English
- Edited by: Srinath Perera, Peng Wu

Publication details
- Former name: International Journal of Construction Information Technology
- History: 1992–present
- Publisher: Emerald Group Publishing
- Frequency: Quarterly
- Open access: Hybrid
- Impact factor: 3.5 (2025)

Indexing
- ISSN: 1471-4175 (print); 1477-0857 (web)

Links
- Journal homepage; Online access

Construction Innovation: Information, Process, Management is a peer-reviewed academic journal covering managerial and technological innovation in the construction industry and the built environment. The journal is published by Emerald Group Publishing. The journal is one of the partner journals endorsed by the International Council for Research and Innovation in Building and Construction (CIB).

== History ==
The journal was established in 1992 as the International Journal of Construction Information Technology. The journal was renamed Construction Innovation when Arnold Publishers took over in 2001. It was then acquired by Emerald in 2006. Its print and electronic ISSNs are ISSN 1471-4175 and ISSN 1477-0857, respectively.

== Editors ==
The journal is co-edited by Professor Srinath Perera (Western Sydney University) and Professor Peng Wu (Curtin University).

== Journal metrics ==
According to the publisher, the journal had a 2025 impact factor of 3.5 and a five-year impact factor of 3.9.
