= Journal of Building Physics =

- Discipline: Engineering
- Language: English
- Edited by: Dominique Derome

Publication details
- Former names: Journal of Thermal Envelope and Building Science, Journal of Thermal Insulation and Building Envelopes (until 1992): Journal of Thermal Insulation (United States) (0148-8287)
- History: 1977-present
- Publisher: SAGE Publications
- Frequency: Quarterly
- Impact factor: 1.027 (2013)

Standard abbreviations
- ISO 4: J. Build. Phys.

Indexing
- CODEN: JBPOAL
- ISSN: 1744-2591 (print); 1744-2583 (web)
- LCCN: 2005240592
- OCLC no.: 61523009

Links
- Journal homepage; Online access; Online archive

The Journal of Building Physics is a peer-reviewed scientific journal that covers the field of building construction. The editor-in-chief is Dominique Derome (Université of Sherbrooke). It was established in 1979 and is published by SAGE Publications in association with International Council for Research and Innovation in Building and Construction.

== Abstracting and indexing ==
The journal is abstracted and indexed in Scopus and the Science Citation Index Expanded. According to the Journal Citation Reports, its 2023 impact factor is 2.69.
