= Design Week =

British website covering design industry

- Screenshot of the website in December 2024
- Executive Editor: David Coveney
- Former editors: Rob Alderson, Tom Banks, Angus Montgomery, Lynda Relph-Knight, Jeremy Myerson
- Categories: Design, Business
- Publisher: David Coveney
- Founder: Jeremy Myerson
- Founded: 1986
- First issue: October 1986
- Final issue: 2011
- Company: Design Week Ltd
- Country: UK
- Based in: Liverpool
- Language: English
- Website: www.designweek.co.uk
- ISSN: 0950-3676

Design Week is a UK-based website, and formerly a weekly magazine, for the design industry. It was first published in October 1986 by Centaur Communications. According to the Audit Bureau of Circulations primary circulation for 2007 was 8,074. In 2011, Design Week became a digital-only publication.

On 22 January 2019, Centaur Media announced that Design Week had become part of Xeim, a rebranded marketing division. On 22 December 2023, Centaur Media announced the decision to cease publication of Design Week with immediate effect.

In May 2024, Design Week was saved from closure after it was acquired by its web development company Interconnect. The website was relaunched with a new design and branding on the 7 October 2024.

== Details ==
Design Week is a business publication distinct from design-focused publications like Wallpaper and Creative Review. Its competitors included Brand Republic and Marketing Week. Its readers came from commercial design disciplines which range from retail, products and packaging to graphics, interiors, exhibitions and digital.

The founding editor of Design Week was Jeremy Myerson and the title was edited for more than 20 years by Lynda Relph-Knight. It was edited until 2016 by Angus Montgomery, who took the title online-only, and the final editor whilst the brand was owned by Centaur was Tom Banks. Under its new ownership the editor hired for the relaunch was Rob Alderson.

Back issues to 1995 included contemporary design news and interviews/retrospectives of noteworthy but not widely known designers since c.1960, e.g. Raymond Hawkey and Frank Stephenson.
