= Midwives (disambiguation) =

Midwives are professionals trained to assist women in childbirth.

Midwives may also refer to:

- Midwives (magazine), the magazine of the Royal College of Midwives
- Midwives (novel), a novel by Chris Bohjalian
- Midwives (2001 film), an America television film based on the 1997 novel Midwives
- Midwives (2022 film), a Burmese documentary film

== See also ==
- Midwife (disambiguation)
- Call the Midwife (book), the first book in a trilogy by Jennifer Worth
- Call the Midwife, BBC television period drama based on Worth's trilogy
