= George Goodheart =

American chiropractor

- Born: George Joseph Goodheart Jr. August 18, 1918 Detroit, Michigan
- Died: March 5, 2008 (aged 89) Grosse Pointe Farms, Michigan
- Occupation: Chiropractor
- Spouse: JoAnn Dutts; Catherine Carroll
- Children: 3

George Joseph Goodheart Jr., D.C. (August 18, 1918 – March 5, 2008) was a chiropractor who invented applied kinesiology.

== Career ==
Goodheart attended the University of Detroit and the National College of Chiropractic. After graduating in 1939, he practiced in downtown Detroit with his father, George Goodheart, Sr., for over 30 years. He moved to an office in Grosse Pointe, where he made observations about muscle function and health and introduced Applied Kinesiology.

Goodheart served in the United States Army Air Forces during World War II, and was stationed in France and England. He was a Major at the age of 26 and was awarded the Bronze Star for inventing an electronic bombing release mechanism for P-47 ground attack missions, replacing an inaccurate mechanical mechanism .

In 1964 he originated applied kinesiology and began teaching it to other chiropractors.

An organization of Goodheart Study Group Leaders began meeting in 1973 and The International College of Applied Kinesiology (ICAK) was founded in 1975 to provide instruction on Goodheart's research to interested health care professionals. Goodheart served as chairman of the Research Committee for the ICAK for 32 years.

Goodheart authored many works on Applied Kinesiology and lectured on the topic frequently.

== First official US Olympic team chiropractor ==
In 1979 Goodheart accompanied the US Olympic team to Lake Placid, New York, in the XIIIth Olympic Winter Games as the first official US Olympic team chiropractor.

== Private life ==
Goodheart first married Catherine Carroll and had three children and several grandchildren. After she died he married JoAnn Dutts, with whom he did not have any children. Goodheart died March 5, 2008, at the age of 89.

== Bibliography ==
Goodheart published the following works relating to Applied Kinesiology:

=== Manuals ===
Applied Kinesiology Research Manuals (published yearly from 1964–1998)

=== Books ===
You'll Be Better - The Story of Applied Kinesiology (privately published, made available in spiral bound in 2000)
Collected Published Articles & Reprints (1969)
Observation of Sonagraphic Computerized Analysis (1981)
A New Approach To An Old Problem (1990)
Collected Published Articles & Reprints (1992)
Being A Family Doctor (1993)

=== Articles ===
The following articles were published in Chiropractic Economics magazine:

- Urinary testing methods 7(1);July/Aug 1964:14
- Arm and shoulder pain 7(2);Sept/Oct 1964:22-25
- The anemias 7(3); Nov/Dec 1964:32-33
- Postural hypotension and functional hypoadrenia 7(6);May/June 1965:24-25
- Control of cholesterol 8(1);Jul/Aug 1965: 44-45
- The acid-alkaline balance 8(2);Sep/Oct 1965:32-33
- Fatigue and its management Chiro Econ, 8(3);Nov/Dec 1965:28-30
- Posture - Its effect on structure...function and symptoms 8(4);Jan/Feb 1966:30-33
- Chinese lessons for chiropractic 8(5);Mar/Apr 1966:10-11
- The respiratory function of the skull 8(6);May/Jun 1966:20
- Nutritional factors 9(2);Sep/Oct 1966:54-56
- The ileo-cecal valve syndrome 9(6);May/Jun 1967:32-33
- The carpal tunnel syndrome 10(1);Jul/Aug 1967: 28-29
- The psoas muscle and the foot pronation problem 10(2);Sep/Oct 1967:54-57
- Hyperventilation and cranial sacral mechanism 10(3);Nov/Dec 1967:48-49
- The hiatus hernia 10(4);Jan/Feb 1968:31-33
- Headache 10(5);Mar/Apr 1968:22-24
- Asthma and emphysema 11(1); Jul/Aug 1968:22-24
- Hypertension 11(3);Nov/Dec 1968:20-23
- Cross-pattern crawling and muscle spasm 11(5);Mar/Apr 1969:18-20
- The "frozen shoulder" syndrome 12(1);Jul/Aug 1969:36-38
- Allergies in chiropractic practice 12(3);Nov/Dec 1969:12-14
- Principles of muscle balancing 12(5);Mar/Apr 1970:30-32
- The schizophrenic pattern 13(1);Jul/Aug 1970:51-53
- Structural imbalance and nutritional absorption (a new route to the brain) 13(3);Nov/Dec 1970:20-23
- Tarsal tunnel syndrome 13(5);Mar/Apr 1971:6-7
- Sacroiliac and ilio sacral problems 14(4);Jan/Feb 1972: 44-46
- Sacroiliac and ilio sacral problems, Part 2 15(1);Jul/Aug 1972:42-45
- The cervical challenge 15(2);Sep/Oct 1972:36-39
- The R.N.A. meridian relationship to applied kinesiology 15(5);Mar/Apr 1973:28-32
- The fixation vertebral pattern 16(1);Jul/Aug 1973:44-46
- Innate and the interdependent triangularity of man 16(4);Jan/Feb 1974:22-25
- Cranial sacral nutritional reflexes 16(6);May/Jun 1974:26-33
- Applied Kinesiology 17(2);Sep/Oct 1974:36-38
- The antenna concept in chiropractic meridian therapy 17(5);Mar/Apr 1975:36-41
- Gait and associated problems 18(1);Jul/Aug 1975:14-17
- Applied kinesiology & Golgi tendon organ spindle cell 18(3);Nov/Dec 1975:18-19
- Temporal mandibular joint - The most important joint in the body 20(2);Sep/Oct 1977:18-20
- Cranial technique: A clarification of certain principles 20(3);Nov-Dec 1977:26-29
- Hypothyroidism and myofascial relationships 21(1);Jul/Aug 1978: 40-41
- Reactive muscle testing 21(4);Jan/Feb 1979:22-27
- The interosseous vertebral holographic subluxation, Part 1 29(2);Sep/Oct 1986:44-47
- The interosseous vertebral holographic subluxation, Part 2 Chiro Econ, 29(3);Nov/Dec 1986: 44-47
- Posture: 30 years of observation and some logical chiropractic conclusions, Part 1 30(1);Jul/Aug 1987:14-16
- Posture: 30 years of observation and some logical chiropractic conclusions, Part 2 30(2);Sep/Oct 1987:34-41
- Posture: 30 years of observation and some logical chiropractic conclusions, Part 3 30(3);Nov/Dec 1987:62-67
- Pitch, roll, and yaw technic, Part 1 30(5);Mar/Apr 1988:126-130
- Pitch, roll and yaw technic, Part 2 30(6);May/Jun 1988:46-51
- The limbic technic 31(2);Sep/Oct 1988:22-31
- Applied kinesiology - the beginning 31(6);May/Jun 1989:15-23
- Do herniated discs produce pain? 34(5);Mar-Apr 1992:14-22

The following articles were published in Today’s Chiropractic magazine:

- Structural imbalance and nutritional absorption 16(1);Mar/Apr 1987:19-24
- Combating a vitamin B deficiency 17(2);Mar/Apr 1988: 19-22
- The applied kinesiology technique 22(4);Jul/Aug 1993:56-58

The following articles were published in The American Chiropractor magazine:

- Managing lactic acid excess Sep 1989:48-52
- Structural imbalance and nutritional absorption Oct 1989:40-44
