= Money market (disambiguation) =

The money market is a component of the economy.

Money market may also refer to:

- Money market account, a type of bank deposit account
- Money market fund, a type of mutual fund
- Qianshi Hutong (Money Market Hutong), a street in Beijing, China

== See also ==
- Money Marketing, a UK financial magazine
