= Srinath Perera =

- Srinath Perera
- Education: University of Moratuwa; University of Salford
- Awards: Vice-Chancellor's Award for Excellence in Postgraduate Research, Training and Supervision (2024)
- Scientific career
- Fields: Built environment, Construction management, Quantity surveying, Construction economics
- Workplaces: Western Sydney University; Northumbria University

Srinath Perera is an academic in construction management and quantity surveying. He is the Chair Professor of Built Environment and Construction Management and Head of Discipline for Quantity Surveying and Project Management at Western Sydney University, and editor-in-chief of the journal Construction Innovation. He is the founding director of the university's Centre for Smart Modern Construction (c4SMC). His research interests include construction informatics, building information modelling, digital twins, blockchain, sustainability and construction economics.

== Education ==
Perera received a BSc (Hons) in Quantity Surveying from the University of Moratuwa in 1991, and an MSc in Information Technology in Property and Construction in 1995 and a PhD in 1997 from the University of Salford.

== Career ==
Perera began his academic career at the University of Moratuwa and later worked at Ulster University. He was Professor of Construction Economics at Northumbria University from 2009 to 2016 before joining Western Sydney University in 2016. At Western Sydney University, Perera established the Centre for Smart Modern Construction. He serves on the Governing Board of the International Council for Research and Innovation in Building and Construction (CIB) and is founding chair of its Future Leaders Committee. He is also president of the Australasian Universities Building Education Association (AUBEA). Perera is the editor-in-chief of Construction Innovation. He was elected a Fellow of the Royal Society of New South Wales in 2017.

== Awards and honours ==
- 2017 – Fellow of the Royal Society of New South Wales.
- 2019 – Professional Excellence in Building Award, Research, Development and Technology, Australian Institute of Building.
- 2024 – Vice-Chancellor's Award for Excellence in Postgraduate Research, Training and Supervision, Western Sydney University.

== Selected works ==
- Ashworth, Allan; Perera, Srinath (2015). Cost Studies of Buildings (6th ed.). Routledge. doi:10.4324/9781315708867. ISBN 978-1-138-01735-1.
- Ashworth, Allan; Perera, Srinath (2018). Contractual Procedures in the Construction Industry (7th ed.). Routledge. doi:10.1201/9781315529059. ISBN 978-1-138-69392-0.
- Perera, Srinath; Nanayakkara, Samudaya; Rodrigo, M. N. N.; Senaratne, Sepani; Weinand, Robert (2020). "Blockchain technology: Is it hype or real in the construction industry?". Journal of Industrial Information Integration. 17 100125. doi:10.1016/j.jii.2020.100125.
