= Post magazine =

Post magazine may refer to:

- Australasian Post, a defunct Australian weekly magazine (1864–2002)
- Post Magazine, a British magazine
- Saturday Evening Post, an American magazine
