= Silver Ladders =

Silver Ladders may refer to:

- Silver Ladders (composition), an orchestral composition by Joan Tower
- Silver Ladders (album), a 2020 album by Mary Lattimore

== See also ==
- Silver Ladder, a 2014 album by Peter Mulvey
