= Outdoor USA Magazine =

Trade publication for the North American outdoor industry

Outdoor USA Magazine is a paper and online trade publication for the North American outdoor industry. The magazine is distributed to outdoor retailers, manufacturers, sales representatives and other industry stakeholders. As a trade publication it reports on news relevant to its industry. It is published on a monthly basis.
