= Kitchen Radio =

Studio album by Peter Mulvey
- Released: March 9, 2004
- Recorded: June 15 – 21, 2003
- Genre: Folk
- Length: 44:53
- Label: Signature Sounds
- Producer: David Goodrich

Peter Mulvey chronology
Ten Thousand Mornings (2002)	Kitchen Radio (2004)	The Knuckleball Suite (2006)

Kitchen Radio is the sixth album by American singer/songwriter Peter Mulvey, released in 2004.

== Reception ==
Professional ratings
Review scores
Source	Rating
Allmusic	3/5 stars

Writing for Allmusic, critic Ronnie D. Lankford Jr. wrote of the album, "Even the listener wishing for greater clarity will nonetheless appreciate the simple arrangements and clean production of Kitchen Radio, highlighted by acoustic and electric guitars and vacillating between tasteful folk and rock. Kitchen Radio is a well-wrought effort with a nicely honed sound that will please anyone who enjoys thoughtful songwriting."

== Track listing ==
1. "Road to Mallow" (Peter Mulvey) – 3:08
2. "Shirt" (Mulvey, David "Goody" Goodrich) – 3:10
3. "29¢ Head" (Mulvey, Goodrich) – 3:38
4. "Falling" (Mulvey, Goodrich) – 3:48
5. "Charlie" (Mulvey, Goodrich, Paul Cebar) – 3:09
6. "Denver, 6 a.m." (Mulvey, Goodrich) – 4:05
7. "Rise" (Mulvey, Goodrich) – 3:15
8. "Bloomington" (Mulvey, Goodrich) – 3:40
9. "Me & Albert" (Mulvey) – 2:56
10. "You" (Mulvey, Goodrich) – 4:08
11. "Thirty" (Mulvey, Goodrich) – 3:37
12. "Toad" (Mulvey) – 3:31
13. "Sad, Sad, Sad, Sad (And Faraway from Home)" (Mulvey) – 2:48

== Personnel ==
- Peter Mulvey – vocals, acoustic guitar
- Kris Delmhorst – vocals
- David "Goody" Goodrich – guitar
- Mike Piehl – drums
- Anita Suhanin – vocals
- Paul Cebar – vocals
- Lou Ulrich – bass

== Production notes ==
- David "Goody" Goodrich – producer
- Bob St. John – mastering
- Amy Ruppel – design, photography
