= Cranes Today =

- Established: 1972
- Type: Global lifting industry's longest running magazine
- Headquarters: John Carpenter Street; London, EC4Y 0AN
- Region served: Worldwide
- Fields: Crane-related matters
- Key people: Christian Shelton (Editor); Joe Woolerton (Publication Manager)
- Website: www.cranestodaymagazine.com

Cranes Today is an international monthly trade magazine for the crane and lifting industries, published by GlobalData PLC.

It was first published in November 1972, making it the global lifting industry’s longest-running magazine, and has been recognised as the leading journal for the crane industry globally.

The current editor of Cranes Today is Christian Shelton.

Cranes Today remains committed to producing 12 editions per year, and is the only publication serving the industry with an audited circulation. Each edition is distributed to 59,850 monthly subscribers.
