= Glencree (album) =

Live album by Peter Mulvey
- Released: January 1, 1999
- Genre: Folk
- Label: Black Walnut
- Producer: David Goodrich

Peter Mulvey chronology
Deep Blue (1997)	Glencree (1999)	The Trouble with Poets (2000)

Glencree is a live album by American singer/songwriter Peter Mulvey, released in 1999. The songs were recorded during three 1998 performances in Ireland.

== Reception ==
Professional ratings
Review scores
Source	Rating
Allmusic	4.5/5 stars

Writing for Allmusic, critic Evan Cator praised Mulvey's "thunderously masterful fretwork [which] makes him a heart stopping live performer." while also noting "the record suffers from questionable song selection... But Mulvey's bristling intelligence and crafty instrumentalism more than compensate for these shortcomings, and Glencree is likely to leave listeners anxiously scouring their local concert listings for his next eye-popping performance."

== Track listing ==
1. "The Trouble With Poets" (Mulvey, Goodrich) – 3:56
2. "Tender Blindspot" (Mulvey) – 4:01
3. "Better Way to Go" (Mulvey) – 3:30
4. "Ithaca" – 3:12
5. "Hard Times Come Again No More" (Stephen Foster) – 3:45
6. "Brand New ‘64 Dodge" (Greg Brown) – 3:55
7. "Stephen's Green" (Mulvey, Goodrich) – 3:40
8. "Smoke" (Mulvey) – 4:06
9. "If I Were" (Pamela Means) – 3:31
10. "Stretched on Your Grave" (Philip King, Frank O’Connor, arr. Mulvey/Goodrich) – 5:54

== Personnel ==
- Peter Mulvey – vocals, guitar
- David "Goody" Goodrich – guitar
- Juliet Turner – vocals on "Hard Times Come Again No More" and "If I Were"
