= Investment Week =

- Categories: Trade magazine
- Frequency: Weekly
- Circulation: 14,600 (2009)
- First issue: 30 January 1995
- Company: Incisive Media
- Country: United Kingdom
- Based in: London
- Language: English
- Website: www.investmentweek.co.uk
- ISSN: 1469-1876

Investment Week is an investments magazine that covers news, fund performance and sector analysis for investment professionals. The magazine was started by Incisive Media and the first issue appeared on 30 January 1995.

The physical magazine ceased circulation on 28 March 2022 and has since become a digital-only publication.
