= Ten Thousand Mornings =

Live album by Peter Mulvey
- Released: 2002
- Genre: Folk
- Length: 37:39
- Label: Signature Sounds

Peter Mulvey chronology
| The Trouble with Poets (2000) | Ten Thousand Mornings (2002) | Kitchen Radio (2004) |

Ten Thousand Mornings is an album by American singer/songwriter Peter Mulvey, released in 2002.

== Reception ==
Professional ratings
Review scores
| Source | Rating |
|---|---|
| Allmusic | 3/5 stars |

Writing for Allmusic, critic Ronnie D. Lankford, Jr. wrote of the album, "Mulvey's unusual covers and smart interpretations deliver fresh, non-pretentious takes on these tunes... Ten Thousand Mornings shows that even rock and pop songs can be altered into lovely acoustic music."

== Track listing ==
1. "Stranded in a Limousine" (Paul Simon) – 2:37
2. "Inner City Blues (Make Me Wanna Holler)" (Marvin Gaye, James Nyx, Jr.) – 3:11
3. "Comes Love" (Sam H. Stept, Lew Brown, Charles Tobias) – 3:26
4. "Two Janes" (David Hidalgo, Louie Pérez) – 3:43
5. "Running Up the Stairs" (Leo Kottke) – 3:10
6. "Mama, You Been on My Mind" (Bob Dylan) – 2:03
7. "Caleb Meyer" (David Rawlings, Gillian Welch) – 3:32
8. "In Germany Before the War" (Randy Newman) – 3:17
9. "Oliver's Army" (Elvis Costello) – 2:48
10. "For No One" (John Lennon, Paul McCartney) – 2:08
11. "Rain and Snow" (Traditional) – 2:53
12. "The Ocean" (Dar Williams) – 4:51

== Personnel ==
- Peter Mulvey – vocals, guitar
- Chris Smither – vocals, guitar on "Stranded in a Limousine"
- David "Goody" Goodrich – guitar on "Comes Love" and "Running Up the Stairs"
- Mike Piehl – drums, background vocals on "Oliver's Army"
- Jennifer Kimball – vocals
- Erin McKeown – vocals on "Comes Love"
- Anita Suhanin – vocals on "For No One"
- Sean Staples – mandolin, background vocals on "Mama, You Been on My Mind"
- Lou Ulrich – bass

== Production notes ==
- Dave Chalfant – mixing
- Marc Donahue – mastering
- Liz Linder – photography
