= Notes from Elsewhere =

Notes From Elsewhere

Studio album by Peter Mulvey
- Released: November 6, 2007
- Recorded: 2007
- Genre: Americana, Folk music
- Length: 59:03
- Label: Signature Sounds
- Producer: Peter Mulvey

Peter Mulvey chronology
The Knuckleball Suite (2006)	Notes From Elsewhere (2007)	Letters from a Flying Machine (2009)

Professional ratings
Review scores
Source	Rating
AllMusic	3.5/5 stars

Notes from Elsewhere is an album from American singer/songwriter Peter Mulvey, released in 2007. Notes from Elsewhere is a retrospective compilation of songs Mulvey has recorded and performed over his career. They have all been re-recorded solo in the studio with just acoustic guitar.

== Track listing ==
All tracks by Peter Mulvey unless noted.

1. "Shirt" (David Goodrich, Peter Mulvey) – 3:32
2. "Better Way to Go" – 3:42
3. "The Dreams" – 1:50
4. "Old Simon Stimson" – 2:57
5. "Rapture" – 4:03
6. "The Trouble with Poets" (Goodrich, Mulvey) – 3:32
7. "Grace" (Goodrich, Mulvey) – 3:27
8. "Black Rabbit" – 3:10
9. "If Love Is Not Enough" – 4:07
10. "The Knuckleball Suite" – 3:35
11. "Every Word Except Goodbye" (Goodrich, Mulvey) – 3:57
12. "Charlie" (Cebar, Goodrich, Mulvey) – 3:38
13. "Tender Blindspot" – 4:05
14. "On the Way Up – 3:49
15. "Wings of the Ragman" (Goodrich, Mulvey) – 3:33
16. "Words Too Small to Say" (Goodrich, Mulvey) – 3:47
17. "Little Foot" – 1:29

== Personnel ==
- Peter Mulvey – acoustic guitar, vocals

== Production notes ==
- Produced by Peter Mulvey
- Engineered by Ric Probst and Al Williams
- Mixed and mastered by Ric Probst
- Design by Meghan Dewar
