= The Good Stuff (Peter Mulvey album) =

Studio album by Peter Mulvey
- Released: March 26, 2012
- Recorded: August 2011, Pomfret, Connecticut
- Genre: Indie music, Folk music
- Length: 49:18
- Label: Signature Sounds
- Producer: David Goodrich, Peter Mulvey

Peter Mulvey chronology
Letters from a Flying Machine (2009)	The Good Stuff (2012)	Silver Ladder (2014)

The Good Stuff is an album by American singer-songwriter Peter Mulvey, released in 2012.

== Reception ==
Professional ratings
Review scores
Source	Rating
The Daily Telegraph	4/5 stars
PopMatters	6/10 stars

Martin Chilton of The Telegraph wrote of the album "That it all came together wonderfully is a testament to Mulvey, his band's musicianship and the choice of original, interesting and varied songs.". Kiel Hauck of PopMatters wrote "While a few of the tracks on The Good Stuff feel a bit tired and re-hashed, the album as a whole is quite pleasing and captures the essence of folk music in true form."

== Track listing ==
1. "Sad And Blue" (Melvern Taylor) – 4:08
2. "Everybody Knows" (Leonard Cohen) – 4:28
3. "Are You Sure?" (Willie Nelson, Buddy Emmons) – 2:59
4. "(I Don't Know Why) But I Do" (Bobby Charles, Clarence "Frogman" Henry) – 3:53
5. "Time To Spend" (Chris Smither) – 3:07
6. "Egg Radio" (Bill Frisell) – 3:39
7. "Green Grass" (Tom Waits, Kathleen Brennan) – 3:28
8. "Mood Indigo" ( Duke Ellington, Barney Bigard, Irving Mills) – 3:27
9. "Old Fashioned Morphine" (Jolie Holland) – 3:55
10. "High Noon" (David Goodrich) – 3:04
11. "No Sugar" (Tim Gearan) – 2:47
12. "Sugar" (Anita Suhanin) – 2:58
13. "Richard Pryor Addresses A Tearful Nation" (Joseph Lee Henry) – 5:13
14. "Ruby, My Dear" (Thelonious Monk) – 2:12

== Personnel ==
- Peter Mulvey - vocals, acoustic guitar, banjo
- Kris Delmhorst – vocals
- David Goodrich – guitar, vocals
- Randy Sabien – organ, piano, violin
- Paul Kochanski – upright bass
- Jason Smith – drums
- Barry Rothman – turntables

== Production notes ==
- Peter Mulvey – producer
- David Goodrich – producer
- Mark Thayer – engineer, mixing
- Ian Kennedy – mastering
- Allie Justice – design
- Jim Dingilian – cover photo
