= Game Industry Report Magazine =

American video game trade magazine

The Gaming Industry Report Magazine (or GIR Magazine for short) was a subscription-based bimonthly video game trade journal that was published by GNB News Group until 2006.

The Gaming Industry Report Magazine was shut down in 2006. However, it was relaunched as a free online magazine by GNB News Group in January 2006. Then in 2007 JEMS Media Group had plans to relaunch the publication in 2007 as a video game newspaper instead of a magazine.

The Gaming Industry Report is currently being run by Jeremy Meyer who holds the position of publisher and editor in chief.

The magazine covers all aspects of the business of the video game industry in the US, regulation, technology, finance, and journalism.
