= Post Magazine =

British magazine

Post
- Categories: Trade magazine
- First issue: 25 July 1840
- Company: Infopro Digital
- Country: United Kingdom
- Language: English
- Website: postonline.co.uk

Post Magazine is a British magazine.

It first appeared on Saturday 25 July 1840, just seven months after the introduction of the Penny Post postal system and was the first publication anywhere in the world to be sent by post – hence its name.

Aimed at the UK's general insurance industry, it also organises the all-party parliamentary group on insurance and financial services.

The magazine is published by Infopro Digital and underwent an image change in September 2011. Its editor is Emma Ann Hughes.

Post Magazine also organises the annual British Insurance Awards, which are usually held in July at the Royal Albert Hall.

== See also ==
- List of trade magazines
