= New York Law Journal =

Legal newspaper

- Type: Daily Legal newspaper
- Owner: ALM
- Founded: 1888
- Language: English
- Headquarters: New York City
- ISSN: 0028-7326
- Website: newyorklawjournal.com

The New York Law Journal, founded in 1888, is a legal periodical covering the legal profession in the U.S. state of New York.

== Background ==
The newspaper, published Monday through Friday, provides daily coverage of civil and criminal cases from state and federal courts, as well as news about court administration, large and small law firms, elected officials, government offices, law schools, nonprofit agencies, in-house legal departments, and bar associations. It provides analysis and insight in columns written by leading professionals and serves as the official publication for the First and Second Judicial Departments. The newspaper publishes a number of special issues, including its "NYLJ 100" rankings of New York's 100 largest law firms.

The Law Journal is published by ALM.

The Law Journal is published Monday through Friday, except on February 20 in honor of President's Day. With a circulation of 11,450, which it says makes it the highest circulation legal daily newspaper in the United States. As of 1989, when it had 85,000 readers, the $239,630 average annual household income of readers was the highest of any daily newspaper in the country. The paper's website has 3,500 paid subscribers.

Its primary audience is litigators. Because the full decisions of many New York City court cases, particularly the New York City Civil Court, are reported only in the Law Journal, it is common for lawyers practicing in these courts to cite to the newspaper for case law authority. The Law Journal is also one of the accepted newspapers regularly used to serve process by publication of legal notices.

The full text of most Law Journal articles on its website is available to subscribers only; however, a selection of articles from NYLJ and other ALM properties is available for free on ALM's New York Law Journal website.

The newspaper began publishing personal advertisements in October 1989.
