= ALM (company) =

Integrated media company located in New York City

- Industry: Media, Legal News
- Founded: 1979; 47 years ago
- Founder: Steven Brill
- Headquarters: Socony-Mobil Building, 150 East 42nd Street,, New York City, U.S.
- Key people: Nick Brailey (CEO)
- Products: The American Lawyer; Law.com; Law.com International; Corporate Counsel; The Legal Intelligencer; The National Law Journal; New York Law Journal; Law Journal Press; Litigation Daily; Legaltech News; The Supreme Court Brief; The Recorder (California); Connecticut Law Tribune; Delaware Law Weekly; Texas Lawyer; New Jersey Law Journal; LegalWeek annual conference
- Parent: Time Warner (1997–1998); Wasserstein & Co (1998–2007, 2014–); Incisive Media (2007–2009); Apax Partners (2009–2014); Eagletree Capital (2014-Present)
- Website: www.alm.com

ALM (formerly American Lawyer Media) is a media company headquartered in the Socony-Mobil Building in Manhattan, and is a provider of specialized business news and information, focused on law.

ALM owns and publishes national, regional, and international magazines and newspapers, including The American Lawyer, the New York Law Journal, Corporate Counsel, The National Law Journal, The Legal Intelligencer, Legal Times, Law.com, and Law.com International.

The company also produces conferences and trade shows for business leaders and the legal profession. Law Journal Press, ALM's professional book imprint, publishes over 130 treatises on a broad range of legal topics. Other ALM businesses include newsletter publishing, court verdict and settlement reporting, production of professional educational seminars, market research, and content distribution.

== History ==
The company was started in 1979 by Steven Brill to publish The American Lawyer.

In February 1997, Brill sold ALM to Time Warner, mainly for its CourtTV stake.

In July 1997, ALM's legal publications were acquired from Time Warner by U.S. Equity Partners, L.P., a private equity fund sponsored by Bruce Wasserstein.

In October 1997, it acquired National Law Publishing Company (parent of The National Law Journal and New York Law Journal) from Boston Ventures and the legal publications of Legal Communications (including The Legal Intelligencer) from Meridian Venture Partners.

In 2007, ALM was purchased by Incisive Media for US$630 million. Two years later, Incisive had to restructure the loan used to purchase ALM, and ALM once again became an independent company, owned by the lenders and Apax Partners.

Wasserstein & Co. repurchased ALM in 2014.

In 2015, ALM acquired Summit Professional Networks.

In January 2016, ALM acquired British legal magazine Legal Week.

In March 2025, ALM merged with Law Business Research (LBR).

In May 2025, ALM completed the corporate spin-off of Touchpoint Markets, which owns ThinkAdvisor, BenefitsPRO, PropertyCasualty360, GlobeSt, and Credit Union Times. In July 2025, Arc Networks, owned by EagleTree Capital, acquired TouchPoint Markets.

== Publications ==
- The American Lawyer
- The Legal Intelligencer
- The National Law Journal
- New York Law Journal
- Law Journal Press
- Litigation Daily
- Legaltech News
- The Supreme Court Brief
- The Recorder
- Connecticut Law Tribune
- Delaware Law Weekly
- Texas Lawyer
- New Jersey Law Journal
