= Rapture (Peter Mulvey album) =

Studio album by Peter Mulvey
- Released: January 30, 1995
- Recorded: October 30 – 31, 1995
- Genre: Folk
- Length: 43:33
- Label: Black Walnut
- Producer: David "Goody" Goodrich

Peter Mulvey chronology
Rain (1994)	Rapture (1995)	Deep Blue (1997)

Rapture is an album by American singer/songwriter Peter Mulvey, released in 1995.

== Reception ==
Professional ratings
Review scores
Source	Rating
Allmusic	2.5/5 stars

Writing for Allmusic, critic Darryl Cator wrote of the album, "Mulvey is a talented performer, reaching with all his strength for greatness. Because he hasn't grasped it yet, he appears to be overreaching, but it can be pretty entertaining watching him try."

== Track listing ==
All songs by Peter Mulvey.

1. "Rapture" – 4:42
2. "On the Way Up" – 3:40
3. "Question Mark" – 3:29
4. "Smell the Future" – 3:26
5. "The Voice" – 1:00
6. "So Much More" – 3:11
7. "If Love Is Not Enough" – 4:40
8. "The Whole of the Moon" – 5:00
9. "Half the Time" – 3:33
10. "Black Rabbit" – 3:02
11. "Dog Talk" – 1:11
12. "The Dreams" – 2:42
13. "Whole of the Moon" – 3:57
14. "Aurora Boreallis" – 9:23

== Personnel ==
- Peter Mulvey – vocals, guitar
- David "Goody" Goodrich – guitar, mandolin, dobro, lap steel guitar
- Pamela Means – vocals
- Jennifer Kimball – vocals
- Amy Hartman – vocals

== Production notes ==
- Rob Swalley – engineer, photography
- Ducky Carlisle – engineer, mixing
- Amy Ruppel – design
- Jonathan Wyner – mastering
- Henk Kooistra – mastering
- Phil Antoniades – artwork
- Chris McCue – photography
