= The Knuckleball Suite =

Studio album by Peter Mulvey
- Released: April 18, 2006
- Genre: Folk rock
- Length: 42:48
- Label: Signature Sounds
- Producer: David Goodrich

Peter Mulvey chronology
Kitchen Radio (2004)	The Knuckleball Suite (2006)	Notes from Elsewhere (2007)

The Knuckleball Suite is the seventh album by American singer/songwriter Peter Mulvey. Produced in 2006 by David Goodrich and released by Signature Sounds, it contains a cover of the U2 song "The Fly".

== Reception ==
Professional ratings
Review scores
Source	Rating
Allmusic	4/5 stars

Allmusic wrote of the album "his eclectic musical approach is immediately apparent on this ambitious collection of songs."

== Track listing ==
All songs by Peter Mulvey unless otherwise noted.

1. "Old Simon Stimson" – 2:52
2. "Abilene (The Eisenhower Waltz)" – 3:23
3. "The Fly" (Bono, U2) – 3:58
4. "Girl in the Hi-Tops" – 2:46
5. "You and Me and the Ten Thousand Things" – 3:47
6. "Horses" – 3:11
7. "Thorn" – 3:44
8. "Lila Blue" (Mulvey, David Goodrich, Tim Gearan) – 3:13
9. "Marty and Lou" – 2:!6
10. "Brady Street Stroll" (Mulvey, Paul Cebar) – 3:34
11. "The Knuckleball Suite" – 3:42
12. "The Fix is On" (Mulvey, Goodrich) – 4:51
13. "Coda: Ballymore" – 1:31

== Personnel ==
- Peter Mulvey – vocals, acoustic guitar
- Kris Delmhorst – fiddle, vocals
- David "Goody" Goodrich – banjo, guitar
- Mike Piehl – drums
- Sean Staples – banjo, vocals
- Louise Ulrich – bass

== Production notes ==
- David "Goody" Goodrich – producer, mixing
- Mark Thayer – engineer, mixing
- Ian Kennedy – mastering
- Amy Ruppel – design
