= Law Practice Magazine =

US periodical

- Editor-in-chief: Courtney Ward-Reichard
- Categories: Management, Technology, Marketing
- Frequency: Bimonthly
- Format: Digital-only
- Total circulation: 19,000 (1975)
- First issue: 1974; 52 years ago
- Company: American Bar Association
- Country: United States
- Based in: Chicago
- Language: English
- Website: americanbar.org
- ISSN: 1045-9081 (print); 1949-7660 (web)
- OCLC: 60617180

Law Practice Magazine (formerly Law Practice Management) is a legal magazine published six times per year by the American Bar Association (ABA) Law Practice Division. "Law Practice Magazine", subtitled "The Business of Practicing Law" focuses on law practice management, marketing, technology and finance issues. The magazine is based in Chicago, Illinois.

== History ==
Originally, the ABA Economics of Law Practice Section, the predecessor of the ABA Law Practice Division, published Legal Economic News a four-page newsletter, but with an expanding audience, the Section Council determined upon a magazine format titled Legal Economics in November, 1974. Robert P. Wilkins was instrumental in establishing the new Section magazine and served as its first Editor in Chief. Although an attorney by profession, Wilkins published a regional magazine, Sandlapper: The Magazine of South Carolina . Arnold Fisher was Articles Editor and Delmar L. Roberts served as Managing Editor. The first issue of Legal Economics appeared in the Spring of 1975 with a press run of 15,000 even though the membership of the Section was significantly less. The additional copies were utilized to promote membership in the Section. By August, 1977, advertisements in Legal Economics surpassed those in the ABA Law Student Division's Student Lawyer, but trailed those in the ABA Young Lawyers Division's Barrister and the ABA Journal. By August, 1981, however, advertisements in Legal Economics exceeded all but the ABA Journal. The Division magazine is now Law Practice and has been considered one of the leading Division benefits by membership and has contributed to the immense growth of the Division.

According to Ulrich's Periodicals Directory, it has a circulation of 19,000. It is indexed by the following professional indexing services:

- ABI/INFORM (American Business Information)
- Accounting and Tax Index
- Current Law Index
- Family Index
- INSPEC
- Legal Information Management Index
- LegalTrac
- PAIS International (Public Affairs Information Service)
- SoftBase
