= The Trouble with Poets =

Studio album by Peter Mulvey
- Released: 2000
- Genre: Folk
- Length: 40:03
- Label: Signature Sounds
- Producer: David Goodrich

Peter Mulvey chronology
Glencree (1999)	The Trouble with Poets (2000)	Ten Thousand Mornings (2002)

The Trouble with Poets is an album by American singer/songwriter Peter Mulvey, released in 2000.

== Reception ==
Professional ratings
Review scores
Source	Rating
Allmusic	4/5 stars

Writing for Allmusic, critic Evan Cator wrote of the album, "...for all his skill as a guitarist, Mulvey's musical compositions only fitfully match the brilliance of his lyrics. Melody has never been his strongest suit, and he is somewhat limited as a singer. But despite the inconsistencies, it doesn't take a poet to see poetry in The Trouble With Poets."

== Track listing ==
All songs by Peter Mulvey and David Goodrich unless otherwise noted.

1. "The Trouble With Poets" – 3:40
2. "Words Too Small to Say" – 3:57
3. "Check Me Out (Hey Hey Hey)" – 3:47
4. "Every Word Except Goodbye" – 3:49
5. "Wings of the Ragman" – 3:47
6. "You Meet the Nicest People in Your Dreams" (Al Goodhart, Al Hoffman) – 2:06
7. "Eyes Front (See Through You)" – 3:55
8. "All the Way Home" – 3:00
9. "Bright Idea" – 4:43
10. "Tender Blindspot" (Peter Mulvey) – 4:23
11. "Home" – 2:56

== Personnel ==
- Peter Mulvey – vocals, guitar
- David "Goody" Goodrich – guitar, mandolin, bass guitar
- Mike Piehl – drums
- Jennifer Kimball – vocals

== Production notes ==
- David Goodrich – producer
- Joe Panzetta – design
- Amy Ruppel – paintings, illustrations
- Joan Yokum – photography
