= Rain (Peter Mulvey album) =

Live album by Peter Mulvey
- Released: 1994
- Recorded: 1994, The Helfaer Theatre; Milwaukee, Wisconsin
- Genre: Folk
- Length: 35:18

Peter Mulvey chronology
Brother Rabbit Speaks (1992)	Rain (1994)	Rapture (1995)

Rain is the second album by American singer/songwriter Peter Mulvey, released in 1994. It was reissued by Signature Sounds Recordings in 2001.

== Reception ==
Professional ratings
Review scores
Source	Rating
Allmusic	3/5 stars

Writing for AllMusic, critic Evan Cater wrote of the album, "His singing voice still sounds young and somewhat green... there was still plenty of room for growth. Rain is not nearly as polished as Mulvey's mature label-backed efforts. But if Brother Rabbit Speaks is the musical equivalent of an embarrassing high school yearbook photo, Rain is a portrait of the artist as a young man.."

== Track listing ==
All songs by Peter Mulvey.

1. "The Tree" – 3:32
2. "November" – 3:32
3. "Little Foot" – 1:30
4. "Birgit" – 3:10
5. "No Wonder" – 3:17
6. "All in Good Fun" – 3:11
7. "The Prince" – 1:22
8. "No One Else" – 2:17
9. "The Dreams" – 2:10
10. "The Way That I Love You" – 3:36
11. "September Dawn" – 7:41

== Personnel ==
- Peter Mulvey – vocals, guitar
