= Peter Mulvey =

American singer-songwriter

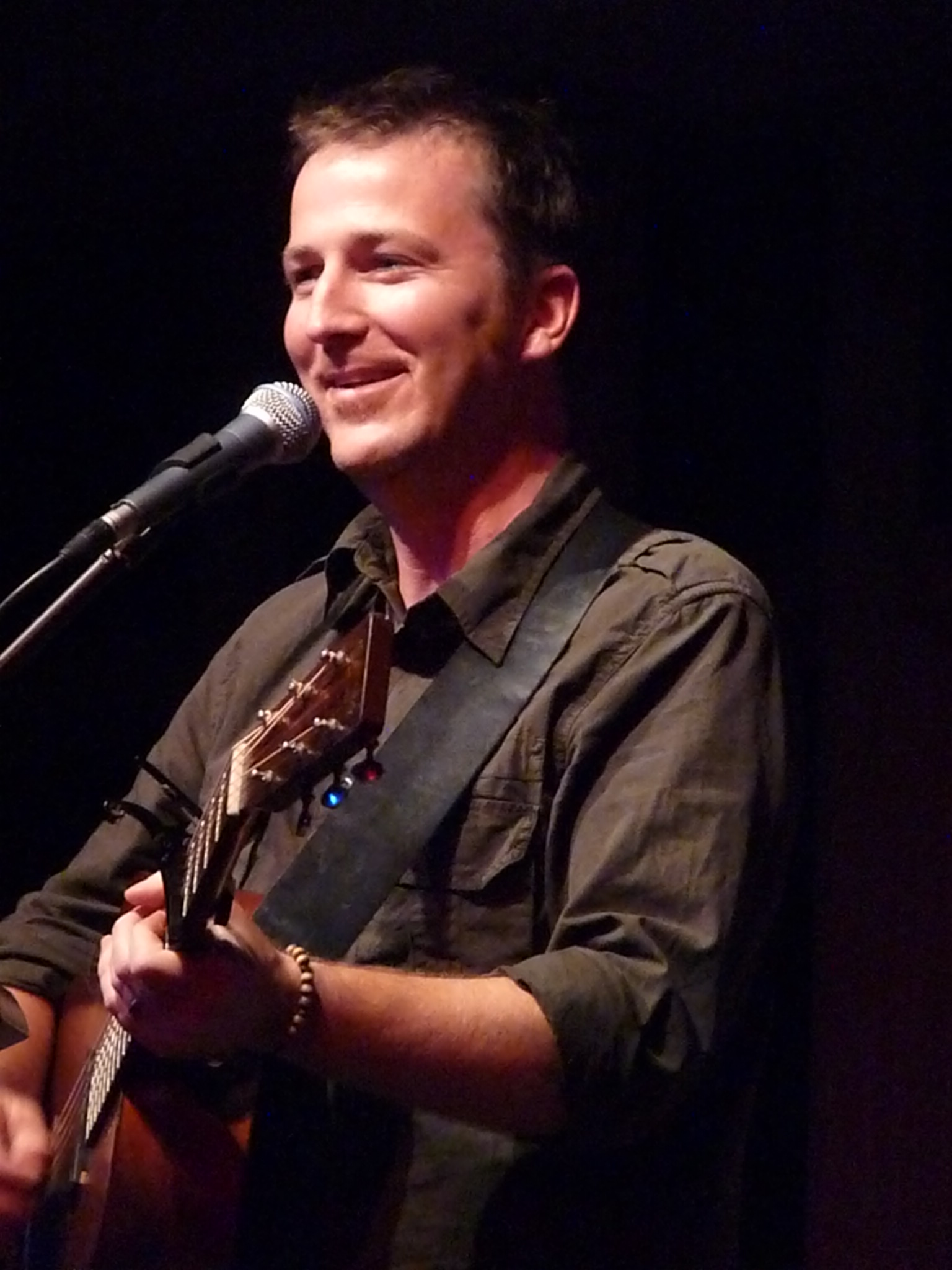

Background information
- Born: September 6, 1969 (age 55); Milwaukee, Wisconsin, U.S.
- Genres: Americana, folk
- Occupation(s): Singer, songwriter
- Instrument: Guitar
- Years active: 1992–present
- Labels: Signature Sounds, Black Walnut, Eastern Front
- Website: www.petermulvey.com

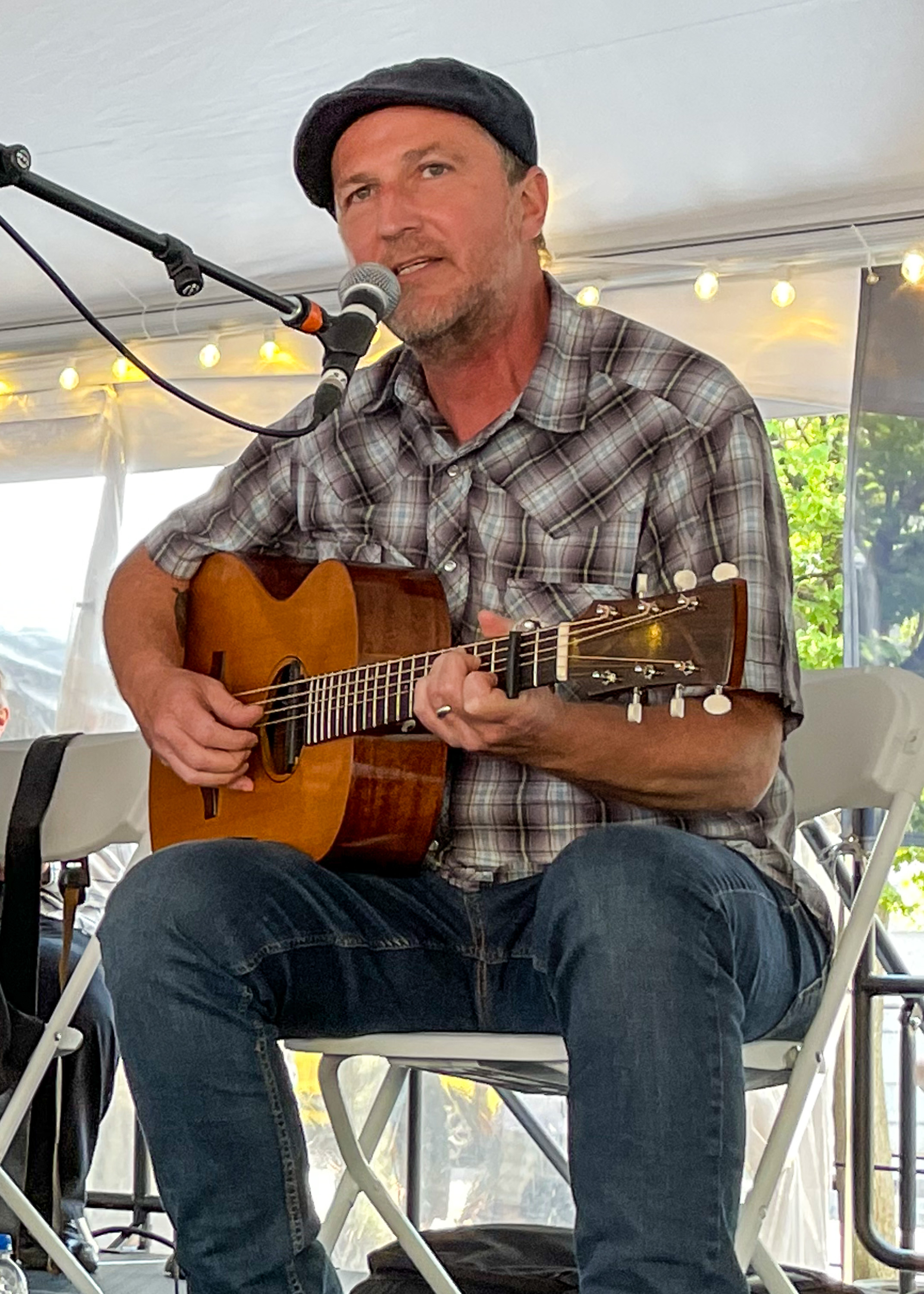
Mulvey at the New Bedford Folk Festival in 2022

Peter Mulvey (born September 6, 1969) is an American folk singer-songwriter based in Milwaukee, Wisconsin. Since the early 1990s, he has developed a strong national following in the indie folk/rock scene through his relentless touring and critically acclaimed albums. Starting his musical career in Milwaukee while at Marquette University, he honed his performing skills while traveling in Dublin, Ireland. He later spent several years in Boston, where he frequently performed in the city's subway system. He is best known for his warmly wry songwriting and his intense percussive guitar style.

== Discography ==
=== Albums ===
- 1992 - Rabbit Talk (self-released demo tape)
- 1992 - Brother Rabbit Speaks (re-issued in 2001)
- 1994 - Rain (re-issued in 2001)
- 1995 - Rapture
- 1997 - Goodbye Bob (EP)
- 1997 - Deep Blue
- 1998 - Glencree (live album)
- 2000 - The Trouble with Poets
- 2002 - Ten Thousand Mornings (cover album recorded entirely in the Davis Square T Station)
- 2004 - Kitchen Radio
- 2005 - Redbird (with Kris Delmhorst, Jeffrey Foucault and David Goodrich)
- 2006 - The Knuckleball Suite
- 2007 - Notes from Elsewhere (acoustic retrospective album)
- 2009 - Letters from a Flying Machine
- 2009 - The Bicycle (limited edition Tour EP)
- 2010 - Redbird: Live at the Cafe Carpe (with Kris Delmhorst, Jeffrey Foucault, David Goodrich)
- 2011 - Nine Days Wonder (instrumental album with David Goodrich)
- 2012 - The Good Stuff
- 2012 - Chaser (EP, companion to The Good Stuff)
- 2014 - Silver Ladder
- 2017 - Are You Listening?
- 2018 - There Is Another World
- 2020 - Live at the Cafe Carpe (with SistaStrings)
- 2022 - Love Is the Only Thing (& SistaStrings) [named after the title song by Chuck Prophet and klipschutz]

=== Singles ===
- 2018 - The Fox
- 2018 - Fool's Errand
- 2022 - Who's Gonna Love You Now?
- 2020 - Don't You Ever Change (with SistaStrings)
- 2020 - You Are The Only One (with SistaStrings)
- 2020 - What Else Was It? (with SistaStrings)
- 2021 - Take Down Your Flag (with SistaStrings)
- 2021 - Asshole in Space
- 2022 - You and (Everybody Else) (with SistaStrings)

=== Compilations ===
- 1994 - "Acoustic Alliance: Vol. 1"
- 1995 - "Acoustic Alliance Vol. 2"
- 1998 - WXRV Presents: Live From River Music Hall, Vol. 1
- 2000 - Main Stage Live (Falcon Ridge Folk Festival)
- 2002 - WORDS: A Wisconsin Songwriter Compilation
- 2002 - Wonderland: A Winter Solstice Celebration
- 2004 - Signature Sounds 10th Anniversary Collection CD
- 2004 - Paste Magazine Sampler #4

=== DVDs ===
- 2004 - On The Way
- 2004 - Signature Sounds 10th Anniversary Collection DVD
