= Steven Brill (journalist) =

American lawyer, journalist, and entrepreneur

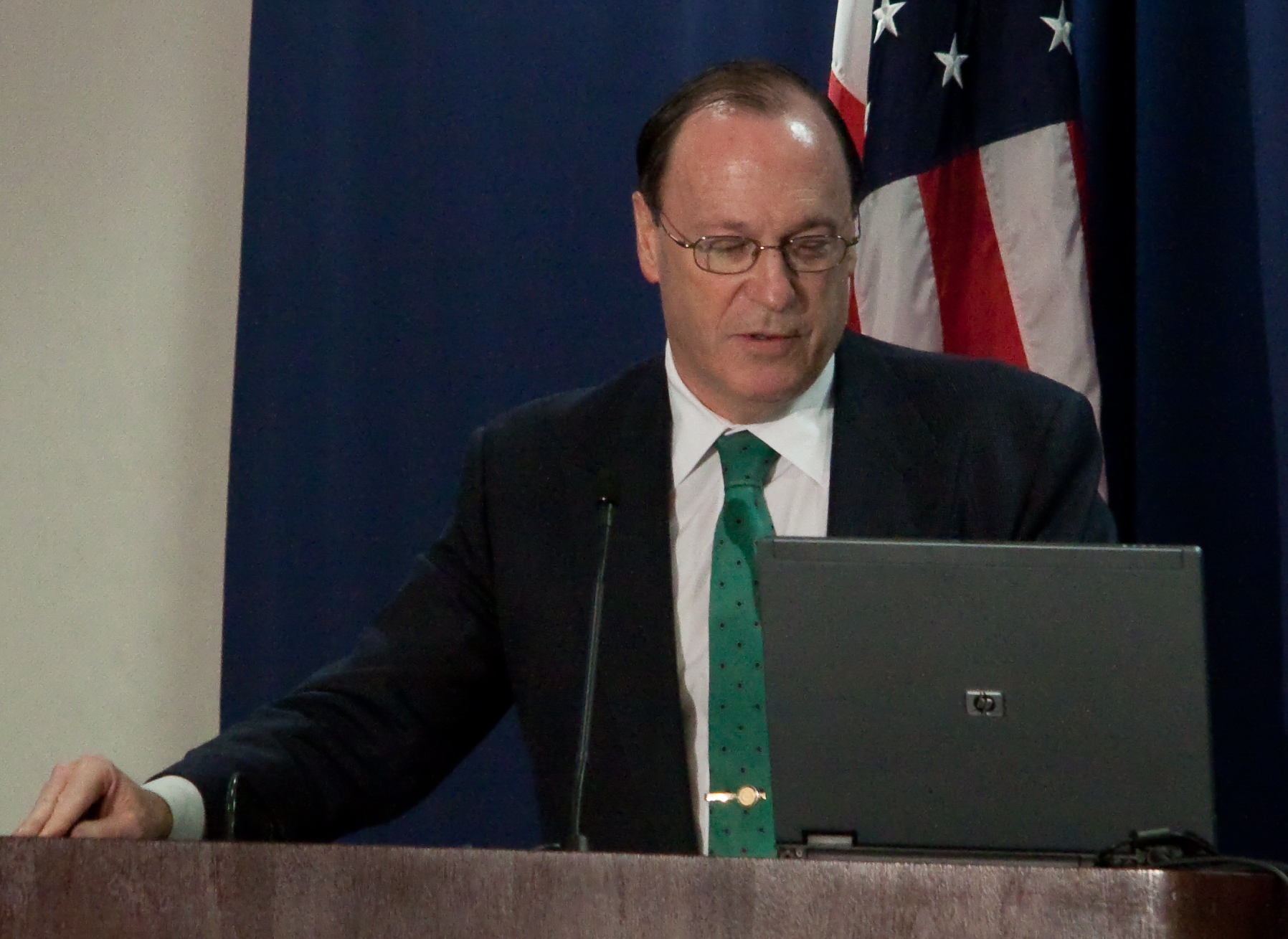
- Brill in 2009
- Born: August 22, 1950 (age 76); New York City, US
- Education: Yale University (BA, JD)
- Occupations: Journalist, author, media entrepreneur
- Known for: Court TV, The American Lawyer magazine

Steven Brill (born August 22, 1950) is an American lawyer, journalist, and entrepreneur who founded monthly magazine The American Lawyer and cable channel Court TV. He is the author of the best-selling book, Tailspin: The People and Forces Behind America's Fifty-Year Fall – and Those Fighting to Reverse It.

== Early life and education ==
Brill was born to a Jewish family in Far Rockaway, Queens, New York. He is a graduated from Deerfield Academy and earned a B.A. from Yale College in 1972 and a J.D. from Yale Law School in 1975.

== Projects ==
In October 1978 his first book, The Teamsters, about the International Brotherhood of Teamsters trade union, was published by Simon & Schuster. Brill described the book as "less than 10 percent about Hoffa" and stated that "in some respects, it's a very positive story about the teamsters. In fact, I've had an offer to go to work for the teamsters as a public‐relations consultant—which I turned down".

In 1979, Brill launched The American Lawyer, a monthly magazine covering the business of law firms and lawyers in the United States and around the world. Jill Abramson and Jim Cramer were among its early contributors. The magazine is noted for its surveys, including the "Am Law 100", an annual ranking of the top 100 U.S. law firms, which it launched in 1986. The magazine covered the meteoric rise and precipitous collapse of the law firm of Finley, Kumble, Wagner, Underberg, Manley, Myerson & Casey, in its September 1987 cover story, "Bye, Bye, Finley, Kumble", written by Brill.

In 1989, Brill founded Court TV (now TruTV), launching the network on July 1, 1991. Among its original anchors were Fred Graham, who was still at the network twenty years later; Cynthia McFadden; and Terry Moran, who later joined ABC News. The network was born out of two competing projects to launch cable channels with live courtroom proceedings, the American Trial Network from TimeWarner and American Lawyer Media and In Court from Cablevision and NBC. Both projects were combined and presented at the National Cable Television Association, in June 1990. Liberty Media joined the venture, in 1991. Court TV featured continuous live trial coverage, with analysis by anchors. The network's profile was raised during the Menendez brothers' first trial and, later, the O. J. Simpson murder trial. In 1997, Brill resigned from Court TV.

In June 1998, Brill launched Brill's Content, a media watchdog publication. The magazine caused a stir in its very first issue, with Brill's article titled "Pressgate" charging that independent counsel Ken Starr and his office had been the source of much of the information for reporters regarding the grand jury proceedings about the Lewinsky scandal and that as a result, Starr may have violated federal law or ethical and prosecutorial guidelines. The publication became less associated with Brill after its founding.

In July 2000, Brill launched Contentville, a site that sold books, magazine articles, and other content. In January 2001, as part of a joint venture, Brill took over editorial control of trade publications that reported on the media industry owned by Primedia (now Rent Group). Contentville closed in September 2001. and Brill's Content suspended publication in October 2001, after dissolving its partnership with Primedia.

In 2001 Brill began teaching an advanced journalism course at Yale.

In November 2001 Brill signed on as a contributing editor for Newsweek.

In April 2003, After: How America Confronted the September 12 Era was published. In October 2003, the America Prepared Campaign was launched. In the fall of 2003, Brill founded the company Clear, a subsidiary of Verified Identity Pass, Inc. It allowed travelers to get through airport security quickly with an annual subscription to the program and pre-screening. Brill left the company in March 2009; it went out of business at 11 p.m. PDT on June 22, 2009.

In 2009, Brill, former Wall Street Journal executive Gordon Crovitz, and ex-cable television industry mogul Leo Hindery founded Journalism Online to help newspapers and magazines charge for online access. The company was sold to RR Donnelley for a reported $45 million in March 2011. However, Donnelley's subsequent 10-K filing reported the price at closing was $19.6 million with the possibility of an additional payment to co-CEOs Brill and Crovitz (who both stayed with the company after the sale to Donnelley) of $15.3 million contingent upon meeting certain sales targets. As of March 2013, more than 400 newspapers, magazines and online-only websites used JO's Press+ service to charge for digital content.

In August 2011, Brill published Class Warfare: Inside the Fight to Fix America's Schools. It described the success of charter schools, using the Success Academy Charter Schools (then known as Harlem Success Academy) as an example, and profiled teacher Jessica Reid as a model of what could be done without union restrictions. He claimed that unions, particularly the United Federation of Teachers and UFT president Randi Weingarten in New York City, protected incompetent teachers, and were opposed to pay-for-performance, and obstructed necessary reforms, a claim he had previously made in The New Yorker. By the time Brill came to the end of the book, Reid had quit. The long hours and stress of her job, with nightly calls to parents, and constant prodding of students, were affecting her marriage. Brill went on to write that charters, which he continued to support, were not practically scalable to be a replacement for the current public education system, and that broader improvements would require the efforts of current public school teachers and their unions. He said that after two years of researching school reform, he had a better understanding of the complexities. He reversed his view of Weingarten, and proposed that New York City Mayor Michael Bloomberg appoint her chancellor of the school system.

In February 2013, Brill wrote Bitter Pill: Why Medical Bills Are Killing Us as a Time magazine cover story. The investigation of billing practices revealed that hospitals and their executives are gaming the system to maximize revenue. Brill claims patients receive bills that have little relationship to the care provided and that the free market in American medicine is a myth, with or without Obamacare (aka PPACA/ACA) . The 24,000-plus word article took up the entire feature section of the magazine, the first time in its history. TIME's managing editor, Rick Stengel, wrote:

If the piece has a villain, it's something you've probably never heard of: the chargemaster, the mysterious internal price list for products and services that every hospital in the U.S. keeps. If the piece has a hero, it's an unlikely one: Medicare, the government program that by law can pay hospitals only the approximate costs of care.

Brill later expanded the article into a book, America's Bitter Pill: Money, Politics, Backroom Deals, and the Fight to Fix Our Broken Healthcare System, released January 5, 2015, that attained The New York Times Best Seller list.

On September 15, 2015, The Huffington Post Highline published Brill's 15-part serial documentary, "America's Most Admired Law Breaker," examining Johnson & Johnson's 20-year practice of illegally marketing a powerful drug, Risperdal, to children and the elderly, while concealing the side effects and earning billions of dollars in profit.

In March 2018, Brill and fellow veteran journalist and entrepreneur, Gordon Crovitz, again partnered to form a new for-profit company, NewsGuard, which claims to fight fake news by providing reliability ratings for over 7,500 U.S. websites to help online readers distinguish between legitimate news sources and those allegedly designed to spread misinformation. NewsGuard was launched on August 23, 2018.

Brill's 2018 book, Tailspin: The People and Forces Behind America's Fifty-Year Fall – and Those Fighting to Reverse It (May 2018, Knopf), details America's decline across a broad range of areas, including government, finance, education, infrastructure, and public health, and introduces us to those who are working to repair the damage. Tailspin was included on The New York Times Best Seller list six days after its release, and regarding which renowned Washington Post journalist Bob Woodward wrote:

A penetrating and personal examination of why the United States is in the midst of a nervous breakdown. But with his fantastically reported story, Brill also shows how—and who—might restore some common sense and equilibrium.

After the release of the NY Post Hunter Biden story, Steven Brill said on CNBC, "My personal opinion is there’s a high likelihood this story is a hoax, maybe even a hoax perpetrated by the Russians again".

== Personal life ==
Brill is married and has three children. He resides in New York City and Bedford, New York.

== Bibliography ==
- Brill, Steven (1977). Firearm Abuse : A research and policy report. Washington, D.C.: Police Foundation. LCCN 76051921.
- Brill, Steven (1978). The Teamsters. New York: Simon & Schuster. ISBN 0-671-22771-8. LCCN 78016610.
- Brill, Steven; editors and reporters of the American Lawyer (1989). Trial by Jury. New York: Simon & Schuster. ISBN 0-671-67132-4. LCCN 89026309.
- Brill, Steven (2003). After : How America confronted the September 12 era. New York: Simon & Schuster. ISBN 0-7432-3709-9. LCCN 2003042727.
- Brill, Steven (2011). Class Warfare : Inside the fight to fix America's schools. New York: Simon & Schuster. ISBN 978-1-4516-1199-1. LCCN 2011016196.
- Brill, Steven (2015). America's Bitter Pill: Money, Politics, Back-Room Deals, and the Fight to Fix Our Broken Healthcare System. New York: Random House. ISBN 978-0812996951. OCLC 884298042.
- Brill, Steven (2018). Tailspin: The People and Forces Behind America's Fifty-Year Fall—and Those Fighting to Reverse It. New York: Knopf Publishers. ISBN 9780525432012. OCLC 1046068326.
- Brill, Steven (2024). The Death of Truth: How Social Media and the Internet Gave Snake Oil Salesmen and Demagogues the Weapons to Destroy Trust and Polarize the World--and What We Can Do About It. New York: Knopf Publishers. ISBN 9780525658313. OCLC 1419684518.
