= New Media Age =

British weekly news magazine

- Frequency: Weekly
- First issue: May 1995
- Final issue: 2011
- Company: Centaur Media
- Country: United Kingdom
- Language: English
- Website: econsultancy.com/nma-archive
- ISSN: 1364-7776

New Media Age (NMA) was a weekly news magazine, covering business is use of interactive media in the UK is now Econsultancy.

New Media Age is owned by Centaur Media plc. It was launched as a newsletter in May 1995 under editor Phil Dwyer with reporters Nick Jones and Catherine Stewart. They worked together in Centaur's newsletter's division and conceived the idea in 1994 Once considered title for the publication was InfoBahn. They were joined by freelancer Julianna Koranteng. They were joined by Mike Butcher in 1996, who subsequently became Deputy Editor under Dwyer. In 1998, Mike Butcher took over as editor, when Dwyer, Jones and Stewart left to start the European operation of Jupiter Research. Later that year, the title moved to a magazine format. Butcher resigned in 2000 to join The Industry Standard Europe. He was replaced by Michael Nutley in 2000. In 2007, Nutley became editor-in-chief, and Justin Pearse was promoted from deputy editor to editor. The current news editor is Will Cooper and the features editor is Anna Richardson. The publisher was Andy Oakes.

The magazine was aimed at people within UK companies using interactive media to communicate with their customers, and at the companies providing the products and services that make this communication possible. It was available by subscription or from selected newsagents. An annual subscription cost in the region of £99.

New Media Age maintained a website carrying breaking news that was available free. It also housed the content of the latest issue and the magazine's archive, but these elements were open to subscribers only. In 2012 this site was archived at Econsultancy.com, but has since been removed.

Since 2000, the magazine produced an annual list of the top 100 marketing and advertising agencies specializing in interactive media. In 2006 it added a companion guide to companies providing marketing services in the interactive sector. Since 2012, the Top 100 report has been produced by Econsultancy

New Media Age also ran the NMA Effectiveness Awards, which were launched in 1997. The magazine also ran the Online Marketing Show in conjunction with its sister title, Marketing Week. in 2011, the NMA awards were combined with Econsultancy's Innovation Awards to create 'The Digitals'

In 2009, New Media Age launched Reputation Online, a blog devoted digital PR. The blog shut down in June 2011 after a restructuring by parent company Centaur Media plc.

In 2011, New Media Age closed its magazine, becoming a digital-only operation. In 2012, Centaur Media announced that the New Media Age website would be merged into Econsultancy.

Econsultancy.com hosts all archive NMA content.

Andy Oakes and Justin Pearse combined again to set up New Digital Age in 2018, part of the Bluestripe Group
