= Letters from a Flying Machine =

Studio album by Peter Mulvey
- Released: August 11, 2009
- Recorded: January – April 2009
- Genre: Indie, folk
- Length: 44:56
- Label: Signature Sounds
- Producer: Dave Chalfant, Peter Mulvey

Peter Mulvey chronology
Notes from Elsewhere (2007)	Letters from a Flying Machine (2009)	The Good Stuff (2012)

Letters from a Flying Machine is an album by American singer-songwriter Peter Mulvey, released in 2009. Letters from a Flying Machine is a collection of new songs and spoken-word "letters" by Mulvey, the letters written while in flight to his nieces and nephews.

== Reception ==
Professional ratings
Review scores
Source	Rating
AllMusic	4/5 stars

AllMusic's review of the album wrote of the spoken word sections "Most are painful to listen to, lacking the grace and lighthearted humor that mark his songwriting," but wrote the songs "aren't as heavy-handed, even when they take on weighty subjects."

== Track listing ==
All tracks by Peter Mulvey unless noted.

1. "Kids in the Square" (Peter Mulvey, Tim Gearan) – 3:43
2. "Some People" – 3:17
3. "Letter from a Flying Machine" [spoken] – 3:02
4. "Windshield" – 3:42
5. "What's Keeping Erica?" (Mulvey, Paul Cebar) – 3:08
6. ". . . Plus the Many Inevitable Fragments" [spoken] – 2:40
7. "Dynamite Bill" (Mulvey, Gearan) – 3:21
8. "Shoulderbirds (You Know Me)" (Mulvey, Gearan) – 3:37
9. "Bears" (spoken) – 3:54
10. "Mailman" – 3:15
11. "Vlad the Astrophysicist" [spoken] – 5:40
12. "On a Wing and a Prayer" (Mulvey, Tim Fagan) – 3:42
13. "Love Is Here to Stay" (George Gershwin, Ira Gershwin) – 1:55

== Personnel ==
- Peter Mulvey – acoustic guitar, vocals, bells
- Kris Delmhorst – vocals
- David "Goody" Goodrich – guitar, slide guitar
- Chris Wagoner – mandolin, violin, viola
- Randy Sabien – violin
- Mary Gaines – cello
- Steve Yarbro – clarinet
- Nathan Kilen – percussion

== Production notes ==
- Produced by Dave Chalfant and Peter Mulvey
- Engineered by Ric Probst and Al Williams
- Mixed by David Chalfant
- Mastered by Ian Kennedy
- Art and design by Peter Nevins
