= Better Farming (Canada) =

Better Farming is a monthly magazine focusing on the business of farming in Ontario. As of 2016 it was the largest-circulation periodical serving Ontario's commercial farmers.

Better Farming was founded in 1999 in Toronto and is owned by Ag Media. Paul Nolan is the publisher of the magazine which is a general circulation magazine, and is also delivered as a benefit to all members of the Ontario Federation of Agriculture (OFA).

Better Farming also launched a Prairies version of the magazine, to bring its editorial content to farmers in Manitoba, Saskatchewan and Alberta.
