= U.S. Pharmacist =

American magazine

August 2005 issue

The U.S. Pharmacist ISSN 0147-7633 is a monthly magazine for pharmacists and health professionals. It is published by Jobson Publishing. In 2018 the company was acquired by WebMD. The magazine is based in Riverton, New Jersey. As of 2013 Harold Cohen was the editor-in-chief of U.S. Pharmacist.
