= Creative Review =

British advertising magazine

- Cover of the Autumn 2024 issue
- Editor: Eliza Williams
- Categories: Magazine
- Frequency: Bimonthly
- Circulation: Global
- Founded: 1981; 45 years ago
- Company: Centaur Media
- Country: United Kingdom
- Based in: London
- Language: English
- Website: www.creativereview.co.uk
- ISSN: 0262-1037

Creative Review is a bimonthly British print magazine and website. The magazine focuses on commercial creativity, covering design, advertising, photography, branding, digital products, film, and gaming. The magazine is published bimonthly in print and also has an online magazine and a podcast.

== History ==
Creative Review was launched in 1981 as a quarterly supplement to Marketing Week, then becoming a stand-alone monthly magazine.

In 2007, it was reported that the magazine had sold guest editorship of its February 2007 edition to an advertising agency, Mother, for £15,000, although then editor Patrick Burgoyne retained overall editorial control.

Creative Review launched a full website in 2009, after running a blog for two years, which Burgoyne had perceived as "successful" but "limiting".

In July 2017, the magazine went bimonthly, with six issues published each year.

As of April 2018, Creative Review launched an online subscription, with a selection of articles only available to paying readers.

== Ownership ==
Creative Review is owned by Centaur Media, and is part of its Xeim marketing and creative division.

== Award schemes ==
From around 1999, Creative Review ran a scheme known as the Creative Futures Bursary Project in 2008, to celebrate "emerging talent in visual communications". In that year, Kate Moross was selected as a winner of the bursary. (Note: Later known as Aries Moross.)

As of 2019 Creative Review runs two award schemes: The Annual, which recognises the best in commercial creativity; and The Photography Annual, which celebrates the best photography work of the year.
