= Centaur Media =

British company

- Type: Public
- Traded as: LSE: CAU
- Industry: Business Media
- Founded: 1981
- Headquarters: London, United Kingdom
- Key people: Swag Mukerji (CEO); Graham Sherren (founder)
- Number of employees: 260 (2019)
- Website: centaurmedia.com

Centaur Media (LSE: CAU) was a London-based business information, events and marketing provider to professional and commercial markets. It currently operates through two segments: Xeim (marketing and communications), and The Lawyer. It was formed in 1981 by Graham Sherren, and was incorporated as a public limited company. It has ceased to trade, has cancelled most of its shares and has been going through the final stages of winding down operations during 2026.

== Recent history ==
Centaur Media was traditionally associated with B2B print magazines such as Marketing Week, The Engineer and The Lawyer on a controlled circulation model. In the words of previous CEO Geoff Wilmot: "We're publishing the titles on behalf of the advertisers but maintaining editorial integrity. Our revenues came from display advertising, classified adverts and recruitment."

In 2011, Wilmot, who became CEO from 2006, described Centaur Media as a company in a process of change, both structurally and in relation to the emergence of digital media. “We used to describe ourselves as a federation of small businesses. Somebody once said: 'It's more like an archipelago of businesses with a lot of water in between.'" In this period, Centaur Media embarked on a restructuring programme after the recession, with investment in its exhibition and information arms.

Wilmot left Centaur in June 2013 along with the managing director of the business publishing division, Tim Potter, with Wilmot shelving a bid to take over the business in October 2013.

== Andria Vidler becomes CEO ==
This transition in Centaur Media continued after the appointment of Andria Vidler as CEO in November 2013. According to an article in The Guardian from August 2014, Vidler inherited a pre-tax loss of £37.4 million in the year to the end of June 2013 and, by year end, debt had grown to £27 million.

Under her leadership, Centaur embarked on a strategy of becoming what Vidler termed a "B2B business information" group, moving away from “a reliance on tactical trade advertising”. This has meant a greater emphasis on information-led digital subscription products.

By 2017, Centaur Media's revenue mix was: marketing services 8%; events 42%; digital premium content 24%; digital advertising 14%; and print 10%. In 2014, digital advertising and print had accounted for 15% and 24%, respectively.

Vidler oversaw a disposal process in 2018-19 that saw Centaur Media divest its financial services division, Centaur Human Resources and engineering portfolio, raising more than £20 million.

In September 2019, Centaur Media announced that Vidler was stepping down as CEO, with former CFO Swag Mukerji succeeding her.

The company's senior executive management comprises: Swag Mukerji (CEO); Linda Smith (Chief Operating Officer); Howard Chapman (interim CFO); Steve Newbold (Divisional Managing Director, Marcomms Division); Suki Thompson (CEO and Founding Partner of Oystercatchers); and Andy Baker (Divisional Managing Director, Legal Division).

Centaur Media shifted its location from Fitzrovia to London's South Bank in December 2019.

== Xeim: Centaur Media marketing and creative brands ==
- Creative Review
- Econsultancy
- Fashion and Beauty Monitor
- Festival of Marketing
- Foresight News
- Influencer Intelligence
- Marketing Week
- Oystercatchers
- Really B2B
- Year Ahead

== Recent acquisitions, disinvestments and rebrands ==
=== MarketMakers ===
In July 2017, Centaur Media announced the acquisition of MarketMakers, a UK B2B marketing services business, for £13.4 million. However, in July 2020, as a result of the COVID-19 pandemic, Centaur announced it was to close the MarketMakers business, with only its sister company, Really B2B, retained.

=== Home Interest division ===
In July 2017, Centaur Media sold its Home Interest portfolio to Future plc for £32 million, including Homebuilding & Renovating, Period Living and Real Homes.

=== Oystercatchers ===
On 21 September 2016, Centaur Media acquired brand consultancy company Oystercatchers for £3.35 million.

=== Xeim ===
On 22 January 2019, Centaur Media announced that it had brought its various marketing business under the name Xeim (derived from the term 'Excellence in marketing'), including Creative Review, Design Week, Econsultancy, Marketing Week and Oystercatchers.

=== Financial services division ===
On 1 April 2019, Centaur Media announced that it had sold its financial services division, including Money Marketing, Mortgage Strategy, Platforum, Taxbriefs and Headline Money, to Metropolis Group for £5 million cash.

=== Centaur Media Travel and Meetings Limited ===
On 10 April 2019, Centaur Media announced that it had agreed the sale of Centaur Media Travel and Meetings Limited, owner of the Business Travel Show and The Meetings Show, to Northstar Travel Media UK Limited for £9.25 million. The sale was expected to be completed by 30 April 2019.

=== Centaur Human Resources Limited ===
On 16 April 2019, it was reported that Centaur Media had agreed the sale of Centaur Human Resources, which includes Employee Benefits, Employee Benefits Live, Employee Benefits Connect and Forum For Expatriate Management, to DVV Media International for a £5 million cash consideration. Completion of the disposal was expected to take place on 30 April 2019.

=== Festival of Marketing expands ===
On 1 May 2019, Xeim, Centaur Media's marketing division, announced that its annual Festival of Marketing would henceforth incorporate two previously standalone events, Marketing Week Live and The Insight Show. Festival of Marketing evolved to become a digital event in 2020, as a response to the COVID-19 pandemic.

=== Engineering portfolio ===
On 9 May 2019, Centaur Media entered into a conditional agreement to sell its engineering portfolio, including The Engineer and the Subcon show, to Mark Allen Group for a £2.5 million cash consideration. The transaction was expected to complete by 31 May 2019.
