= Deep Blue (Peter Mulvey album) =

Studio album by Peter Mulvey
- Released: May 20, 1997
- Genre: Folk
- Length: 44:07
- Label: Black Walnut
- Producer: Nick Sansano

Peter Mulvey chronology
Rapture (1995)	Deep Blue (1997)	Glencree (1999)

Deep Blue is an album by American singer/songwriter Peter Mulvey, released in 1997.

== Reception ==
Professional ratings
Review scores
Source	Rating
Allmusic	3/5 stars

Writing for Allmusic, critic Darryl Cator wrote of the album, "Mulvey's songwriting is still in the developing stages. While his lyrics attempt cleverness and depth, they often achieve only earnestness. The melodies become somewhat monotonous by the album's end... But there are moments where these songs achieve inspiring bursts of transcendence, painting vast aural landscapes which perfectly decorate Mulvey's emotional imagery."

== Track listing ==
All songs by Peter Mulvey unless otherwise noted.

1. "Grace" – 4:08
2. "Smoke" – 4:29
3. "Midwife" – 4:45
4. "Take This" – 3:37
5. "No Sense of Humor" – 3:38
6. "Deep Blue" – 4:47
7. "Every Mother's Son" (Chris Smither) – 4:37
8. "Birgit" – 3:22
9. "Out Here" – 4:06
10. "Clap Hands" (Tom Waits) – 4:08
11. "Forever Night Shade Mary" – 2:30 (David Hidalgo, Louis Perez)

== Personnel ==
- Peter Mulvey – vocals, guitar
- David "Goody" Goodrich – guitar, mandolin, keyboards, National Steel Guitar
- Kris Delmhorst – cello
- Mike Piehl – drums
- Tony Levin – bass
- Jackson Cannon – upright bass

== Production notes ==
- Nick Sansano – producer, engineer, mixing
- Sarah Beth Wiley – design, photography
- Tom Coyne – mastering
