= Brother Rabbit Speaks =

Studio album by Peter Mulvey
- Released: 1992
- Genre: Folk
- Length: 48:55
- Producer: Peter Mulvey, Rick Bauer

Peter Mulvey chronology
Brother Rabbit Speaks (1992)	Rain (1994)

Brother Rabbit Speaks is the debut album by American singer/songwriter Peter Mulvey, released in 1992. It was reissued in 2001 by Signature Sounds.

== Reception ==
Professional ratings
Review scores
Source	Rating
Allmusic	1.5/5 stars

Writing for Allmusic, critic Evan Cator praised Mulvey's guitar playing, but criticized his songwriting, writing, "the songs are generally ramblingly wordy lyrics slung haphazardly into semi-melodies that get lost in the intricate guitar work. At times one gets the impression that Mulvey was attempting some sort of jazz-folk hybrid, but he seems to have appropriated only the most self-indulgent and careless qualities of jazz. It doesn't help that he didn't yet have much control over his singing voice... The album will only be of interest to the artist's most devoted followers."

== Track listing ==
All songs by Peter Mulvey.

1. "The Tree" – 4:45
2. "Rain Dog" – 3:59
3. "Black Rabbit" – 3:22
4. "Train Bound for Evermore" – 6:14
5. "The Moon of the Geese Losing Their Feathers" – 4:26
6. "Midwife" – 4:10
7. "The Weremoose" – 3:48
8. "Juda" – 6:01
9. "Rain Song" – 3:15
10. "Imamu" – 3:41
11. "The Voice" – 1:07
12. "September Dawn" – 4:07

== Personnel ==
- Peter Mulvey – vocals, guitar, flute, drums, bass
- Rick Bauer – accordion
- Mary Gaines – cello
- Charles Schulz – bass
- Pamela Means – guitar, vocals
- Frank Mulvey – percussion
- Scott Thom – percussion
