= Silver Ladder =

Studio album by Peter Mulvey
- Released: 2014
- Recorded: September 2013, Signature Sound, Connecticut
- Genre: Indie music, Folk music
- Length: 34:38
- Label: Signature Sounds
- Producer: Chuck Prophet, Aidan Hawken

Peter Mulvey chronology
The Good Stuff (2012)	Silver Ladder (2014)

Silver Ladder is an album by American singer/songwriter Peter Mulvey, released in 2014.

Silver Ladder was the first album released by Mulvey after a five-year hiatus from songwriting due to personal issues. He decided to write one song a week and collected enough to record the album. The basic tracks were recorded live over two-and-a-half days followed by overdubs.

== Reception ==
Professional ratings
Review scores
Source	Rating
CultureFly	2/5 stars
Irish Times	4/5 stars
The Daily Telegraph	4/5 stars

Writing for the Irish Times, Joe Breen called the album "impressive" and wrote that although Mulvey "can go overboard... he compensates." Martin Chilton of The Telegraph called the album "grown-up country" and wrote that Mulvey had excelled himself. Jason Noble of CultureFly called the album "not a bad return, but it’s not likely to set the world on fire" and wrote "The songs are decent enough, but do suffer from a lack of impact at times, and a little more variation would help..."

The Milwaukee Journal Sentinel placed the album 7th in its year-end review of the top 10 best albums of 2014 in Milwaukee.

== Track listing ==
All songs by Peter Mulvey unless noted.

1. "Lies You Forgot You Told" – 2:24
2. "You Don't Have to Tell Me" – 2:29
3. "Sympathies" – 2:32
4. "Remember the Milkman?" (Mulvey, Matt Lorenz) – 2:47
5. "What Else Was It?" – 3:40
6. "Trempealeau" – 3:15
7. "Where Did You Go?" (Mulvey, David Goodrich, Barry Rothman) – 3:41
8. "Josephine" – 2:58
9. "Back in the Wind" (Mulvey, Paul Cebar) – 2:55
10. "Copenhagen Airport" – 2:25
11. "If You Shoot at a King You Must Kill Him" – 4:25
12. "Landfall" – 1:07

== Personnel ==
- Peter Mulvey - vocals, acoustic guitar
- Anita Suhanin – vocals
- Sara Watkins – violin, vocals
- James DePrato – guitar
- Tom Freund – bass
- Aidan Hawken – guitar, keyboards, vocals
- David Kemper – drums
- Phil Parlapiano – accordion
- Chuck Prophet – drums, guitar, vocals

== Production notes ==
- Aidan Hawken – producer
- Chuck Prophet – producer
- Dan Burns – engineer, mixing
- Ian Kennedy – mastering
- Andy Plaisted – engineer
- Meghan Dewar – design
- Hartwig Kopp-Delaney – cover photo
