= Legal Week =

British magazine

Legal Week was a weekly British magazine for business lawyers, launched in 1999 by Mark Wyatt and Mary Heaney.

== History ==
It was acquired by Incisive Media in 2005.

In 2016, the company sold the magazine to ALM (formerly American Lawyer Media). It is now a fully digital publication operating under the Law.com International brand. The magazine was a recipient of the PPA Business Magazine of the Year award.
