= MD&DI =

American business-to-business media brand

MD+DI
- Categories: Medical device, diagnostics
- Founded: 1979
- Company: Informa Markets — Engineering
- Country: United States
- Based in: Santa Monica, California
- Language: English
- Website: mddionline.com

MD+DI (Medical Device + Diagnostic Industry) is a business-to-business media brand covering the medical device and diagnostic industries. Owned by Informa Markets — Engineering, it is headquartered in Santa Monica, California, and has been in publication since 1979.

== Coverage and audience ==
MD+DI serves medtech engineers, managers, and other industry professionals, helping them develop, design, and manufacture medical devices and diagnostics that meet stringent regulatory and market requirements. In addition to its website, MD+DI publishes email newsletters, e-books, and webinars, hosts a supplier directory called Qmed+, and shares content on social media sites such as LinkedIn, X (formerly Twitter), and Facebook.

== History ==
MD+DI was established in 1979 as a monthly print magazine, reaching a circulation of 48,040 in 2009. It later transitioned to an online publication, claiming a digital readership of 89,000.

The brand has a longstanding relationship with the Medical Design & Manufacturing (MD&M) trade shows, including MD&M West, which it has sponsored since 1979. MD+DI also sponsored the Medical Design Excellence Awards and has produced a “100 Notable People in the Medical Device Industry” list.

== Editorial focus ==
In addition to technology reviews, MD+DI covers a range of business, regulatory, and industry topics, often including peer-reviewed articles on medtech safety and efficacy.
