= Safety and Health =

American magazine

- Editor: Melissa J. Ruminski
- Categories: Magazine
- Frequency: Weekly
- First issue: 1919; 107 years ago
- Country: United States
- Based in: Itasca, IL
- Language: English
- Website: safetyandhealthmagazine.com
- ISSN: 2093-7911

Safety and Health is an American magazine published by the National Safety Council.

The editor is Melissa J. Ruminski and the circulation is about 86,000 copies. The magazine was launched as National Safety News (ISSN 0028-0100) in 1919.
