= Midwives (magazine) =

Bi-monthly magazine produced for members of the Royal College of Midwives

Midwives magazine is a bi-monthly magazine produced for members of the Royal College of Midwives. It covers all aspects of maternity care, including clinical practice, education and research. It is published by Redactive Media Group on behalf of the Royal College of Midwives. It has a circulation of nearly 42,000.

== History and profile ==
Midwives was first published as Nursing notes, by Dame Rosalind Paget, shortly after the foundation of the Royal College of Midwives in 1881. The publication has had many names over the years including Nursing notes and midwives’ chronicle: for the professional nurse and midwife (1908-1939), Midwives chronicle and nursing notes (1940-1957), Midwives chronicle (1958-1995), RCM Midwives Journal (1998-2002), RCM Midwives (2002-2008). In 2008, the publication was rebranded as a magazine and titled Midwives. This coincided with Redactive Media Group becoming the title's publisher.

Midwives is the recipient of the 2016 TUC Trade Union Communications Award in the category of the best membership communication – print journal.
