= Sandlapper (magazine) =

American monthly magazine

- Former editors: Delmar L. Roberts (1968–1972)
- Categories: Regional lifestyle, Local history, Cultural interest
- Frequency: Quarterly
- Format: Softcover, Hardcover, Digital archive
- Circulation: 10,000
- Publisher: Robert P. Wilkins, Sr.
- Founder: Robert P. Wilkins, Sr. Rose Wilkins
- First issue: 1968; 58 years ago
- Final issue Number: 2011; 15 years ago Spring 2012
- Company: Sandlapper Society, Inc.
- Country: United States
- Based in: South Carolina
- Language: English
- Website: sandlapper.org
- ISSN: 1046-3267
- OCLC: 1777855

Sandlapper: The Magazine of South Carolina was a monthly magazine focused on South Carolina that ran from January 1968 (58 years ago) to 1983 (43 years ago) and from 1989 (37 years ago) to 2011 (15 years ago). The magazine focused on promoting the state’s culture, history, places, and people. Notable contributors included authors Pat Conroy, Idella Bodie, James Dickey, and Mickey Spillane. Financial support came from subscriptions and advertising revenue, and later solely from donations to the non-profit foundation The Sandlapper Society.

Sandlapper was started by Robert P. Wilkins and his wife Rose in 1968. Wilkins was sent a congratulatory letter on his creation by then-Governor Robert E. McNair, which was published in the first issue. Wilkins worked as an editor on the magazine until 1973. After his departure, others continued to keep it going until 1982.

The magazine went on a hiatus for six years in the 1980s, after a failed attempt at merging with the North Carolina magazine, Tarheel, to create Carolina Lifestyle in 1982 which ceased publication in 1983. Sandlapper was revived in 1989 by the Wilkins family, of Lexington, South Carolina, and a group of their friends. Robert P. Wilkins was editor, and several other members of the family served on the Sandlapper board. In 1990, they converted the magazine’s publication schedule to bimonthly. It was changed again to biannual publication and a hardcover format in 1991. Wilkins returned it to a quarterly softcover format in 1992, then to an annual magazine by late 1997. The last issue was published in 2011.

Sandlapper has been digitally preserved and archived by the South Carolina State Library. The collection is viewable to the public in the South Carolina Digital Library.
