= Incisive Media =

Business media company based in London, England

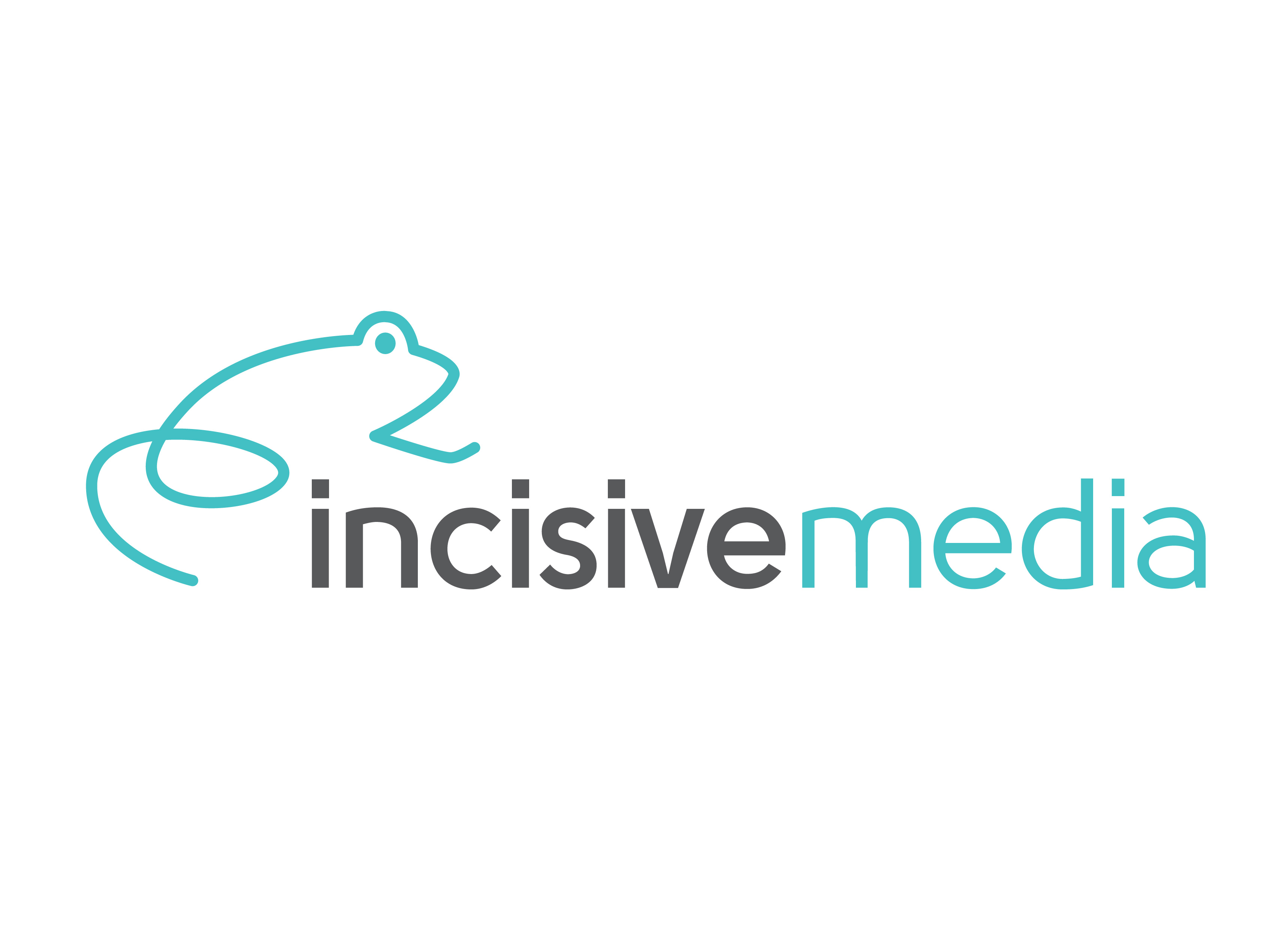
- Industry: Business Media
- Founded: 1994; 32 years ago
- Founder: Tim Weller
- Headquarters: London, England
- Key people: Tim Weller (chairman); Jamie Campbell-Harris (CFO); Jonathon Whiteley (CEO)
- Parent: Arc Media
- Website: incisivemedia.com

Incisive Media is a business-to-business financial company based in London, England.

== History ==
Incisive Media is a business-to-business (B2B) financial company founded by Tim Weller, in 1994 with the launch of Investment Week. It acquired Timothy Benn Publishing (owner of Post Magazine) in August 2000. During the next six years the business completed a number of acquisitions including Matching Hat, Risk Waters, Initiative Europe (Unquote), Search Engine Strategies, Global Professional Media, Asian Venture Capital Journal and Pacific Prospect. However, as a public company it was difficult to take advantage of some of the larger consolidation opportunities that existed, so in December 2006 Tim Weller led a management buyout deal backed by Apax Partners that valued Incisive Media at £275 million.

Within a few months of going private, Incisive Media completed the acquisitions of MSM International and UK publishing business VNU Business Publications Ltd, formerly part of The Nielsen Company, from venture capital group 3i in 2007. In August 2007 the company completed a deal to acquire ALM, an American magazine publisher that was backed by Bruce Wasserstein, which greatly increased Incisive Media's profits.

However, following the bankruptcy of Lehman Brothers and the 2008 financial crisis, Incisive Media's markets came under significant pressure. In October 2009 Incisive Media undertook a financial restructuring to cut the costs and stabilize.

In January 2016 Incisive sold the British magazine Legal Week to the US legal business publisher ALM.

In April 2022, Arc and The Channel Company acquired Incisive Media.

=== 11 September 2001 attacks ===
On 11 September 2001 Incisive Media―at the time known as Risk Waters―was hosting a conference at Windows on the World, a restaurant located on the 106th and 107th floors of the North Tower of the World Trade Center. The people who attended the meeting were killed during the attack on the towers.
