= EMS World =

- Editor: Jon Bassett
- Categories: Emergency Medical Services
- Frequency: Monthly
- Circulation: 50,000
- First issue: Nov/Dec 1972
- Company: HMP Communications
- Country: United States
- Based in: Malvern, Pennsylvania
- Language: English
- Website: www.emsworld.com
- ISSN: 2158-7833

EMS World is a brand in the Emergency Medical Services (EMS) field, which includes EMS World magazine, EMSWorld.com, EMS World Expo, Revista EMS World, and EMS World Americas.

EMS World is a magazine focusing on clinical care, systems operation, funding, research and other aspects of the prehospital emergency care profession.

EMSWorld.com provides news coverage, product information, job listings, grant resources, videos and educational features and columns.

EMS World Expo is an annual EMS focused education conference. The conference is hosted in partnership with the National Association of Emergency Medical Technicians (NAEMT). The event offers classes on tools, technologies, and trends in prehospital care and also features an exhibit hall.

Revista EMS World is the Spanish version of EMS World magazine. Launched in 2016, the magazine provides prehospital care providers with clinical education and materials that the original EMS World magazine is known for.

EMS World Americas is the newest addition to the EMS World portfolio. Launched in 2017, the educational event is held annually in locations throughout Latin America.

== History and profile ==
The magazine was established as Emergency Medical Services in 1972. In 2007, it was renamed EMS Magazine. In 2010, the publication rebranded to EMS World. It was published by Cygnus Business Media until 2014, when it was sold to SouthComm Communications. HMP Communications acquired EMS World in 2017.

The headquarters of the magazine is in Malvern, Pennsylvania.
