= International Council for Research and Innovation in Building and Construction =

Academic publisher based in Sweden

- Abbreviation: CIB
- Formation: June 1953
- Type: International non-governmental and non-profit association

The International Council for Research and Innovation in Building and Construction (known as CIB) is an international non-governmental and non-profit association that promotes international exchange and cooperation in building and construction research and innovation.

CIB was founded in Geneva, Switzerland, in June 1953 as the International Council for Building Research, Studies and Documentation. CIB replaced the International Council for Building Documentation established in Paris in 1950. The association adopted its present name in 1998 while retaining the abbreviation CIB.

CIB organizes working commissions and task groups composed of experts in defined areas of the built environment. These groups coordinate research and information-exchange projects, organize conferences, and produce scientific publications. CIB has relationships with several International Organization for Standardization technical committees. These relationships committees concerned with buildings and civil engineering works, fire safety, accessibility of the built environment, and steel structures.

== Organisation and Governance ==
CIB is governed by a General Assembly, which meets annually and has final approval over the association's policies. Every three years, the General Assembly elects a Board of up to 25 members during the CIB World Building Congress.

The Board operates through five standing committees: the Officers' Committee, Programme Committee, Administration Committee, Membership and Communications Committee, and Future Leaders Committee. CIB's research activities are organized through Working Commissions and Task Groups. Working Commissions have longer-term programmes covering broad research areas. Task Groups are established for a limited period and have more defined objectives.

=== Board ===
The current Board is led by President Dongping Fang of Tsinghua University, with Vice Presidents Ron Wakefield of RMIT University and Piia Sormunen of Tampere University. Anil Kashyap serves as Treasurer. Kim Haugbølle of Aalborg University chairs the Programme Committee, Srinath Perera of Western Sydney University chairs the Future Leaders Committee, and Georg Reichard of Georgia Institute of Technology chairs the Membership and Communications Committee. Makarand Hastak of Purdue University serves as Immediate Past President. The Board also includes 15 other members representing academic, research, and industry organizations.

=== Working Commissions and Task Groups ===
CIB organises much of its scientific activity through Working Commissions and Task Groups, which are groups of researchers and practitioners working in defined areas of the built environment. As of mid-2026, CIB has 33 active Working Commissions and 7 Task Groups. Working Commissions have a longer-term status and broader programme of activities, while Task Groups are established for a limited period with more specific objectives.

The Commissions cover a broad range of subjects, including building economics, construction management, information technology in construction, building performance, safety and health, disaster resilience and sustainable construction. Examples include commissions on Building Economics, Information Technology for Construction, Safety and Health in Construction, Smart and Sustainable Built Environments, and Disasters and the Built Environment.
