= Chiropractic Economics =

American magazine

Chiropractic Economics is an American magazine published 20 times a year in Ponte Vedra Beach, Florida. The magazine provides news and information for practicing chiropractors, with a focus on office management, patient relations, personal development, financial planning, legal, clinical and research data, and wellness/nutrition.

== Overview ==
The first issue of Chiropractic Economics was published in 1954 as the Digest of Chiropractic Economics by William L. Luckey and Helen C. Luckey.

The magazine conducts two surveys on a yearly basis; the Annual Salary and Expense Survey and the Annual Fees and Reimbursements Survey have been used by the United States Department of Labor to compile wage statistics.

Chiropractic Economics started a website in 1996, billing itself as the "Online Chiropractic Community". The site now features chiropractic news, videos, blogs, book reviews, a job board, and current and past magazine content.

According to the 2015 BPA Worldwide audit of Chiropractic Economics subscriber list, total qualified circulation is 29,174 subscriptions.
