= Money Marketing =

Money Marketing is a monthly magazine for financial intermediaries in the United Kingdom. The magazine was established in 1985 and is owned by Metropolis Group. The editor is Tom Browne and the current editorial team consists of Dan Cooper as news editor, Maria Merricks as features editor, Amanda Newman-Smith as features writer, Lois Vallely as Chief Reporter, Momodou Musa Touray as Senior Reporter and Darius McQuaid as Reporter.

== Industry awards ==
Santander personal finance trade/professional title of the year: 2015, 2016
