= Marketing Week =

Marketing industry website based in London

- Screenshot of the website in November 2024
- Editor: Russell Parsons
- Publisher: Haymarket Media Group
- Founder: Michael Chamberlain and Anthony Nares
- Founded: 1978
- First issue: March 1978
- Company: Haymarket Media Group
- Country: United Kingdom
- Based in: London
- Language: English
- Website: marketingweek.com
- ISSN: 0141-9285

Marketing Week is a website focused on the marketing industry, based in London, that grew out of what was a weekly, and latterly monthly, print magazine.

== History and profile ==
Marketing Week was launched in March 1978. Its co-founders were Graham Sherren, Michael Chamberlain, a former editor of the advertising journal Campaign, and Anthony Nares, an entrepreneur who set up Marketing Week Communications Ltd (MWC) shortly before the launch. MWC subsequently launched Creative Review and was later subsumed into Centaur Communications, a buy-in vehicle run by Sherren and Jocelyn Stevens (1982). Nares became managing director of the new organisation – a position he held until his early death in 1996. Chamberlain left Centaur in 1988 to take up a career in consultancy.

Chamberlain said of this founding period: "While planning AdNews, I received a phone call from an Anthony Nares just before Christmas 1977 saying we should meet. As I recall, he showed me a mock-up front cover of Marketing Week, to which I replied 'you don’t need to tell me any more'. In January 1978, we became partners, with Anthony as managing director and me as editor/publisher. A little over six weeks later Marketing Week was launched, cover dated 10 March 1978, price 40p, with a core, controlled circulation free to marketers, ad men and selected media people. Haymarket tried to torpedo the project with the launch of MarketFact but it was too late."

By the 1990s, according to a previous editor, Stuart Smith, Marketing Week magazine had become an editorial and commercial success: "Spring and autumn editions regularly boasted over 130 pages, thanks to a particularly strong performance in classified advertising. Our editorial staff exceeded 20 journalists. Profits reached levels never achieved before (over £6m a year)."

Marketing Week wasowned by the LSE-listed company Centaur Media plc.

ABC primary circulation of the printed magazine for 2009 was 36,619. Like other outlets, Marketing Week has shifted emphasis to its website, which is currently said to attract about 395,000 monthly unique users. In March 2017, the once weekly magazine shifted to a monthly frequency. The print magazine was discontinued in October 2020 with print subscribers being shifted to online subscriptions.

Despite its long duration, Marketing Week has had only seven editors. Chamberlain was the first, Stephen Foster (1980–1983) the second, Howard Sharman (1983–1988) the third, Stuart Smith (1988–2008) the fourth, Mark Choueke the fifth (2009–2012), Ruth Mortimer the sixth (2012–2014) and Russell Parsons (2014–).

Marketing Week’s main columnists have included Mark Ritson, Thomas Barta, Helen Edwards, cartoonist Tom Fishburne, Tanya Joseph, and Helen Tupper.

Marketing Week is also involved with the Festival of Marketing, also held annually in London. In May 2019, it was announced that Marketing Week Live and The Insight Show had been incorporated into the Festival of Marketing.

On 22 January 2019, Centaur Media announced that Marketing Week had become part of Xeim, a rebranded marketing division.

On 4 July 2019, Marketing Week announced that it was launching an online subscription service, which, according to editor Russell Parsons, would offer "subscriber exclusives" featuring "insight into the big strategic and leadership challenges" in marketing.

In September 2025, Haymarket Media Group bought Marketing Week, the Festival of Marketing and Creative Review from Centaur Media for £3.9m in cash.
