= Trade magazine =

Periodical dedicated to a particular field

Modern trade magazine Broadcast, which targets readers in the radio and television broadcast industry of the United Kingdom.

A trade magazine, also called a business-to-business magazine, trade journal, or trade paper (colloquially or disparagingly a trade rag), is a magazine or newspaper whose target audience is people who work in a particular trade or industry. The collective term for this area of publishing is the trade press.

== History ==
In 1928, Popular Aviation became the largest aviation trade magazine with a circulation of 100,000.

As digital journalism grew in importance, trade magazines started to build their presence on the internet. To retain readership and attract new subscribers, trade magazines usually impose paywall on their websites.

== Overview ==
Trade publications keep industry members abreast of new developments. In this role, they function similarly to how academic journals serve their audiences. Trade publications include targeted advertising, which earns a profit for the publication and sales for the advertisers while also providing sales engineering-type advice to the readers, which may inform purchasing and investment decisions.

Trade magazines typically contain advertising content centered on the industry in question with little, if any, general-audience advertising. They may also contain industry-specific job notices.

For printed publications, some trade magazines operate on a subscription business model known as controlled circulation, in which the subscription is free but is restricted only to subscribers determined to be qualified leads.

== See also ==
- List of trade magazines
- Professional magazine
