= Legal periodical =

Periodical about law

A legal periodical is a periodical about law. Legal periodicals include legal newspapers, law reviews, periodicals published by way of commerce, periodicals published by practitioner bodies, and periodicals concerned with a particular branch of the law.

The obituaries and profiles in legal periodicals may be useful to historians and biographers. Book reviews in legal periodicals may be useful to librarians. There is a Book Review Index in the Index to Legal Periodicals.
