= Samuel Lewis (publisher) =

British editor and publisher of topographical dictionaries and maps (c. 1782–1865)

Samuel Lewis (c. 1782 – 28 February 1865) was a British editor and publisher of topographical dictionaries and maps of the United Kingdom of Great Britain and Ireland. The aim of the texts was to give in "a condensed form" a faithful and impartial description of each place. The firm of Samuel Lewis and Co. was based in London.

== Life and career ==
Lewis was born in 1782 or 1783 and was described as a "man of no education."

He operated as a publisher of topographical dictionaries in London under the style of "S. Lewis & Co." at the following successive locations: Aldersgate Street, Hatton Garden, and Finsbury Place South. These dictionaries were successful but threatened by imitations, and his lawsuits to protect his rights became important precedents for defining British copyright for factual reference works.

Lewis was married and had at least one son, Samuel Lewis the younger, and one daughter, Eliza Lewis. He died in Islington on 28 February 1865.

== Topographical dictionaries ==
=== A Topographical Dictionary of England ===
This work contains facts illustrating the local history of England. Arranged alphabetically by place (village, parish, town, etc.), it provides a description of all English localities as they existed at the time of first publication (1831), showing where a particular civil parish was located in relation to the nearest town or towns, the barony, county, and province in which it was situated, its principal landowners, the diocese in which it was situated, and the Roman Catholic district in which the parish was located with the names of corresponding Catholic parishes. There were six subsequent editions, the last of which (1848–9) was in four volumes and an atlas.

=== A Topographical Dictionary of Wales ===
First published in 1833, there was a second edition in 1837, a third in 1843, and a fourth (in two volumes and an atlas) in 1849.

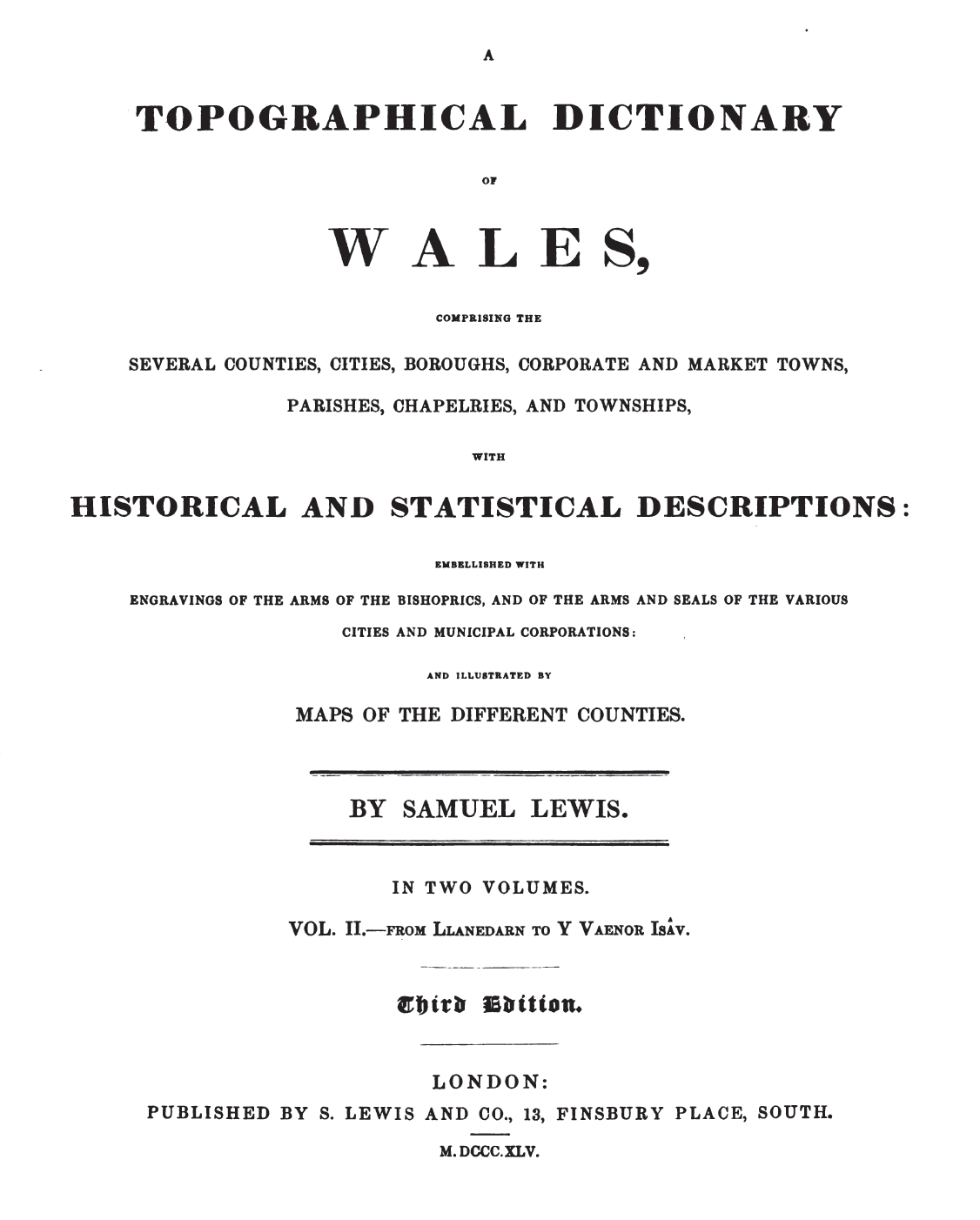
Title page of A Topographical Dictionary of Wales, volume II, 3rd edition

The title page of the first edition gives an indication of the ambitious scope of the work:

A topographical dictionary of Wales, comprising the several counties, cities, boroughs, corporate and market towns, parishes, chapelries, and townships, with historical and statistical descriptions; illustrated by maps of the different counties; and a map of Wales, showing the principal towns, roads, railways, navigable rivers, and canals; and embellished with engravings of the arms of the cities, bishoprics, corporate towns, and boroughs; and of the seals of the several municipal corporations. With an appendix, describing the electoral boundaries of the several boroughs, as defined by the late act. By Samuel Lewis in two volumes.

The work is in two large volumes with a folding map of Wales and separate county maps facing the entry for each individual county.

The 4th edition was transcribed and made available free-to-view online by the University of London.

=== A Topographical Dictionary of Ireland ===
First published in 1837 in two volumes, with an accompanying atlas, it marked a new and higher standard in such accounts of Ireland, though it initially met with controversy from the Dublin Evening Mail. The first edition is available online. A second edition was published in 1840.

In the 1837 preface, the editor noted that:

The numerous county histories, and local descriptions of cities, towns, and districts of England and Wales, rendered the publication of their former works, in comparison with the present, an easy task. The extreme paucity of such works, in relation to Ireland, imposed the necessity of greater assiduity in the personal survey, and proportionately increased the expense.

Lewis relied on the information provided by local contributors and on the earlier works published such as Charles Coote's Statistical Survey (1801), George Taylor and Andrew Skinner's Maps of the Roads of Ireland (1777), James Pigot's Trade Directory (1824) and other sources. He also used the various parliamentary reports, the census of 1831 and the education returns of the 1820s and early 1830s. Local contributors were given the proof sheets for final comment and revision. The names of places are those in use prior to the publication of the Ordnance Survey Atlas in 1838. Distances are in Irish miles (the statute mile is 0.62 of an Irish mile).

The dictionary gives a picture of Ireland before the Great Famine.

=== A Topographical Dictionary of Scotland ===
First published in 1846 in two volumes and an atlas.
