= Isaac Slater =

British publisher (1803–1883)

Isaac Slater (1803 – 3 December 1883) was a British publisher of trade directories.

He was born in Manchester. In 1818 he became the apprentice of James Pigot, a publisher of trade directories. Either in 1833, or after the death of Pigot's son in 1840, Pigot made Slater a partner in his firm, which was then called Pigot & Slater. Pigot died in 1843 and Slater then published directories in his own name.

Due to fierce competition from the firm of Kelly & Co., which in 1845 began expanding to other cities from its home market of London, Slater's company withdrew from the southern England market after 1852 and only published directories for Ireland, Scotland, and northern England.

After Slater's death, his company became a limited-liability company. A majority of its shares were acquired by Kelly & Co. in 1892, although the Kelly name did not appear on the newly acquired directories until years later (not until 1921 in Scotland).

== List of directories ==
- The commercial directory of Scotland, Ireland, and the four most Northern counties of England (1820–21 and 1822)
- Slater's National Commercial Directory of Ireland (1846)
- Slater's royal national and commercial directory and topography of the counties of Bedfordshire, Buckinghamshire, Cambridgeshire, Huntingdonshire, Norfolk, Oxfordshire, and Suffolk (1850)
- Slater's National Commercial Directory of Ireland (1881)

== See also ==
- Alexander Thom, a Scottish publisher and the founder of Thom's Irish Almanac
