= Civic Opera Building =

Office skyscraper in Chicago, Illinois

Coordinates: 41.882506°N 87.637475°W

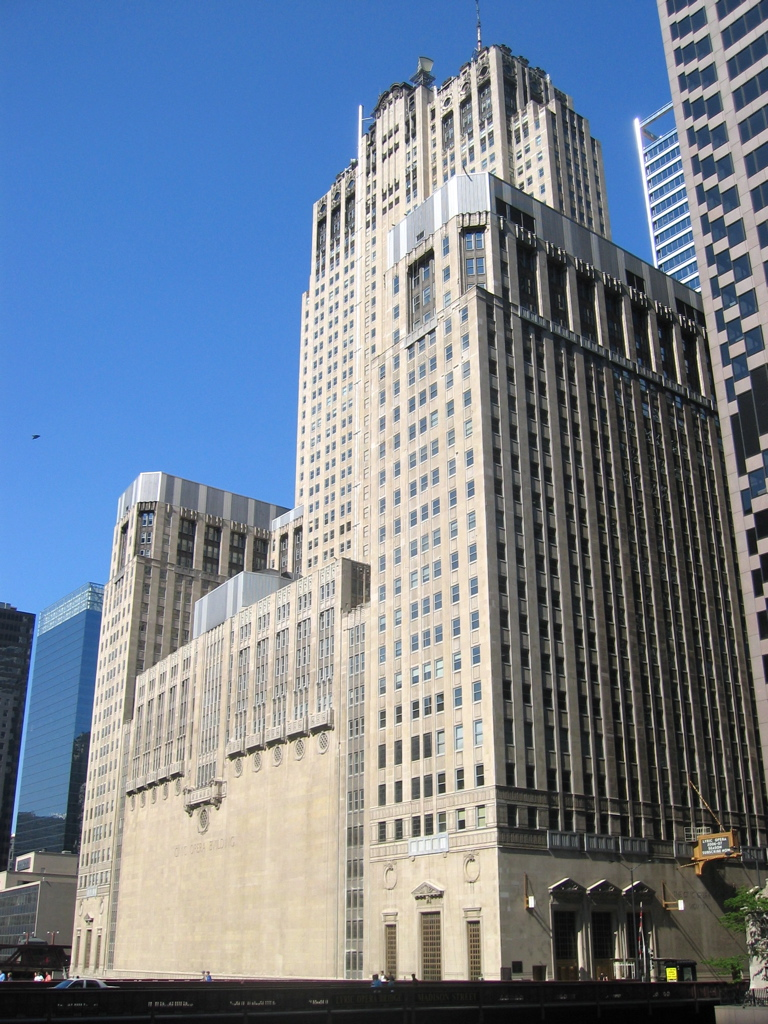
- rear facade

General information
- Status: Completed
- Architectural style: art deco
- Location: 20 North Wacker Drive
- Construction started: 1927
- Completed: 1929; 97 years ago
- Cost: $23,385,000

Height
- Height: 555'

Technical details
- Floor count: 45

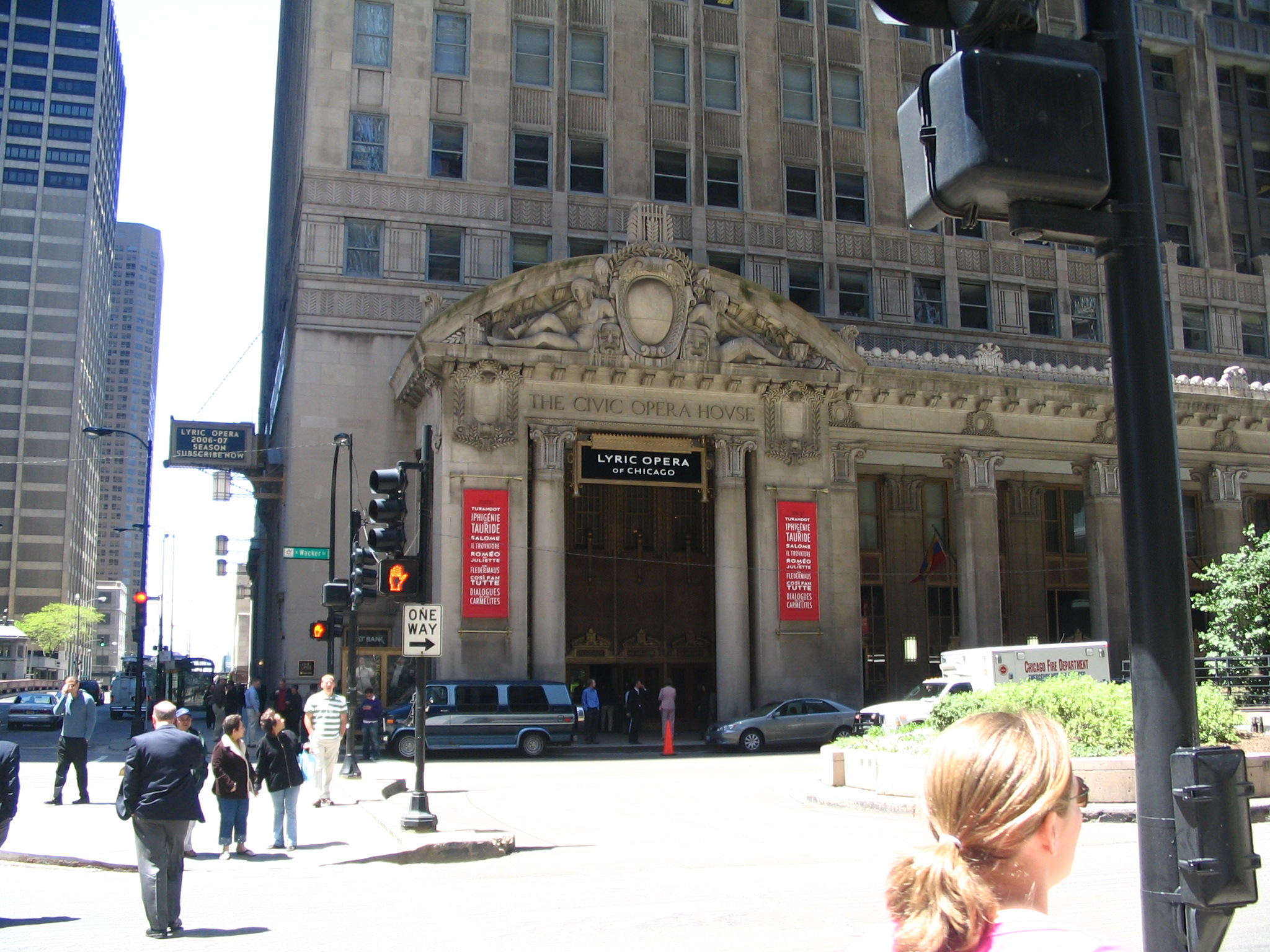
Wacker Drive façade of the Civic Opera Building with part of the arcade

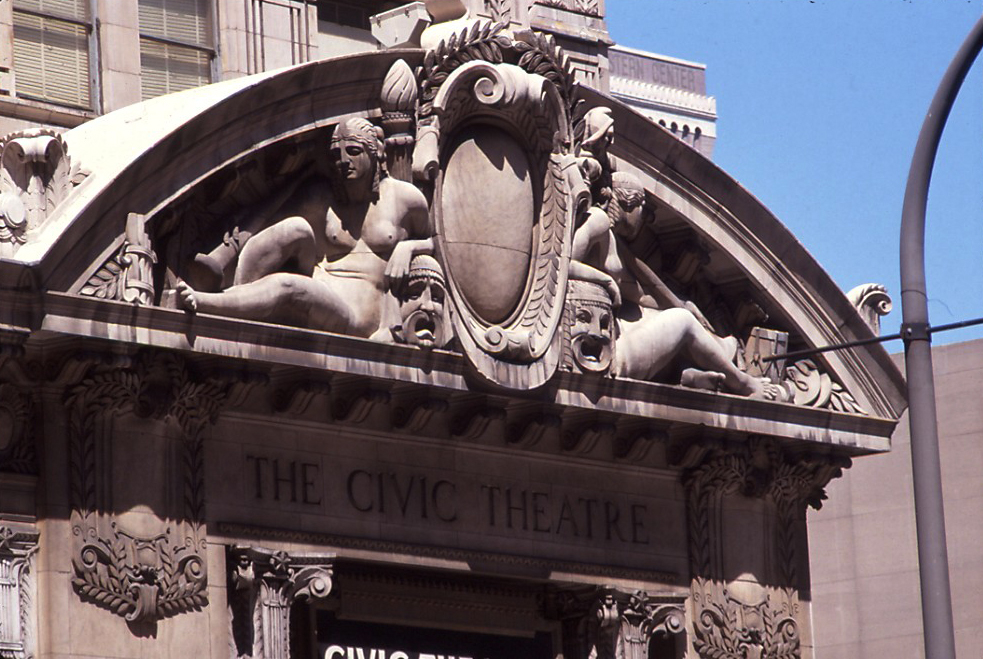
Detail of a sculpture by Henry Hering

The Civic Opera Building is a 45-story office tower (plus two 22-story wings) located at 20 North Wacker Drive in Chicago. The building opened November 4, 1929, and has an Art Deco interior. It contains a 3,563-seat opera house, the Civic Opera House, which is the second-largest opera auditorium in North America. The opera house is the permanent home of the Lyric Opera of Chicago, and the home of the Joffrey Ballet since 2021.

Samuel Insull envisioned and hired the design team for building a new opera house to serve as the home for the Chicago Civic Opera, as the company was called. The building is shaped like a huge chair, sometimes referred to as "Insull's Throne." Insull directed the chair should face west to signify turning his back on New York. Insull had left a vice presidency at General Electric in New York in 1892, after he was not named its president. Subsequently, he moved to Chicago and became president of Chicago Edison (Commonwealth Edison).

Insull selected the architecture firm Graham, Anderson, Probst & White who were responsible for several other buildings in the downtown Chicago Loop. As they did on other occasions, the architects commissioned Henry Hering to produce architectural sculpture for the building.

Mary Garden of the Chicago Civic Opera announced on July 15, 1929, that the opera's inaugural season would include the commissioned work of Hamilton Forrest entitled Camille.

During the 1950s and 1960s the building was identified by a large "Kemper Insurance" sign, although it was not that company's headquarters. In 1993, the Lyric Opera of Chicago purchased the opera house facilities in the building it had rented for 64 years.

In 2012, Tishman Speyer Properties L.P. sold the 915,000 square feet (85,000 m^{2}) office tower portion of the building for $125.8 million to an affiliate of Nanuet, N.Y.-based Berkley Properties LLC.

== Tenants ==
- Cassiday Schade
- National Automatic Merchandising Association
- Himes Consulting Group
- TechNexus Venture Collaborative
- 12five Capital, LLC
- Hybris
- Surplus Record Machinery & Equipment Directory
- Clarity Consulting
- Perficient Consulting
- Natural Resources Defense Council

== See also ==
- List of opera houses and opera companies in Chicago
