= St Matthew's Church, Hayfield =

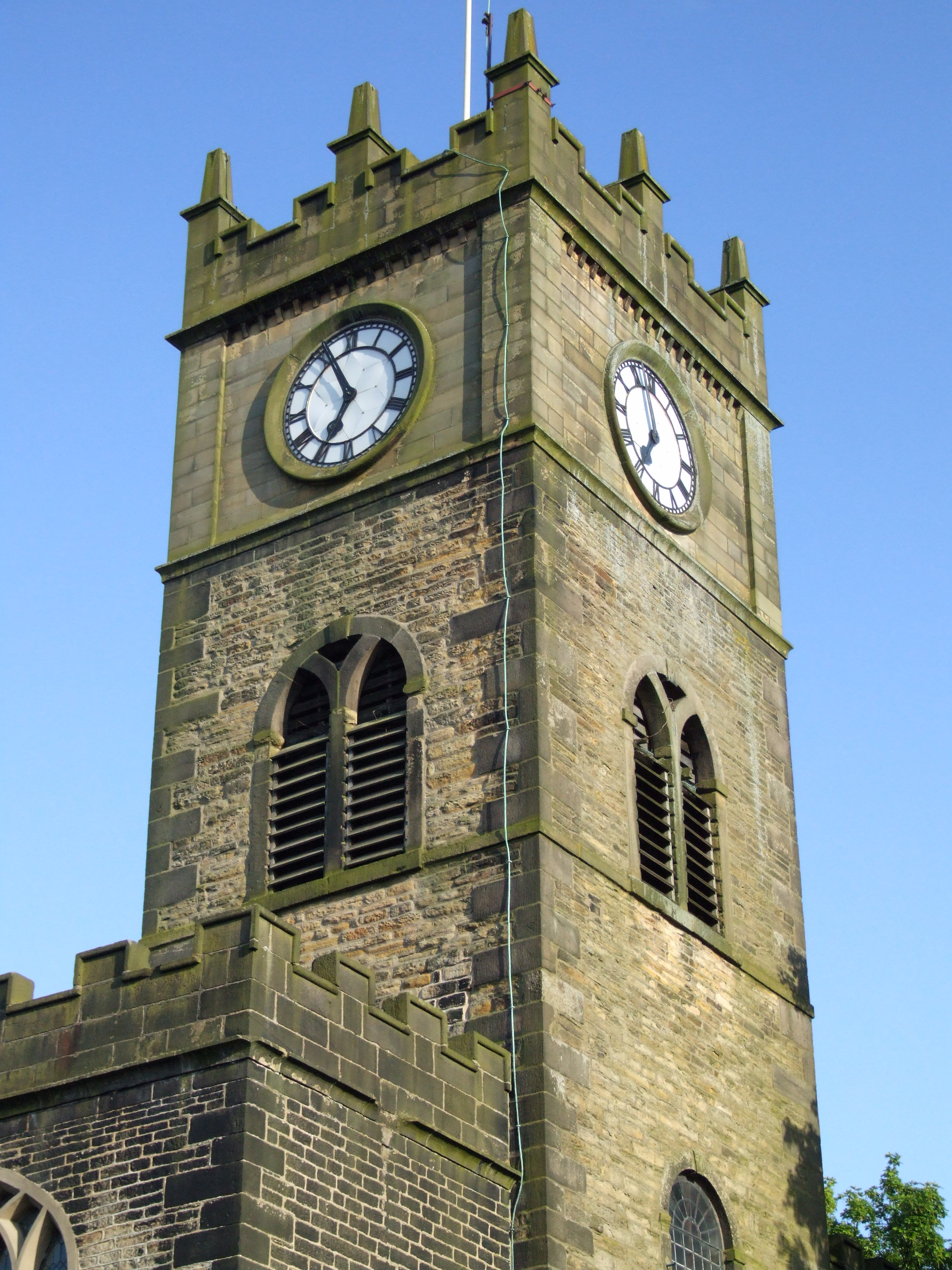
- St Matthew's church tower
- St Matthew's Church, Hayfield
- 53.379474°N 1.945874°W
- Denomination: Church of England
- Website: Church website

History
- Founded: 1386
- Dedication: Matthew the Apostle

Architecture
- Functional status: Active
- Style: Early English Gothic
- Completed: 1818

Specifications
- Materials: Gritstone ashlar

Administration
- Province: Canterbury
- Diocese: Derby
- Archdeaconry: Chesterfield
- Deanery: Peak
- Parish: Hayfield, Derbyshire

Clergy
- Vicar: The Rev Mel Hartley

Listed Building – Grade II
- Designated: 21 April 1967
- Reference no.: 1088001

St Matthew's Church, Hayfield, is the parish church of Hayfield, Derbyshire, England. The church, parts of which date from the 14th century, is a Grade II listed building and adjacent to the River Sett. Its five-stage clock tower is the main landmark for the village. The church is built in local gritstone ashlar in an Early English Gothic style and is surrounded by a small graveyard. It is also adjoined by a small church hall dating from 1977, erected over part of the graveyard, with a newly landscaped community garden on the north side of the building.

St Matthew's is an active Anglican parish church in the Diocese of Derby, arranging services on Sundays, in addition to baptisms, weddings and funerals. It is the venue for a variety of community events including concerts, art displays, and annual May Queen and well dressing festivals. The clergy is shared with the Parish of Chinley & Buxworth; the current vicar is Mel Hartley.

== History ==
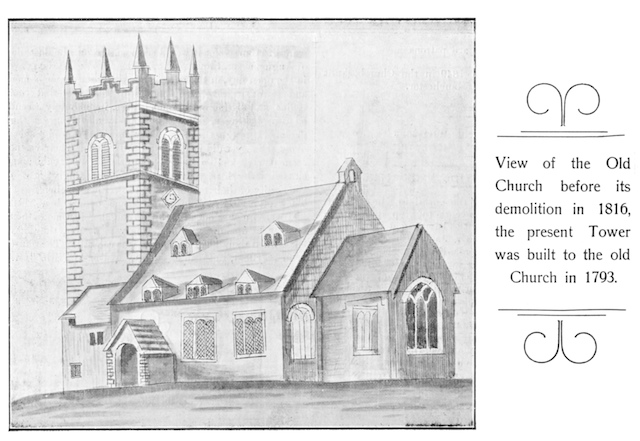
A 1909 drawing: view of the old church before its demolition in 1816. The present tower was built to the old church in 1793.

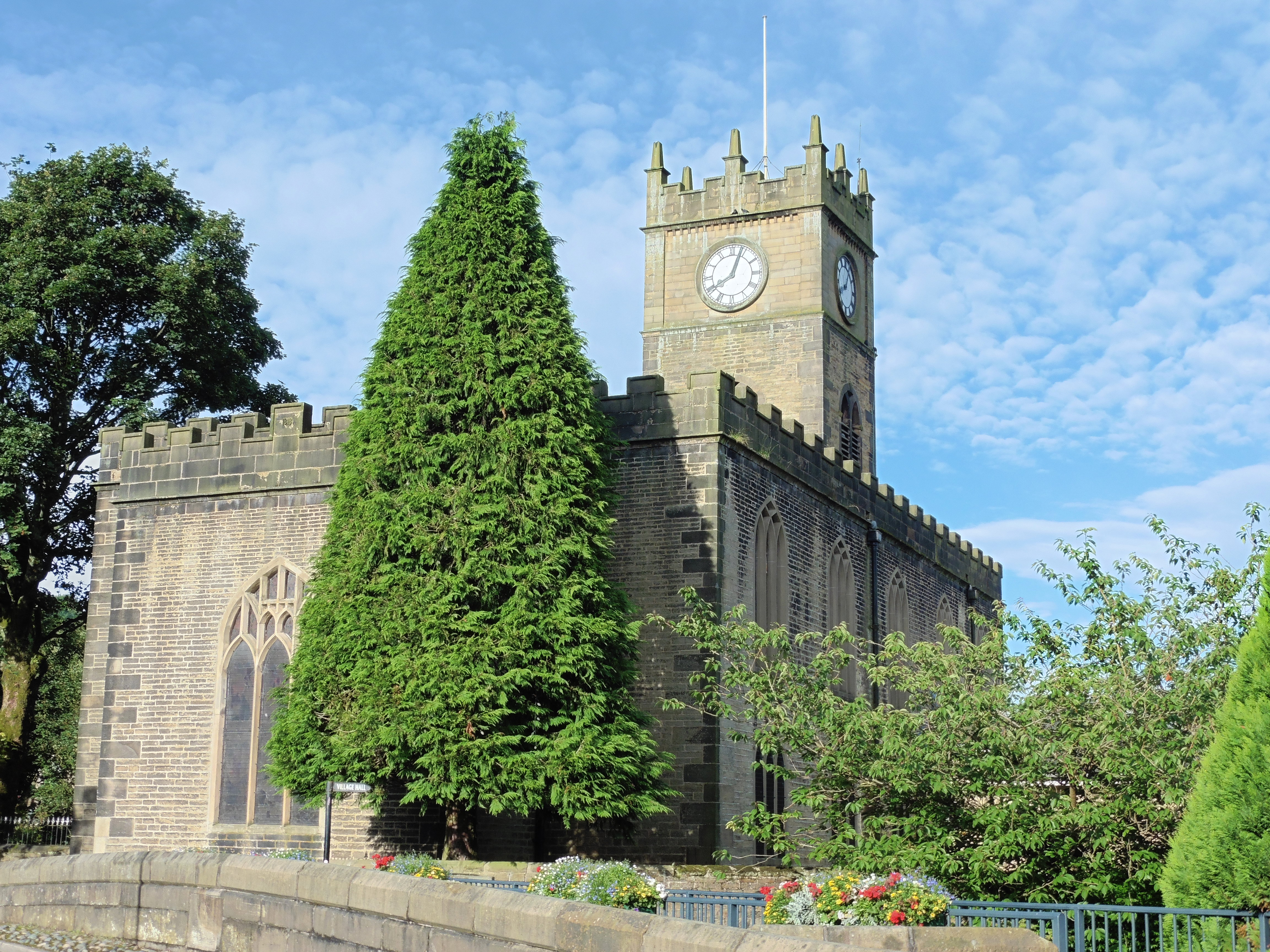
St Matthew's from the bridge over the River Sett

The village had originated in the Norman period as little more than a woodland clearing and is mentioned in the Domesday Book. The church of St Matthew has existed in its present location since 1386, having previously stood at Kirksteads, an old name given to the area where the rivers Kinder and Sett meet near Bowden Bridge. The registers of the Duchy of Lancaster record that it was completed by at least 1405. Hayfield was an independent chapelry in the far-reaching Parish of Glossop; the chapelry consisted of Great Hamlet, Phoside, Thornsett, Kinder, Beard, Ollersett, Chinley, Bugsworth and Brownside. Hayfield is described by the Parliamentary Commissioners of 1650 as "a Parochial Chapel fitt to be made a Parish".

The diary of the cleric John Wesley, who visited Hayfield in July 1748, documents a catastrophic flood after three hours of heavy rain descended from the surrounding hills: "Hayfield Church was all torn up, and the dead bodies swept out of their graves; when the flood abated they were found in many places. Some were hanging on trees, others left in meadows or grounds, some partly eaten by dogs, or wanting one or more of their members."

Several significant features were to be found in the old church. These included a rood loft, a narrow gallery extending across the space spanned by the chancel-arch. An account from shortly before its demolition in 1815 relates that the rood loft remained entire, though the upper part had been modernised. On the front of it was the picture of the Crucifixion with St Peter and St John, said to have been painted in 1755 from an ancient one. This is remarkable, as most rood screens, and particularly rood lofts and roods, were removed and destroyed in most English churches at the Reformation.

A local ghost story is connected to St Matthew's. According to the tale, on the last day of August 1745 Dr James Clegg, the minister of a Presbyterian church at nearby Chapel-en-le-Frith, wrote to the Glossopdale Chronicle reporting that "hundreds of bodies rose out of the grave in the open air" and "singing in concert", from the graveyard of St Matthew's Church. They then proceeded to disappear, leaving Dr Clegg to remark: "... what is become of them or in what distant region of this vast system they have since fixed their residence no mortal can tell."

In the year 1793, the tower was rebuilt to its current form, including six bells (a seventh was added in 1909 and an eighth in 1947). The rest of the church was rebuilt in 1818, at a cost of £2458, unassisted by any public grant. The builders were Bradbury and Rangeley. The tower was raised in 1894; to place a new clock with four dials, and to chime the hour and quarter. It was funded entirely by members of the Slack and Bennett families, costing nothing to the church.

Below the present church is a crypt, extending under the whole of the church body, chancel and tower. The floor was raised several feet higher to prevent the floods, to which it had been subject, from entering the building, the pillars of the old church being shortened to support the wooden floor of the present church.

St Matthew's Church is recorded in the National Heritage List for England as a Grade II listed building, having been designated on 21 April 1967. Grade II is the lowest of the three grades of listing, and is applied to "buildings that are of special interest".

The present church hall was built in 1977 over part of the churchyard and is linked to the church. This building has had major alterations, levelling the floors for accessibility, creating a prayer room, refurbishing the kitchen and providing more toilet facilities.

== Description ==
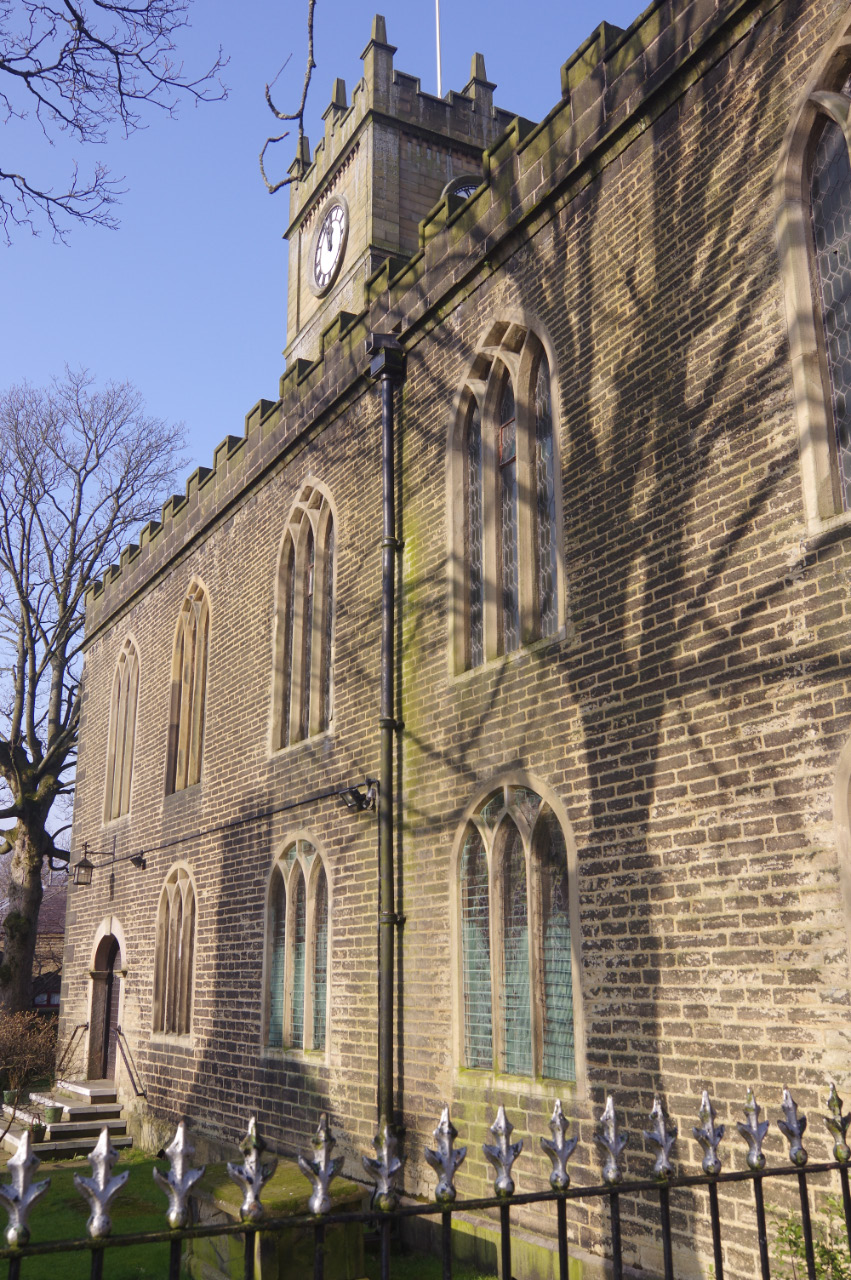
The south side of the church in 2017, showing the 1818 section with Early Gothic nave windows

Externally, the church is constructed of coursed, squared, gritstone with quoins and flush gritstone dressings. The stone parapets are uniformly castellated and it has tripartite windows with intersecting tracery. The south elevation contains a wide doorcase with four steps, moulded imposts and a keystone, and double studded doors. To the west is the central, slightly advanced, five-stage tower. The fourth stage contains eight bells (six from 1793, two later) and twin semi-circular headed bell openings with Y tracery. The fifth stage of the tower, on which is evident slightly different ashlar, was raised in 1894, and features a four-faced clock made by William Potts & Sons of Leeds. According to Pigot's Directory of 1835, Hayfield Parish Church is "a handsome modern edifice, rebuilt by the inhabitants in 1818, and the interior is much admired for its neatness." Nikolaus Pevsner described the church in 1953 as "characteristic of its date".

=== Interior ===
The interior, which has wooden galleries on three sides, has an 1849 organ at its west end, and contains a notable monument of 1786 to Joseph Hague, moved there from Glossop church. Hague was an 18th-century local benefactor from Park Hall, Little Hayfield. It has a white marble inscribed plaque set in yellow marble, surmounted by a bust of Hague created by Bacon. The galleries are supported by thin quatrefoil cast-iron columns and corbels decorated by a flowerhead. Original box pews are located underneath. Late-19th-century stained glass fills the lower nave windows and the pointed chancel arch.

The central box pews in the nave were replaced by chairs so the church could more easily provide an area for social activities, and the back of the nave was converted into a foyer.

== See also ==
- Listed buildings in Hayfield, Derbyshire
