= Surplus Record Machinery & Equipment Directory =

Business directory

Surplus Record
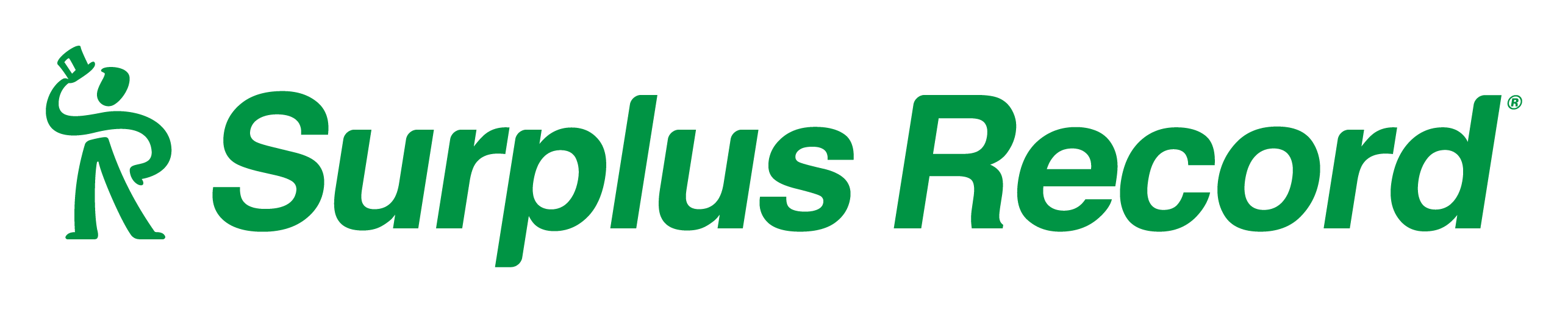
- Type: Private
- Industry: Publishing
- Founded: 1924
- Founder: Thomas P. Scanlan
- Headquarters: Chicago, Illinois, United States
- Area served: Worldwide
- Services: Advertising
- Website: www.surplusrecord.com

Surplus Record is a business directory of surplus, new, and used machine tools, machinery, and industrial equipment in the United States. It was founded in 1924 by Thomas P. Scanlan.

The monthly directory, which is hundreds of pages long, has been referred to as "the bible of the used and surplus capital equipment industry". Postings were included online in the 1980s and online auctions started in 1999. A year later, in April 2000, FreeMarkets Inc., a business-to-business online marketplace, announced that it completed the acquisition of iMark.com Inc. including assets of Surplus Record Inc., as well as SR Auction Inc. The acquisitions were integrated with FreeMarkets' existing asset business to form the FreeMarkets AssetExchange, a leading B2B eMarketplace for buying and selling new and used assets.

The record's listings have included more than 100,000 industrial assets such as metalworking and fabricating machine tools, woodworking tools, chemical and process equipment, cranes, air compressors, pumps, motors, circuit breakers, generators, transformers, turbines. More than 1,000 businesses list with the online Surplus Record.

== History ==
Thomas P. Scanlan (1896–1986), was the founder and publisher of the Chicago-based Surplus Record. Mr. Scanlan was a University of Notre Dame graduate. After World War I, he began Surplus Record, which grew into a national trade publication for the used-machinery business which listed used machine tools and capital equipment. The first publication of the Surplus Record directory was in November 1924.

During World War II, Scanlan advised manufacturers on ways of keeping their equipment in production, testified to Congress regarding the price stabilization of machine tools Office of Price Administration, and after the war he helped companies dispose of war surplus property.

Headquartered in the Chicago Civic Opera House building since 1932, it is the oldest tenant in the building. The Surplus Record has been available online since 1986, when buyers would use 2400-baud modems to access it. Currently, it is the largest online directory in the world for surplus capital equipment. The company started its own online auctions in 1999, a year before it was acquired.

== Services ==
Surplus Record is exclusively a publisher, and offers advertising services to Dealers, Auctioneers, Public Utility, and Manufacturers who want to sell their machinery, electrical, and power equipment through listings on the website as well as a monthly publication circulated to 55,000 manufacturers each month and 130,000 unique manufacturers over the course of a year. Services also include advertising upcoming auctions to a key target group of dealers or manufacturers using the mailing and email lists Surplus Record updates and maintains every day. Other advertising services such as website banner ads, display ads in the book, machinery wanted ads, are also offered.
