= The Medical Directory =

British directory of the medical profession

The Medical Directory is a directory of the physicians of the United Kingdom, published in London and Edinburgh. Founded in 1846, until 1869 it was called The London and Provincial Medical Directory.

Both titles were begun by John Churchill, of Princes Street, Soho, Westminster, the first appearing for the years 1847 to 1869. The series of printed annual volumes under the present title runs from 1870, with some missing years from 2006 on. It was published successively by John Churchill and Sons, London (1870); J. and A. Churchill, London, 1871 to 1971; Churchill Livingstone, Edinburgh and London, 1972 to 1994; Cartermill International, 1995, 1996; FT Healthcare 1997, 1998; FT Pharmaceuticals, 1999; and then by Informa Professional. A single edition called "2006/2007" was published for those two years. There was no issue for 2011. The edition for 2014 was published by CRC Press in November 2013, in two volumes, and that for 2015 by Routledge in December 2014, with 4854 pages and a price of £750.

The numbering of the volumes continues a series with the title The London and Provincial Medical Directory, first published in 1846 for the year 1847, so that the issue of 1880 is called "Thirty-sixth annual issue".

By 1861, The London and Provincial Medical Directory had taken over and absorbed The Medical Directory for Scotland and The Medical Directory for Ireland.
