= Alan Stone (opera director) =

Alan Stone (April 28, 1929 – July 9, 2008) was an American opera director, opera singer, and vocal coach. Born and raised in Chicago, Stone notably founded the Chicago Opera Theater in 1974. He served as the company's artistic director for almost two decades, stepping down from the position in 1993 after health problem stemming from a 1984 stroke made it impossible for him to continue.
