= Alexander Thom (almanac editor) =

Scottish almanac publisher

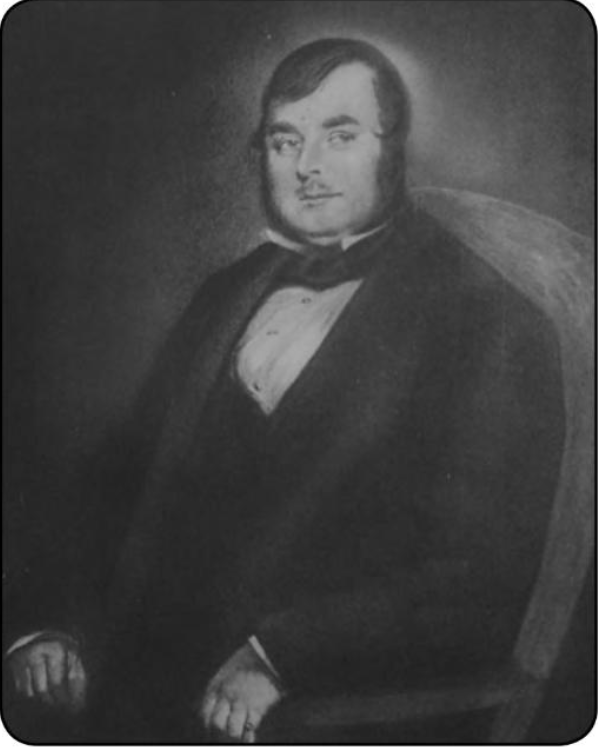
Portrait of Alexander Thom by Charles Grey (1844)

Thom's Irish who's who (1923)

Alexander Thom (1801–1879) was a Scottish publisher, the founder of Thom's Irish Almanac.

== Life ==
He was born at Findhorn in Moray, the son of the writer and journalist Walter Thom. He was educated at the High School, Edinburgh, and went to Dublin at age 20 to assist his father in the management of the Dublin Journal. On his father's death he obtained, through the influence of Sir Robert Peel, the contract for printing for the post office in Ireland. In 1838 he obtained the contract for the printing for all royal commissions in Ireland, and in 1876 was appointed to the post of Queen's Printer for Ireland.

In 1844, Thom founded the work for which he is known, the Irish Almanac and Official Directory, which became a leader in its field, incorporating statistics relating to Ireland.

At the beginning of the 1852 edition, a page-long introduction, or 'Advertisement', was included, in which an unnamed author, presumably Thom himself, reflected briefly upon the history of the publication:

A very brief inspection of the Volume of The Irish Almanac and Official Directory for the year 1852, will suffice to show that the Publisher, so far from relaxing his exertions to maintain the preference bestowed on the work since its commencement in 1845, has used every means afforded him to render it still more worthy of the influential and years increasing patronage with which it has been honoured.

Thom supervised its publication for over 30 years, passing the copyright to his son-in-law Frederick Pilkington in 1876. "Thom's Directory" was revised annually; in 1960 it was split into Thom's Dublin Street Directory and Thom's Commercial Directory, revised in alternate years until 2012. James Joyce relied heavily on the 1904 edition when writing Ulysses.

In 1860, he published for free distribution A Collection of Tracts and Treatises illustrative of the Natural History, Antiquities, and the Political and Social State of Ireland, two volumes which contain reprints of writers on Irish affairs in the seventeenth and eighteenth centuries. Included are works of James Ware, Edmund Spenser, Sir John Davies, William Petty, George Berkeley, and others such as Gerard Boate, Thomas Prior and Arthur Dobbs.

In 1878, during a printers' strike in Dublin, Thom sent work to Scotland. The resulting publicity brought the issue to the attention of the Westminster Parliament.

Thom, who was twice married, died at his residence, Donnycarney House, near Dublin, on 22 December 1879. Today the house forms the clubhouse of Clontarf Golf Club.

== List of Thom's Directories available free online ==
Year	Title	Citation (Link)
1847	Thom's Irish Almanac and Official Directory with the Post Office Dublin City and County Directory, 4th Annual Publication	
1850	Thom's Irish Almanac and Official Directory with the Post Office Dublin City and County Directory, 7th Annual Publication	
1851	Thom's Irish Almanac and Official Directory with the Post Office Dublin City and County Directory, 8th Annual Publication	
1852	Thom's Irish Almanac and Official Directory with the Post Office Dublin City and County Directory, 9th Annual Publication	
1857	Thom's Irish Almanac and Official Directory with the Post Office Dublin City and County Directory, 14th Annual Publication	
1859	Thom's Irish Almanac and Official Directory with the Post Office Dublin City and County Directory, 16th Annual Publication	
1862	Thom's Irish Almanac and Official Directory of the United Kingdom of Great Britain and Ireland, 19th Annual Publication	
1868	Thom's Irish Almanac and Official Directory of the United Kingdom of Great Britain and Ireland, 25th Annual Publication	
1870	Thom's Irish Almanac and Official Directory of the United Kingdom of Great Britain and Ireland, 27th Annual Publication	
1871	Thom's Irish Almanac and Official Directory of the United Kingdom of Great Britain and Ireland, 28th Annual Publication	
1872	Thom's Irish Almanac and Official Directory of the United Kingdom of Great Britain and Ireland, 29th Annual Publication	
1873	Thom's Irish Almanac and Official Directory of the United Kingdom of Great Britain and Ireland, 30th Annual Publication	
1874	Thom's Irish Almanac and Official Directory of the United Kingdom of Great Britain and Ireland, 31st Annual Publication	
1875	Thom's Irish Almanac and Official Directory of the United Kingdom of Great Britain and Ireland, 32nd Annual Publication	
1876	Thom's Irish Almanac and Official Directory of the United Kingdom of Great Britain and Ireland, 33rd Annual Publication	
1877	Thom's Irish Almanac and Official Directory of the United Kingdom of Great Britain and Ireland, 34th Annual Publication	
1878	Thom's Irish Almanac and Official Directory of the United Kingdom of Great Britain and Ireland, 35th Annual Publication	
1879	Thom's Irish Almanac and Official Directory of the United Kingdom of Great Britain and Ireland, 36th Annual Publication	
1880	Thom's Irish Almanac and Official Directory of the United Kingdom of Great Britain and Ireland, 37th Annual Publication	
1881	Thom's Official Directory of the United Kingdom of Great Britain and Ireland, 38th Annual Publication	
1883	Thom's Official Directory of the United Kingdom of Great Britain and Ireland, 40th Annual Publication	
1884	Thom's Official Directory of the United Kingdom of Great Britain and Ireland, 41st Annual Publication	
1894	Thom's Official Directory of the United Kingdom of Great Britain and Ireland, 51st Annual Publication	
1898	Thom's Official Directory of the United Kingdom of Great Britain and Ireland, 55th Annual Publication	
1900	Thom's Official Directory of the United Kingdom of Great Britain and Ireland, 57th Annual Publication	
1903	Thom's Official Directory of the United Kingdom of Great Britain and Ireland, 60th Annual Publication	
1909	Thom's Official Directory of the United Kingdom of Great Britain and Ireland, 66th Annual Publication	
1910	Thom's Official Directory of the United Kingdom of Great Britain and Ireland, 67th Annual Publication	

== See also ==
- Isaac Slater

== Sources ==
- Thom, Alexander, ed. (1852). Thom's Irish Almanac and Official Directory, with the Post-Office Dublin City and County Directory, for the year 1852. Dublin: Alexander Thom, Printer and Publisher, 87 and 88, Abbey-Street.

Attribution

This article incorporates text from a publication now in the public domain: "Thom, Alexander". Dictionary of National Biography. London: Smith, Elder & Co. 1885–1900.
