= James Pigot =

British publisher of directories (1769 – 1843)

James Pigot (1769 – 15 Feb 1843) was a British publisher of directories, and a pioneering publisher of trade directories.

He was born in Macclesfield. In 1811 he began publishing trade directories for Manchester, competing with the firm of R. & W. Dean but later joining with them in 1815 to produce Pigot & Dean's Manchester and Salford Directory.

He began publishing The Commercial Directory in 1814, and expanded to other cities, including London in 1823. He brought his son into his firm Pigot & Co., but his son died in 1840. He made his apprentice Isaac Slater a partner into the firm, which became Pigot & Slater.

The titles of the directories varied from New Commercial Directory or National Commercial Directory, and finally Royal National and Commercial Directory and Topography.

His company stopped producing directories for London and the Home Counties after 1840 in the face of fierce competition from the firm of Kelly & Co. Pigot died in 1843, and Slater continued publishing directories on his own (after 1852 only for northern England, Scotland, and Ireland). After Slater's own death in 1883, the company was bought by Kelly & Co. in 1892.

Pigot is buried in St. John's Church, Deansgate, Manchester (without an epitaph).

== See also ==
- Pigot's Directory
