= List of opera houses and opera companies in Chicago =

This is a list of opera houses and associated opera companies in Chicago.

== Current ==
The main opera house in Chicago, Illinois, is currently the Civic Opera Building (1929), whose resident company since 1954 has been the Lyric Opera of Chicago.

- Chicago Opera Theater, founded as Chicago Opera Studio in 1974, resident at the Harris Theater
- Lithuanian Opera Company of Chicago, founded by Lithuanian emigrants in 1956 for presenting operas in Lithuanian
- Haymarket Opera Company, founded in 2010, produces operas and oratorios from the 17th and 18th centuries using period instruments and historically informed staging conventions.

== History of Chicago opera houses and associated companies ==
- Crosby's Opera House (1865–1871) was an opera house in Chicago, Illinois, founded by Uranus H. Crosby, destroyed by fire
- Grand Opera House (1872–1958), built at 546 N. Clark Street (119 N. Clark Street today) by John Austin Hamlin
- Chicago Opera House (1885–1913) constructed in 1884–5, demolished in May 1913
- Auditorium Theatre, situated within the Auditorium Building, Chicago (1889), bowling alley for US servicemen 1941–45, re-opened in 1967
  - Chicago Grand Opera Company (1910–1915), Chicago's first resident opera company, produced four seasons of opera in Chicago's Auditorium Theater from the fall of 1910 through November 1915.
  - Chicago Opera Association, produced seven seasons of grand opera in Chicago's Auditorium Theater from 1915 to 1921, bankrupted by the soprano Mary Garden
  - Chicago Civic Opera at the Auditorium Theater from 1922 to 1928, and at its own Civic Opera House from 1929 to 1931
- Civic Opera House opened 4 November 1929, with Chicago Civic Opera as resident company until 1931
  - Chicago Grand Opera Company gave three seasons of opera at the Civic Opera House from 1933 to 1935, after the collapse of the Chicago Civic Opera in 1932
  - Chicago City Opera Company produced five seasons at Civic Opera House from 1935 to 1939, succumbed to financial difficulties, succeeded by the Chicago Opera Company.
  - Chicago Opera Company, based around Fortune Gallo's San Carlo Opera Company (1910–1954): gave six seasons of opera at the Civic Opera House from 1940 to 1946 (excluding 1943)
    - There was no resident opera company in Chicago between 1946 and 1953
  - Lyric Opera of Chicago, founded in 1954 as 'Lyric Theatre of Chicago' changed to its present name in 1956

== See also ==
Thalia Hall (Chicago), an auditorium built in 1892
