= Chicago Opera Theater =

American opera company

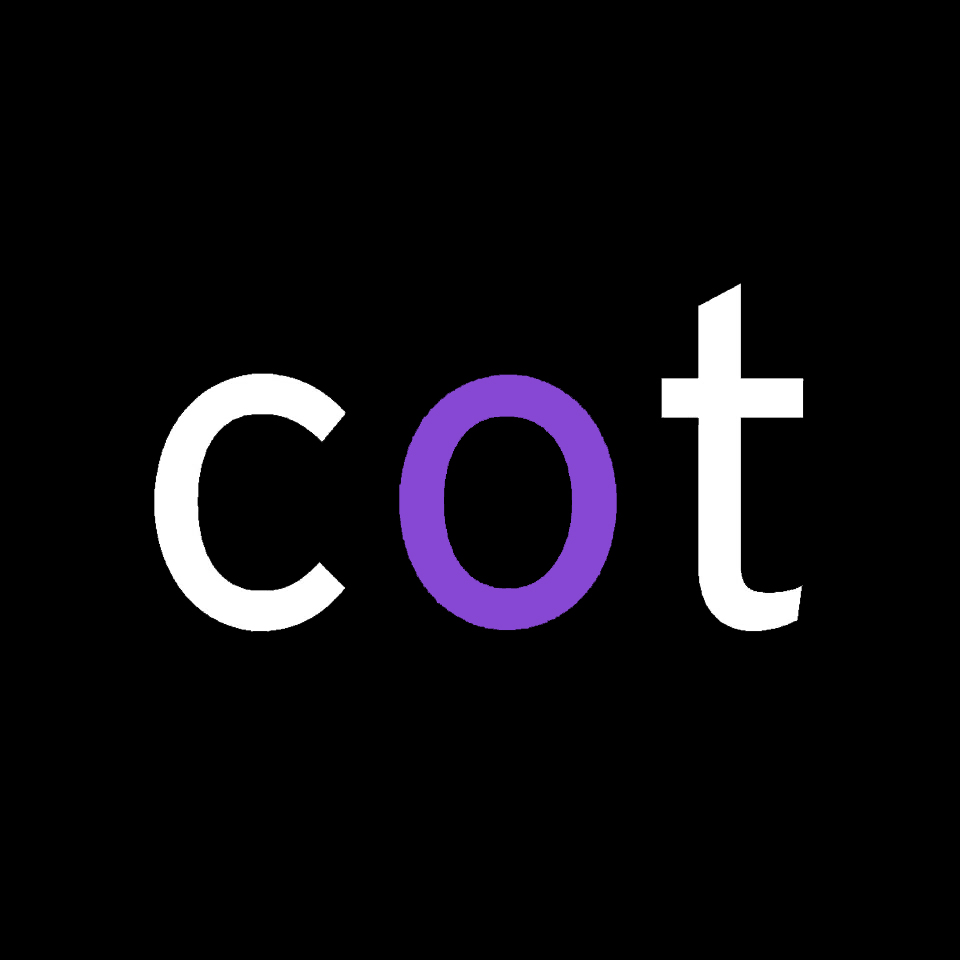
Logo

The Chicago Opera Theater (COT) is an American opera company based in Chicago, Illinois. COT is a resident company at the Harris Theater for Music and Dance in Chicago's Millennium Park and is currently in residence at the newly renovated Studebaker Theater in the historic Fine Arts Building. In addition to productions of selected operas from the core opera repertoire, COT has an emphasis on American composers, Chicago premieres, and producing new contemporary operas for a 21st-century audience.

Alan Stone founded the company as the Chicago Opera Studio in 1974. Stone utilised Jones Commercial High School as the mainstage location for the company until 1976. Subsequently, the company held a residency at the Athenaeum Theatre on the north side of Chicago through 2004. The company also gave occasional performances at the Merle Reskin Theater of De Paul University and at Rosary College in River Forest, Illinois.

Stone served as artistic director of COT until 1993. General managers of COT have included Marc Scorca (1984–1990), Mark Tiarks, Jean Perkins, and Joseph De Rugeriis.

Brian Dickie became general director of COT in 1999, and held the post until August 2012. In December 2011, COT named Andreas Mitisek as its next general director, effective in 2012. In February 2017, COT announced that Mitisek would step down as artistic director at the expiration of his contract in September 2017. Douglas Clayton, formerly the executive director, assumed the role of General Director on September 1, 2017.

In June 2017, COT announced the appointment of Lidiya Yankovskaya as its next music director, with immediate effect. Yankovskaya is the first female conductor to hold the music directorship of COT. In February 2019, Clayton stepped down and Ashley Magnus, former general manager, assumed the role of general director.

== See also ==
- List of opera houses and opera companies in Chicago
