= Listed buildings in Hayfield, Derbyshire =

Hayfield is a civil parish in the High Peak district of Derbyshire, England. The parish contains 58 listed buildings that are recorded in the National Heritage List for England. Of these, one is listed at Grade II*, the middle of the three grades, and the others are at Grade II, the lowest grade. The parish contains the village of Hayfield, the smaller settlements of Little Hayfield and Rowarth, and the surrounding countryside and moorland. Most of the listed buildings are houses, cottages and associated structures, farmhouses and farm buildings. The other listed buildings include a church and a chapel, a packhorse bridge and a road bridge, a hotel and a public house.

== Key ==
| Grade | Criteria |
|---|---|
| II* | Particularly important buildings of more than special interest |
| II | Buildings of national importance and special interest |

== Buildings ==
| Name and location | Photograph | Date | Notes | Grade |
|---|---|---|---|---|
| Fox Hall; 53.37947°N 1.94400°W | | 1625 | The house is in gritstone with quoins, and a stone slate roof with coped gables and kneelers. There are two storeys and attics, and three gabled ranges, the gables of the three bays forming the south front. The outer doorway in the middle bay has a four-centred arched head, and above it is a coat of arms. The inner doorway has a similar arch, a moulded architrave and an initialled and dated lintel. The windows are mullioned with up to eight lights and hood moulds, and in the gables are two-light mullioned windows, over each of which is a blind round-arched head. | II |
| Brookhouses (west); 53.39830°N 1.95342°W | | 17th century | A house, later altered and divided, it is in gritstone with large quoins, a bracketed moulded eaves gutter, and a stone slate roof. There are two storeys, and a U-shaped plan, with a gabled cross-wing to the west. The doorway has a chamfered surround and massive quoins. Most of the windows are mullioned, and there are semicircular single-light windows. | II |
| Fox Hall Barn; 53.37957°N 1.94435°W | | 17th century | The barn, which has been converted for residential use, is in gritstone with quoins, a stone slate roof, and two storeys. There are two doorways with shouldered lintels, and the windows, which are irregularly placed, are a mix; some are mullioned, and some are later inserted casements. | II |
| Highgate Hall; 53.37436°N 1.93969°W | | 17th century | The house is in gritstone with large quoins and stone slate roof. There are two storeys and two bays. On the front is a porch, at the rear is a doorway with a chamfered quoined surround and a pointed arched lintel, and the windows are mullioned. | II |
| Matleymoor Farmhouse; 53.40307°N 1.96507°W | | 17th century | The farmhouse, which was extended in the 19th century, is in gritstone with quoins and a stone slate roof. There are two storeys and three bays. On the front is a porch, most of the windows are mullioned with casements, and there are later inserted windows. | II |
| Long Lee; 53.39749°N 1.97967°W | | 1668 | A farmhouse in gritstone with massive quoins, and a stone slate roof with coped gables and kneelers. There are two storeys and a T-shaped plan. In the eastern angle is a two-storey gabled porch with moulded gables and kneelers. The central doorway has a massive shouldered lintel. There are two semicircular-headed windows, and the other windows are mullioned, one with an initialled and dated lintel. | II |
| Outbuilding south of Long Lee; 53.39729°N 1.97953°W | | c. 1670 | The outbuilding is in gritstone with massive quoins, and a stone slate roof with moulded gable copings and kneelers, and two storeys. In the upper floor of the south front is a three-light mullioned window, the west front contains a doorway with a chamfered surround, massive quoins and a pointed lintel, and in the north gable wall is a doorway with massive quoins, above which is a window with a semicircular head. | II |
| Barn east of Long Lee; 53.39759°N 1.97915°W | | Late 17th century | The barn, the east end of which has been converted into a cottage, is in gritstone with massive quoins and a stone slate roof. There are two storeys, and on the south front is a full-height opening flanked by rectangular openings. The cottage has a gabled porch, and mullioned windows that have been altered. | II |
| Hazelhurst Farmhouse; 53.37582°N 1.93958°W | | 1678 | The farmhouse, later a private house, is in gritstone, with quoins, square eaves corbels, and a stone slate roof. There are two storeys, two bays, and a rear outshut. The central doorway has flush jambs and an inscribed and dated shouldered lintel, and the windows are mullioned with three lights. | II |
| Barn south-southeast of Long Lee; 53.39732°N 1.97929°W | | 1679 | The barn, later converted for residential use, is in gritstone with massive quoins, a moulded string course, and a stone slate roof with moulded gable copings and kneelers. There are two storeys and three bays. The doorway has a massive quoined and chamfered surround, and an initialled and dated lintel. The windows are mullioned, and in the north wall is a circular opening with pierced openings on each side. | II |
| Birch Hall Farmhouse and outbuildings 53.37962°N 1.95925°W | | 1704 | The farmhouse and outbuildings are under a continuous roof, and are in gritstone with quoins and a stone slate roof. There are two storeys, and the buildings form an L-shaped plan. The farmhouse has a gabled porch, above which is a datestone carved with figures and animals. To the left are sash windows, and to the right are two-light mullioned windows. Further to the right are an alley doorway, and a barn containing a large arched opening with a quoined surround. At the rear is a doorway with a chamfered quoined surround, a dated lintel and a dated quoin, and triangular vents. | II |
| Barn, Booth Farm; 53.38621°N 1.92311°W | | 1715 | The barn is in gritstone with an asbestos sheet roof. It contains a large central opening with a wooden lintel, and a dated re-used keystone. | II |
| Barn at Marl House; 53.39599°N 1.95194°W | | 1721 | A gritstone barn with a stone slate roof and two storeys. It contains a doorway with a chamfered quoined surround and an initialled and dated lintel, and three slit vents. | II |
| Hill House Cottages and barn 53.38027°N 1.92425°W | | 1723 | A farmhouse and barn converted into two cottages and a barn, they are in gritstone with a stone slate roof and two storeys. The doorway has a quoined surround, and above it is an initialled datestone. Most of the windows are mullioned, and there is a 19th-century sash window. In the barn is a full cruck truss. | II |
| Hill Houses Farmhouse and barn 53.38008°N 1.92366°W | | Early 18th century | The farmhouse and barn are in gritstone with quoins and a stone slate roof. The farmhouse has two storeys and three bays. The doorway has a quoined surround, over the doorway is a single-light window, and the other windows are mullioned. To the east is a large barn. | II |
| Ivy Farmhouse; 53.38962°N 1.95059°W | | Early 18th century | A gritstone farmhouse with a stone slate roof, two storeys and three bays. In the centre of the south front is a doorway with a segmental-arched head and a fanlight, flanked by sash windows. At the rear is a central tall semicircular-headed stair window, and the other windows are mullioned. | II |
| Marl House; 53.39582°N 1.95185°W | | Early 18th century | A house that has been extended into the attached barn, it is in gritstone with large quoins and a stone slate roof. There are two storeys and, with the extension, six bays. The doorway has large imposts and jambs, and a lintel with an incised keystone. The windows are mullioned and transomed. | II |
| Barn opposite The Birches; 53.37896°N 1.95173°W | | Early 18th century | The barn is in gritstone with massive quoins, and a stone slate roof with low eaves. There are two doorways, one with a timber lintel, the other with a stone lintel, and a high opening with massive quoins and a massive stone above acting as a hood mould. | II |
| Barn, Ivy Farm; 53.38940°N 1.95017°W | | 1728 | The barn is in gritstone with massive quoins and a stone slate roof. It is partly in two storeys and partly in one. The barn contains three doorways with chamfered quoined surrounds, and shouldered, dated and initialled lintels, slit vents, and an inserted window. | II |
| Booth Farmhouse and Cottage; 53.38626°N 1.92281°W | | 1739 | The farmhouse and cottage are under a continuous roof, and are in gritstone with quoins, a stone slate roof, and two storeys. The house has three bays, and a central doorway with a semicircular head and a quoined surround. Above it is a single-light window, and the other windows are mullioned with three or four lights. The cottage to the right has a single bay, a doorway with a hood mould, and sash windows. | II |
| Brookhouses (east); 53.39832°N 1.95304°W | | 18th century | A barn with a wing added in the 19th century and later converted into a house, it is in gritstone with large quoins, a stone slate roof, and two storeys. On the south front is a doorway with a massive quoined surround, in the wing is a glazed arch, and in both parts are 20th-century windows. | II |
| Old Packhorse Bridge; 53.38007°N 1.92628°W | | 18th century (probable) | The packhorse bridge crosses the River Kinder. It is gritstone and a consists of a single shallow arch with coped sides, cobbled on top. The bridge has a span of about 3 metres (9.8 ft), and is about 1 metre (3 ft 3 in) wide. | II |
| Upper House; 53.38752°N 1.90801°W | | 1754 | A house, previously a hunting lodge and a farmhouse, it was extended in 1905. The building is in gritstone with stone slate roofs, coped gables and moulded kneelers. It is partly in two storeys, partly in one, and has a quadrangular plan with a central courtyard. The west front has a range with a doorway and mullioned windows, to the left is a gabled cross-wing, and to the right is an embattled tower. The tower contains a porch with a four-centred arch, above which is a three-light window with a hood mould, and a sundial. In the south front is another embattled tower, with two storeys, a four-centred arch, buttresses, and a bartizan on the east corner. | II |
| 4, 6, 8 and 10 Church Street; 53.37911°N 1.94571°W | | 1771 | A terrace of houses, later shops with residential accommodation, in gritstone with quoins and a stone slate roof. There are three storeys and five bays. In the ground floor are doorways with large jambs and imposts, and shop windows, and the upper floors contain three-light mullioned windows. In the top floor is an initialled datestone. | II |
| Stones House Farmhouse; 53.37578°N 1.92555°W | | 1771 | The farmhouse, later a private house, is in gritstone with quoins and a stone slate roof. There are two storeys and three bays. The central doorway has a large lintel and jambs, and the windows are mullioned with three lights. Between the upper floor windows is a datestone with an inscription. | II |
| 22 and 24 Church Street; 53.37850°N 1.94532°W | | Late 18th century | A pair of cottages in gritstone with a stone slate roof. There are two storeys and two bays. On the front is a doorway to the right with a flush surround, and three-light mullioned windows with casements. | II |
| 25, 27 and 29 Cote Lane; 53.38106°N 1.94187°W | | Late 18th century | A terrace of thee weavers' cottages in gritstone with slate roofs. There are three storeys and five bays. The windows are mullioned with three lights, and contain casements or sashes. | II |
| 13 Kinder Road; 53.38013°N 1.94524°W | | Late 18th century | A house with a workshop above, later a shop with accommodation above, it is in gritstone with a slate roof. There are three storeys and two bays. The central doorway has large jambs, and is flanked by shop windows. The upper floors contain four-light mullioned windows, and between the top floor windows is a blocked opening with a timber lintel. | II |
| 4 New Mills Road; 53.37828°N 1.94556°W | | Late 18th century | A gritstone house with a stone late roof, three storeys and one bay. The doorway on the left has a flush surround, and in each floor is a three-light mullioned window with casements. | II |
| 41 New Mills Road; 53.37856°N 1.94919°W | | Late 18th century | A gritstone house in a terrace with a slate roof, three storeys and one bay. The doorway on the left has a flush surround, and in each floor is a three-light mullioned window with casements. | II |
| 49 New Mills Road; 53.37856°N 1.94953°W | | Late 18th century | A gritstone house in a terrace with a slate roof, three storeys and one bay. The doorway on the left has a flush surround, and in each floor is a three-light mullioned window with casements. | II |
| 51 New Mills Road; 53.37857°N 1.94960°W | | Late 18th century | A gritstone house in a terrace, with a slate roof, three storeys and two bays. The doorway in the left bay has a flush surround, and the windows are casements, some retaining their mullions. | II |
| Bankend Farmhouse and barn 53.37760°N 1.93832°W | | Late 18th century | The farmhouse and barn are under a continuous roof, and are in gritstone with quoins. The house has a stone slate roof, two storeys and two bays. It contains a doorway with large jambs, and mullioned windows. The barn to the east projects, it has an asbestos roof, and contains a blocked doorway. | II |
| Carr Meadow Cottages; 53.40162°N 1.94989°W | | Late 18th century | A row of three cottages, later combined, in gritstone with painted stone dressings and a stone slate roof. There are two storeys and each former cottage has two bays. On the front are two porches, and the windows are mullioned, containing sashes or casements. | II |
| Outbuilding, Coldwell Clough Farm; 53.36950°N 1.91681°W | | Late 18th century | The outbuilding is in gritstone with massive dressings and quoins, a stone slate roof, and two storeys. It contains three doorways with large imposts, a doorway with jambs, and above are two openings, one with a mullion. In the south gable end is an initialled datestone, and in the north gable end are external steps up to the loft. | II |
| Royal Hotel; 53.37947°N 1.94489°W | | Late 18th century | A vicarage, later a hotel, in gritstone with painted stone dressings, quoins, a string course, a moulded cornice, and a stone slate roof with coped gables and moulded kneelers. The main block has three storeys and five bays, and to the right is a two-storey range with five bays. The central doorway has a plain entablature, and the windows are sashes with moulded architraves. | II |
| Stubbs; 53.37451°N 1.93639°W | | Late 18th century | A farmhouse, later a private house, in gritstone with quoins, and a stone slate roof with coped gables and moulded kneelers. There are two storeys, three bays, and a later extension to the west. The central doorway has flush jambs and a lintel. Most of the windows are mullioned, there is a single-light window over the doorway, French windows, and at the rear is a T-shaped stair window. | II |
| The Spinnery; 53.37849°N 1.94682°W | | Late 18th century | A house, later a shop, in gritstone with a bracketed eaves gutter, and a stone slate roof. There are three storeys and two bays. On the front are two doorways, the original one off-centre, and an inserted doorway to the right with a pointed wooden canopy. The windows are mullioned with three lights. | II |
| Kinder Lodge; 53.37844°N 1.94668°W | | 1778 | A public house with quoins, a bracketed eaves gutter, and a stone slate roof. There are three storeys, two bays, and a recessed two-storey extension on the right. The central doorway has large imposts and jambs, and the windows are mullioned. Between the upper floor windows is an initialled datestone. | II |
| 17, 19 and 21 Kinder Road; 53.38004°N 1.94511°W | | 1780 | A terrace of three cottages in gritstone with quoins and a stone slate roof. There are three storeys and three bays. Each cottage has a doorway on the left, and a three-light mullioned window in each floor, and some windows have been inserted later. In the top floor is an initialled datestone. | II |
| Methodist Chapel; 53.37837°N 1.94749°W | | 1782 | The chapel, which was altered in the early 20th century, is in gritstone with quoins, a string course, gutter corbels on the side walls, and coped gables with finials. There are two storeys and fronts of three bays. The entrance front is gabled, and has a gabled porch flanked by semicircular-headed windows with rusticated surrounds. Above the porch is a Venetian window under which is an inscribed plaque, flanked by semicircular-arched windows with projecting sills, imposts and keystones. There are two tiers of similar windows along the sides. | II |
| Phoside Farmhouse; 53.37097°N 1.94537°W | | 1784 | A gritstone farmhouse with quoins and a stone slate roof. There are two storeys and three bays. The central doorway has a quoined surround and a rectangular fanlight. Above it is an initialled datestone, over which is a Venetian window, and the other windows are mullioned with two casements. | II |
| Former Bull's Head Inn; 53.37922°N 1.94582°W | | 1788 | The former public house is in gritstone with quoins and a slate roof. There are three storeys and three bays. The doorway has a moulded architrave and a hood, and the windows are sashes, some with mullions. Between the upper floor windows is a plaque with an inscription and the date. | II |
| St Matthew's Church; 53.37949°N 1.94589°W | | 1794 | The oldest part of the church, which incorporates some 14th-century material, is the tower, the body of the church was rebuilt in 1817–18, and a clock stage was added to the tower in 1894. The church is built in gritstone, and consists of a nave, a small chancel, and an embraced west tower. The tower has five stages, string courses, semicircular-headed windows and bell openings. There is a circular clock face on each front, over which is a coved string course, embattled parapets and finials. The windows in the body of the church have four lights and intersecting tracery, the doorway has a semicircular head, and along the body of the church are embattled parapets. | II |
| Coldwell Clough Farmhouse and barn 53.36960°N 1.91656°W | | 1804 | The farmhouse and barn are under a continuous roof, and are in gritstone with quoins, a bracketed moulded wooden eaves gutter, and a stone slate roof. The farmhouse has two storeys, three bays, and a single-storey extension to the right. The doorway has a moulded architrave, a dated and inscribed lintel, and a bracketed hood. Above the doorway is a decorated plaque, and the windows are mullioned with three lights. The barn contains two doorways with quoined surrounds, one with a flat head, the other with a four-centred arch. On the gable end is a finial carved with a crouching animal. | II |
| Old Pine Barn Farmhouse; 53.37108°N 1.93202°W | | 1807 | The farmhouse is in rendered stone with painted stone dressings and a stone slate roof. There are two storeys and three bays. The central doorway is set in an arched recess, above it is an initialled datestone, and over that is a single-light window. The other windows are mullioned with three lights, and contain casements. | II |
| Barn, Coldwell Clough Farm; 53.36958°N 1.91698°W | | 1808 | The barn is in gritstone with quoins and a stone slate roof. On the front is a wide depressed arch with a quoined surround and a dated keystone, and slit vents. At the rear is a narrow doorway with a large shouldered lintel. | II |
| Park Hall; 53.39236°N 1.94690°W | | 1811 | A small country house, later divided, it is in gritstone with a moulded cornice, a parapet and a hipped slate roof. There are two storeys, a main block with seven bays, the middle bay projecting, a recessed long wing to the east, and an orangery to the west. In the centre is a doorway with four Ionic columns, a rectangular fanlight, and an entablature, flanked by sash windows. Above the doorway is a three-light mullioned window with an architrave, and the windows elsewhere are sashes. On the west front are two canted bay windows. | II |
| Hay Barn west of Marl House; 53.39581°N 1.95220°W | | c. 1820 | The hay barn is in gritstone with a stone slate roof. There is a single storey, seven bays, and a lean-to extension to the north. Along each of the east and west fronts are six square Doric columns, and in the gable ends are three vertical rows of vents. | II |
| Stable block, Park Hall; 53.39183°N 1.94413°W | | 1820 | The stable block, which was converted into flats in the 1970s, is in gritstone with quoins, a dentilled and moulded cornice, and a slate roof with central and gable end pediments. In the centre of the roof is a cupola with rusticated semicircular-headed openings, vented louvres, and a pyramidal top with a ball finial and a weathervane. There are two storeys and a crescent plan. In the ground floor the openings have semicircular-arched heads, linked by an impost band. The upper floor contains rectangular sash windows. | II* |
| 1 Steeple-End Fold; 53.37928°N 1.94614°W | | Early 19th century | A house, at one time a shop, in gritstone with rusticated quoins and a stone slate roof. There are three storeys and a front of one bay. In the ground floor is a shop front with a three-light window, and a doorway to the right. Above it is a moulded cornice on decorative scroll brackets. The upper floors contain three-light mullioned windows, and in the right return are two-light mullioned windows. | II |
| Ashes Farmhouse; 53.37373°N 1.91821°W | | Early 19th century | Two farmhouses, later combined, in gritstone with a stone slate roof. There are two storeys and four bays. The two doorways have moulded capitals and lintels. The windows are sashes, some with a single light, and others with three lights and mullions. | II |
| Throstle Farmhouse; 53.38828°N 1.94606°W | | Early 19th century | A farmhouse in rendered stone with rusticated quoins, painted gritstone dressings, an eaves band, and a stone slate roof. There are two storeys and three bays. In the north front is a semicircular-headed doorway with moulded imposts, a fanlight, and a keystone, and the windows are sashes. | II |
| Tunstead Clough and walls 53.37739°N 1.91943°W | | Early 19th century | A gritstone house with a sill band, and a stone slate roof with coped gables and moulded kneelers. There are two storeys and attics, and three bays. The central semicircular-headed doorway has a moulded architrave, imposts, a fanlight, and a keystone with a lozenge motif. The windows are sashes with flush surrounds. At the front is a stone garden wall that has square gate piers with shallow pyramidal tops, and iron gates with arrow head finials. | II |
| The Old School House; 53.37772°N 1.94436°W | | c. 1830 | The school house has been converted into a private house, and is in gritstone with a stone slate roof, two storeys and six bays. On the front are two doorways with large surrounds, and the windows on the front are sashes with heavy lintels. In the west gable end is a wide doorway with a rusticated semicircular arch. | II |
| Stables, Booth Farm; 53.38605°N 1.92306°W | | 1837 | The stables with a loft above are in gritstone with quoins. On the north front are two doorways and two openings, all with flush surrounds. Over one of the doorways is a datestone. | II |
| The Bridge; 53.37954°N 1.94546°W | | 1837 | The bridge carries Church Street over the River Sett. It is in gritstone and consists of a single depressed segmental arch. The bridge is about 4 yards (3.7 m) wide, and has a keystone, a string course, low parapet walls with dressed copings, and an inscribed and dated plaque on the north wall. | II |
| 22 New Mills Road; 53.37864°N 1.94732°W | | Mid-19th century | A gritstone house with quoins, a sill band, a moulded cornice, a low parapet with a low central pediment, and a slate roof with a coped gable on the left. There are two storeys and three bays, the middle bay projecting slightly. The central doorway has a segmental head, a fluted architrave, projecting imposts, a segmental fanlight, a keystone, and narrow side lights. The other windows are sashes. | II |
