= Walter Thom =

Scottish writer and journalist

Walter Thom (1770–1824) was a Scottish writer and journalist.

== Life ==
He was born at Bervie, Kincardineshire, and later moved to Aberdeen, where he established himself as a bookseller. In 1813 he went to Dublin, as editor of the Dublin Journal, assisted by his son Alexander Thom. He died in there on 16 June 1824.

== Works ==
Thom was the author of a History of Aberdeen (Aberdeen, 1811) and of a treatise on Pedestrianism (Aberdeen, 1813). He also contributed to Brewster's Encyclopædia, to Sir John Sinclair's Statistical Account of Scotland, and to William Shaw Mason's Statistical Account of Ireland.
