= Civic Opera House =

Opera house in Chicago, Illinois

Coordinates: 41.8823°N 87.6373°W

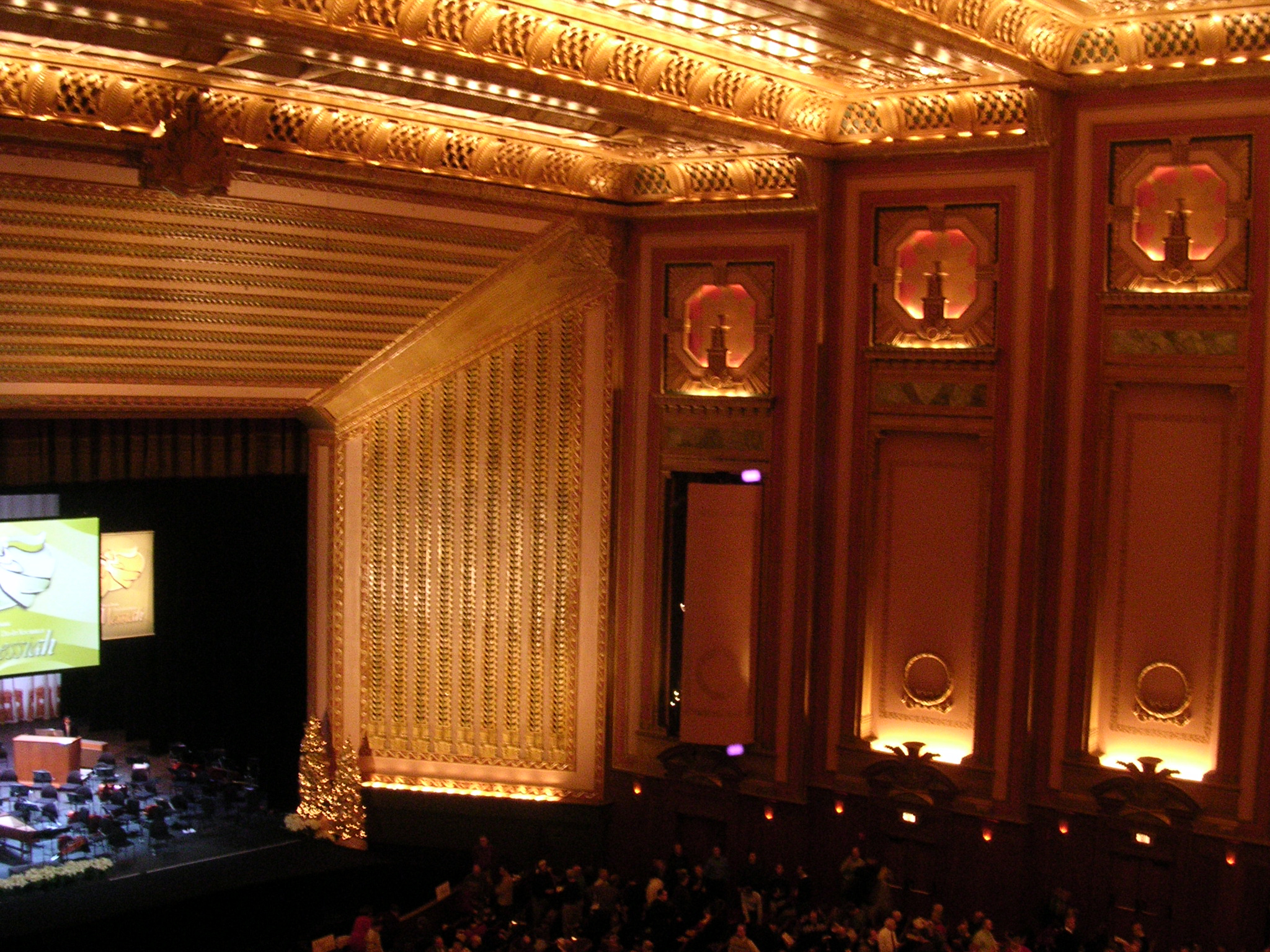
- Auditorium, named in honor of Ardis Krainik.

- Location within Chicago Location within Illinois Location within the United States
- Address: 20 North Wacker Drive; Chicago, Illinois; United States
- Capacity: 3,276 seats (formerly 3,563)
- Type: Opera house

Construction
- Opened: November 4, 1929; 96 years ago

The Civic Opera House, also often referred to as the Lyric Opera House, is an opera house located at 20 North Wacker Drive in Chicago. The Civic's main performance space, named for Ardis Krainik, seats 3,276, making it the second-largest opera auditorium in North America, after the Metropolitan Opera House. Built for the Chicago Civic Opera, it has been home to the Lyric Opera of Chicago since 1954 and the Joffrey Ballet since 2021. It is part of a complex with a 45-story office tower and two 22-story wings, known as the Civic Opera Building that opened November 4, 1929 and features Art Deco details.

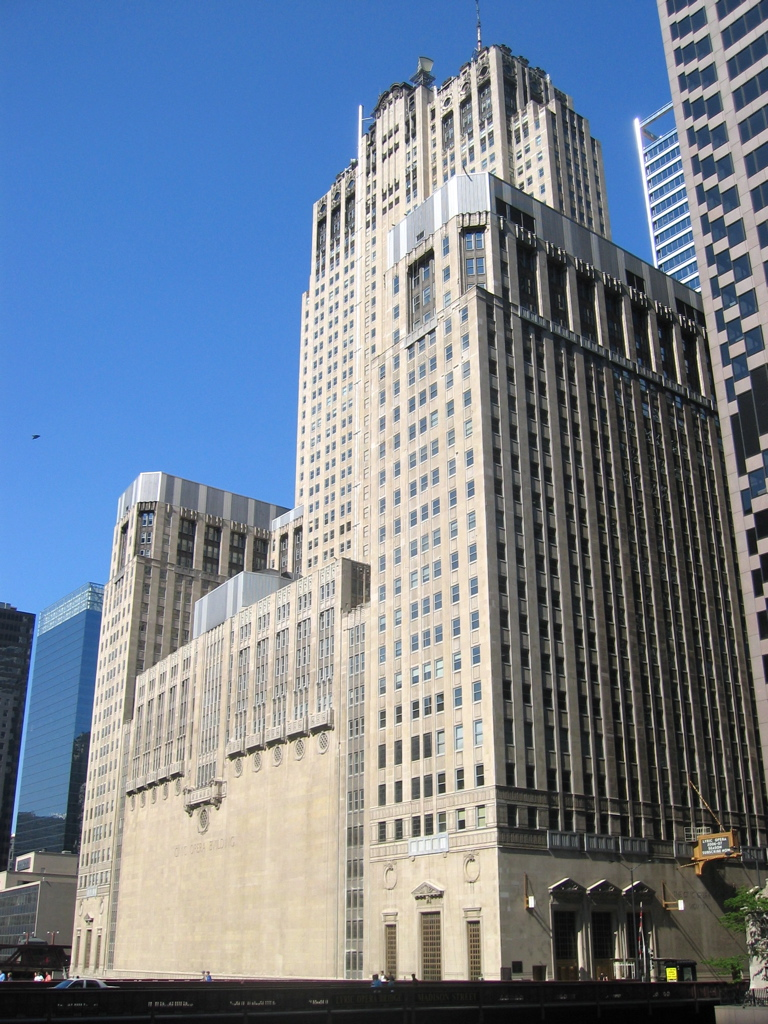
West façade of the Civic Opera House

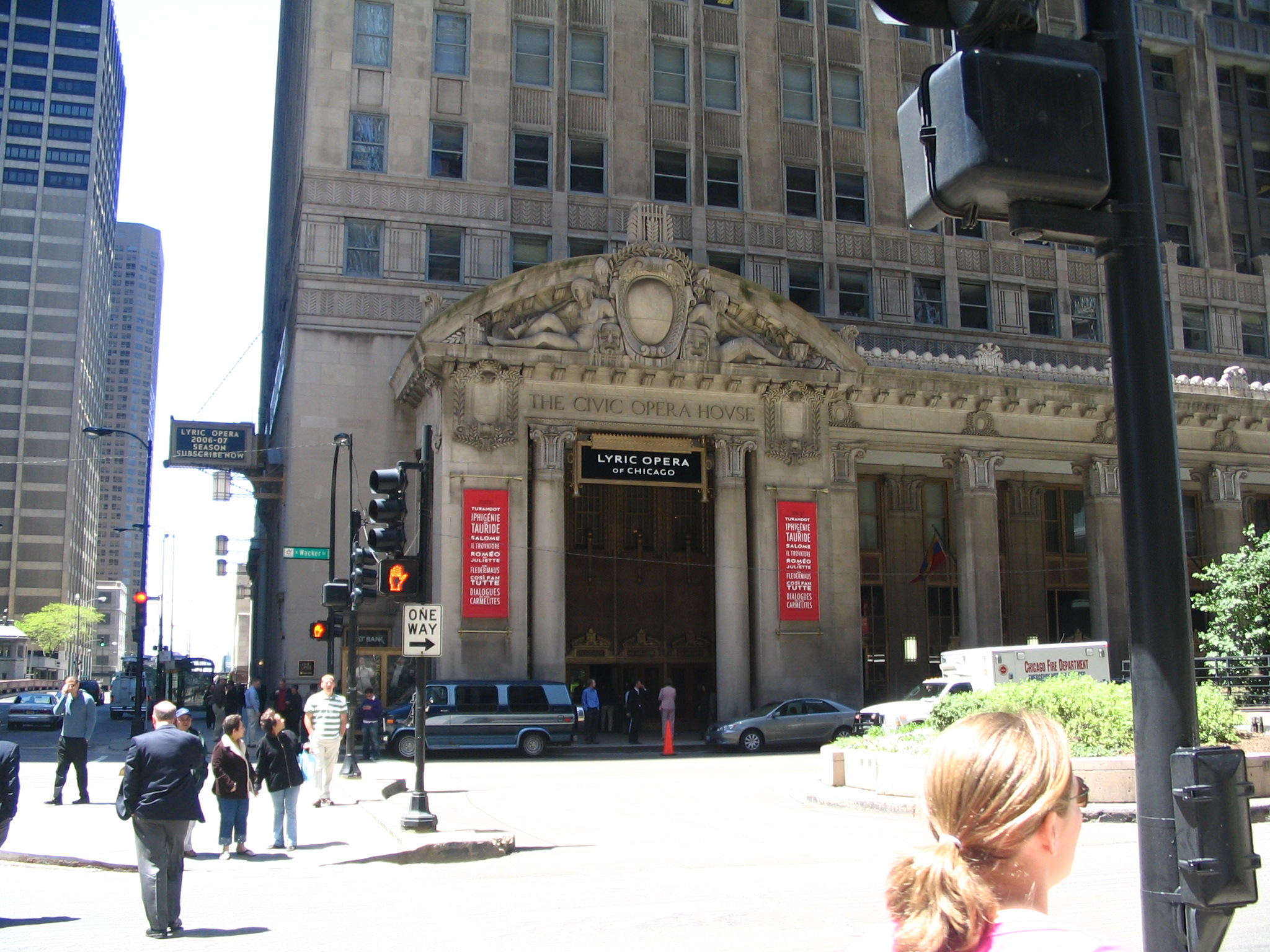
Wacker Drive façade of the Civic Opera House

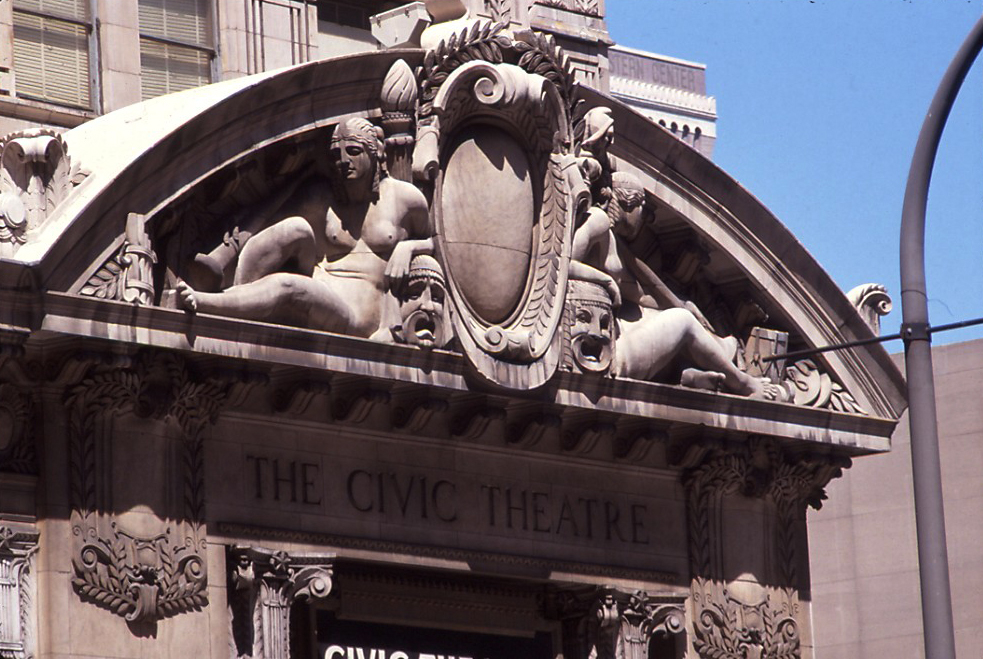
Sculpture by Henry Hering

== History ==
Samuel Insull envisioned and hired the design team for building a new opera house to serve as the home for the Chicago Civic Opera. The building has been seen as being shaped like a huge chair and is sometimes referred to as "Insull's Throne" or "Insull's Folly."

Insull selected the architecture firm Graham, Anderson, Probst & White who were responsible for numerous buildings in the downtown Chicago Loop (including the art deco Merchandise Mart and the former Morton Salt headquarters building next door to the Civic Opera House at 110 N Wacker, constructed in the 1950s). As they did on other occasions, the architects commissioned Henry Hering to produce architectural sculpture for the building. The Indiana limestone used on the exterior was brought from Bedford, Indiana and carved by a team of stone carvers at Ingalls Stone Company under the direction of Harry (Enrico) Liva.

The inaugural season was marked by the première of Camille, a modern opera by 28-year-old Chicago-composer Hamilton Forrest July 15, 1929. It was commissioned by the Civic Opera's prime star and manager, Mary Garden. The opera received mixed reviews and parts of it were broadcast in the Boston area. The Civic Opera is the only house in which the work has ever been performed.

The facility underwent a major renovation in 1993 when Lyric Opera of Chicago purchased the space after years of renting. The chairs were repainted and reupholstered, the carpeting replaced, and the gilt paint completely re-stenciled. The massive project was completed in 1996.

This opera house was the inspiration for the one featured in Orson Welles's film, Citizen Kane. In order for his aspiring opera singer wife to perform, Charles Foster Kane builds an opera house for her, but the quality of her singing reveals her ineptitude. The urban legend is that Samuel Insull built this opera house for his wife, who was not hired by New York's Metropolitan Opera. Variations of this urban legend also often cite that the "chair" represented by the building's architecture faces West, which was intended to be symbolic of Insull turning his back to New York City's Metropolitan Opera from the geographic standpoint of Chicago. The fact, however, is that Samuel Insull's wife was an actress, not an opera singer. A variation on this theme is that it was Insull's daughter who wasn't hired—the problem with this variation is that Insull had no daughters.

== Notable concerts ==
On February 25, 1968, Jimi Hendrix performed two shows with his band The Jimi Hendrix Experience.

== See also ==
- List of opera houses and opera companies in Chicago
- List of tallest buildings in Chicago
