= Business directory =

Printed or web-based listing of businesses by category

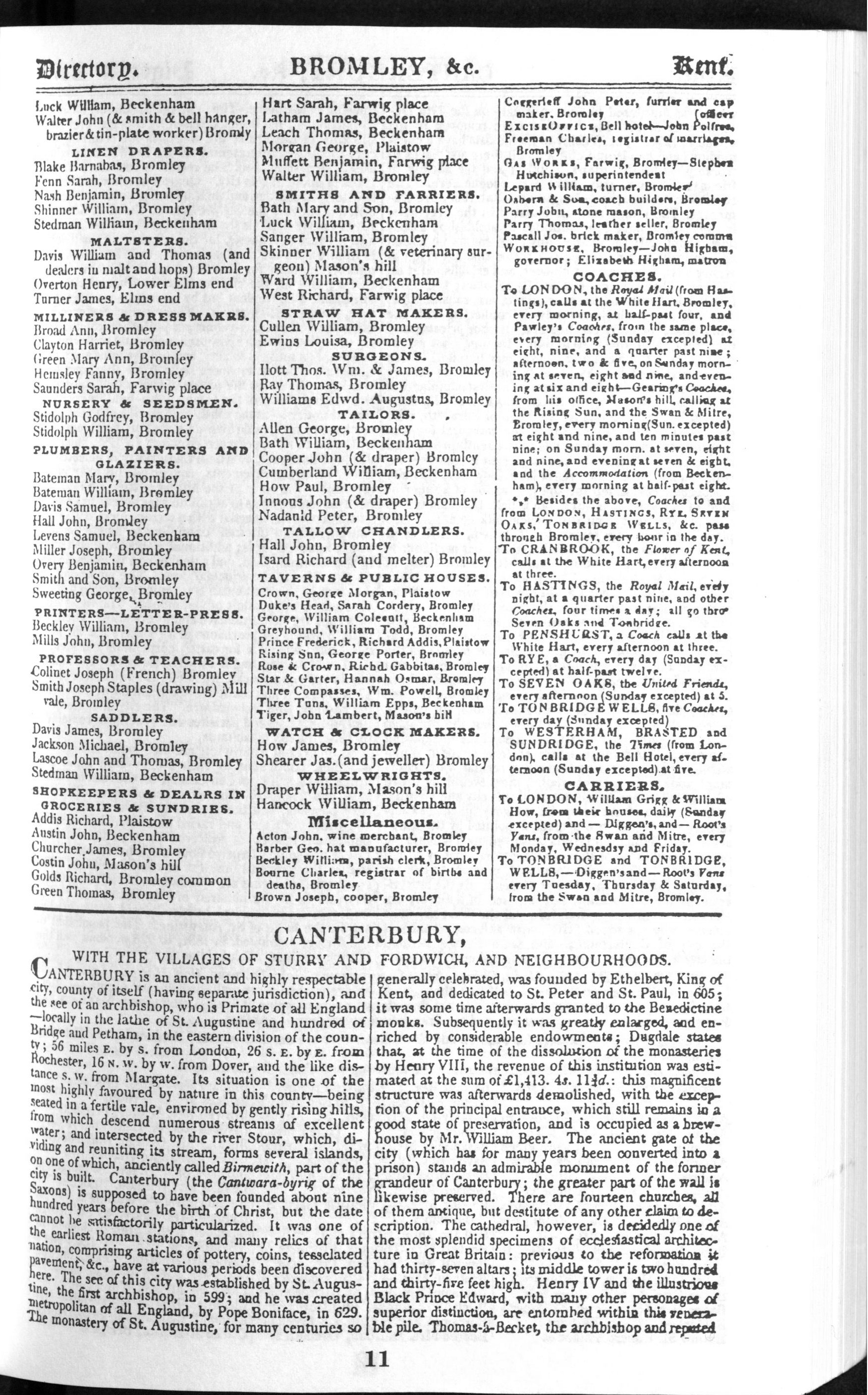
An example page from Pigot's 1839 directory of businesses in the counties of Kent, Surrey and Sussex in England.

An example page from a directory for the city of Macon, 1866

A business directory is a website or printed listing of information which lists businesses within niche-based categories. Businesses can be categorized by niche, location, activity, or size. Business may be compiled either manually or through an automated online search software. Online yellow pages are a type of business directory, as is the traditional phone book.

Some directories include a section for user reviews, comments, and feedback. Business directories in the past would take a printed format but have recently been upgraded to websites due to the advent of the internet.

Many business directories offer complimentary listings in addition to the premium options. There are many business directories and some of these have moved over to the internet and away from printed format. Whilst not being search engines, business directories often have a search function, enabling users to search businesses by Zip Code, country, state, area or city.

== History ==
Previous business directories may have been called 'dictionaries', guides or handbooks.

Historians have linked the development of trade directories such as Kelly's trade directory, Bradshaw's railway timetables and guides and Mitchell's Press Directories to the growth of 'rational, scientific inquiry' and statistics in the nineteenth century.

=== Origins and pre-digital era ===
The origins of the business directory can be traced to the mid-19th-century professional directories, such as The London and Provincial Medical Directory (founded 1847) and Crockford's Clerical Directory (established 1858). On February 21, 1878, the New Haven District Telephone Company in Connecticut issued the world's first telephone directory. It was a single piece of cardboard listing 50 names without any associated telephone numbers, as operators manually connected calls.

The concept of classifying businesses by category, now standard in all directories, emerged in the 1880s. In 1883, a printer in Cheyenne, Wyoming, ran out of white paper and used yellow stock instead, creating the first visual distinction for business listings. Reuben H. Donnelley later formalized this in 1886 by establishing the first official "Yellow Pages" in Chicago, creating a taxonomy of business categories (e.g., locksmiths, plumbers) that would influence data structures for the next century.

Before the World Wide Web, the French Minitel system (launched in 1982) served as the first successful mass-market electronic directory. It allowed millions of users to search for businesses and residents via a computer terminal, precursors to the online directories that would follow a decade later.

=== The Internet directory era (1994–2004) ===
The transition to the internet began with hand-curated directories. Yahoo! Directory, founded in 1994, and the Open Directory Project (DMOZ), founded in 1998, relied on human editors to categorize websites into hierarchical tree structures.

A major technological hurdle during this period was merging business directories with digital maps. In 1995, Zip2 (co-founded by Elon Musk) attempted to place businesses on vector maps. Since digital maps at the time only understood street segments rather than specific street numbers, Zip2 engineers implemented linear interpolation. This mathematical method estimated a business's geographic coordinate by calculating its percentage distance along a known address range (e.g., placing "123 Main St" approximately 23% along the 100–200 block segment).

Early online mapping services like MapQuest (launched in 1996) democratized access to routing but suffered from server-side rendering. Every time a user panned or zoomed the map, the browser had to send a request to the server, which would generate a new custom raster image (GIF or JPEG) and reload the entire page, resulting in a slow and disjointed user experience.

=== Modern local search and mobile (2005–present) ===
The modern era of business directories began in 2005 with the launch of Google Maps, which utilized AJAX (Asynchronous JavaScript and XML) and a quadtree tiling system. This allowed browsers to fetch pre-rendered map tiles in the background, enabling the seamless, draggable "slippy map" that became the industry standard.

Simultaneously, platforms like Yelp (founded in 2004) shifted the focus of directories from static contact details to user-generated reviews and social proof. The introduction of smartphones in 2007 further transformed the technology from geocoding (finding coordinates for an address) to reverse geocoding (identifying the business at a user's GPS coordinates), effectively turning the business directory into a real-time navigation tool.

== Formats ==
Business directories can be in either hard copy or in digital format. Ease of use and distribution means that many trade directories have a digital version.

== See also ==
- Web directory
- List of web directories
- Surplus Record Machinery & Equipment Directory
