= Pigot's Directory =

British business directory

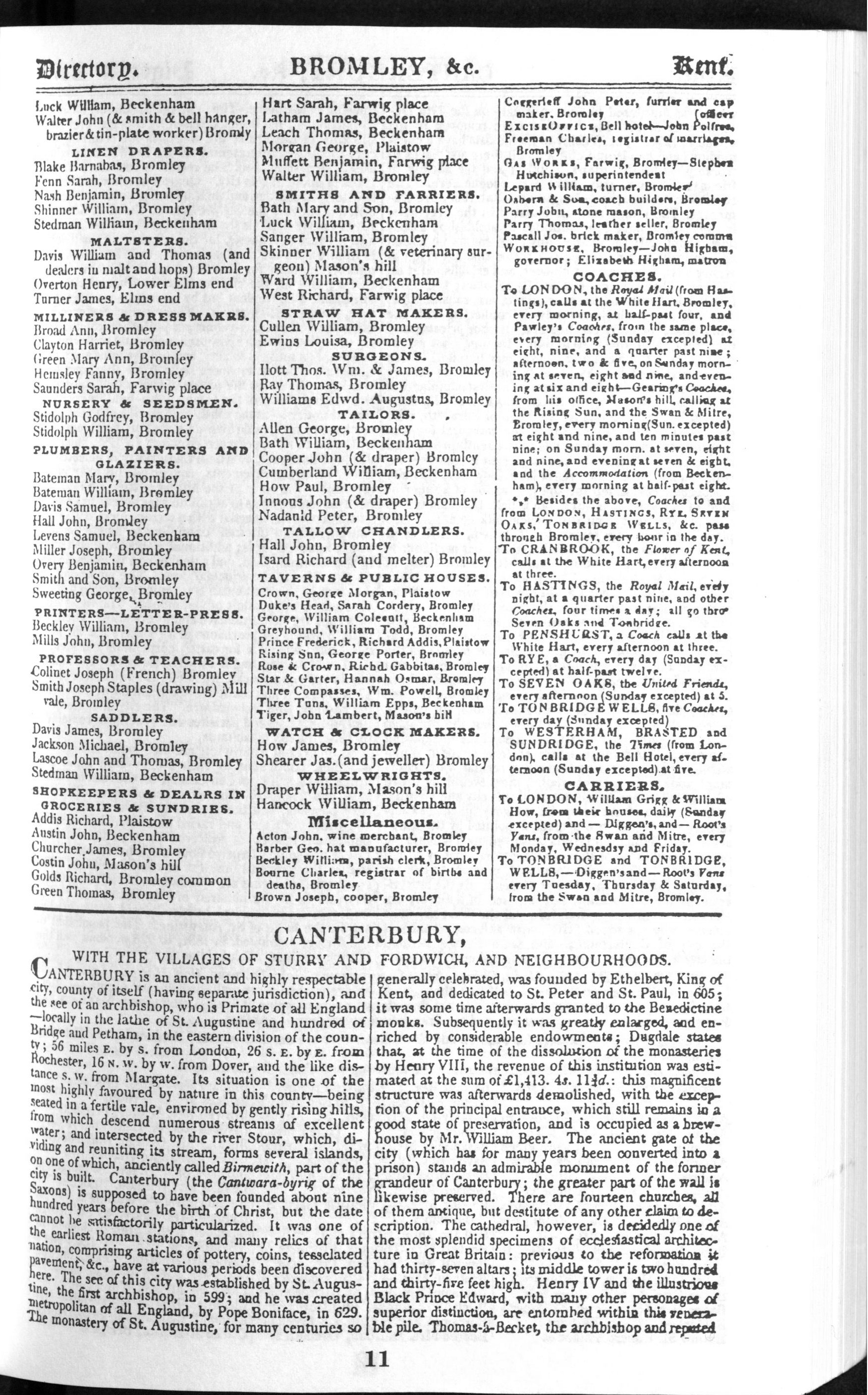
An example page from Pigot's 1839 directory of Kent, Surrey and Sussex. This page has information on Bromley and Canterbury

Pigot's Directory was a major British directory started in 1814 by the publisher James Pigot.

Pigot's Directories covered England, Scotland, and Wales in the period before official Civil registration began and are a valuable source of information regarding all major professions, nobility, gentry, clergy, trades and occupations including taverns and public houses and much more are listed. There are even timetables of the coaches and carriers that served a town.

Parishes are listed for each area with useful information including the number of inhabitants, a geographical description and the main trades and industries of the area or town.

== List of Pigot’s Trade Directories by date ==
- Commercial Directory for 1818-19-20. Manchester: James Pigot. 1818.
- Pigot & Co.'s metropolitan guide & book of reference to every street, court, lane, passage, alley and public building, in the cities of London & Westminster, the borough of Southwark, and their respective suburbs, London: J. Pigot & Co., 1824
- Pigot & Co.'s National Commercial Directory for 1828-9. London: James Pigot. 1828.
- Pigot and Co.'s National Commercial Directory for the Whole of Scotland and of the Isle of Man, ... Manchester, Liverpool, Leeds, Hull, Birmingham, Sheffield, Carlisle, and Newcastle-upon-Tyne, London: J. Pigot & Co., 1837

== List of Pigot’s Trade Directories by geographic coverage ==
- Bedfordshire 1839
- Cambridgeshire 1839
- Cambridgeshire 1830
- Derbyshire 1835
- Durham 1834
- Dyfed 1830 (Cardiganshire, Carmarthenshire and Pembrokeshire)
- Essex 1839
- Herefordshire 1835
- Hertfordshire 1839
- Huntingdonshire 1830
- Huntingdonshire 1839
- Kent 1839
- Leicestershire 1835
- Lincolnshire 1835
- London 1839
- Middlesex 1839
- Monmouthshire 1835
- Norfolk 1839
- North Wales 1835
- Northumberland 1828
- Northumberland 1834
- Nottinghamshire 1835
- Rutlandshire 1835
- Scotland and the Isle of Man (1837)
- Shropshire 1835
- South Wales 1835 (see also Dyfed, above)
- Staffordshire 1835
- Suffolk 1830
- Suffolk 1839
- Surrey 1839
- Sussex 1839
- Sussex 1840
- Warwickshire 1835
- Worcestershire 1835
