= Lea Salonga discography =

Lea Salonga albums discography
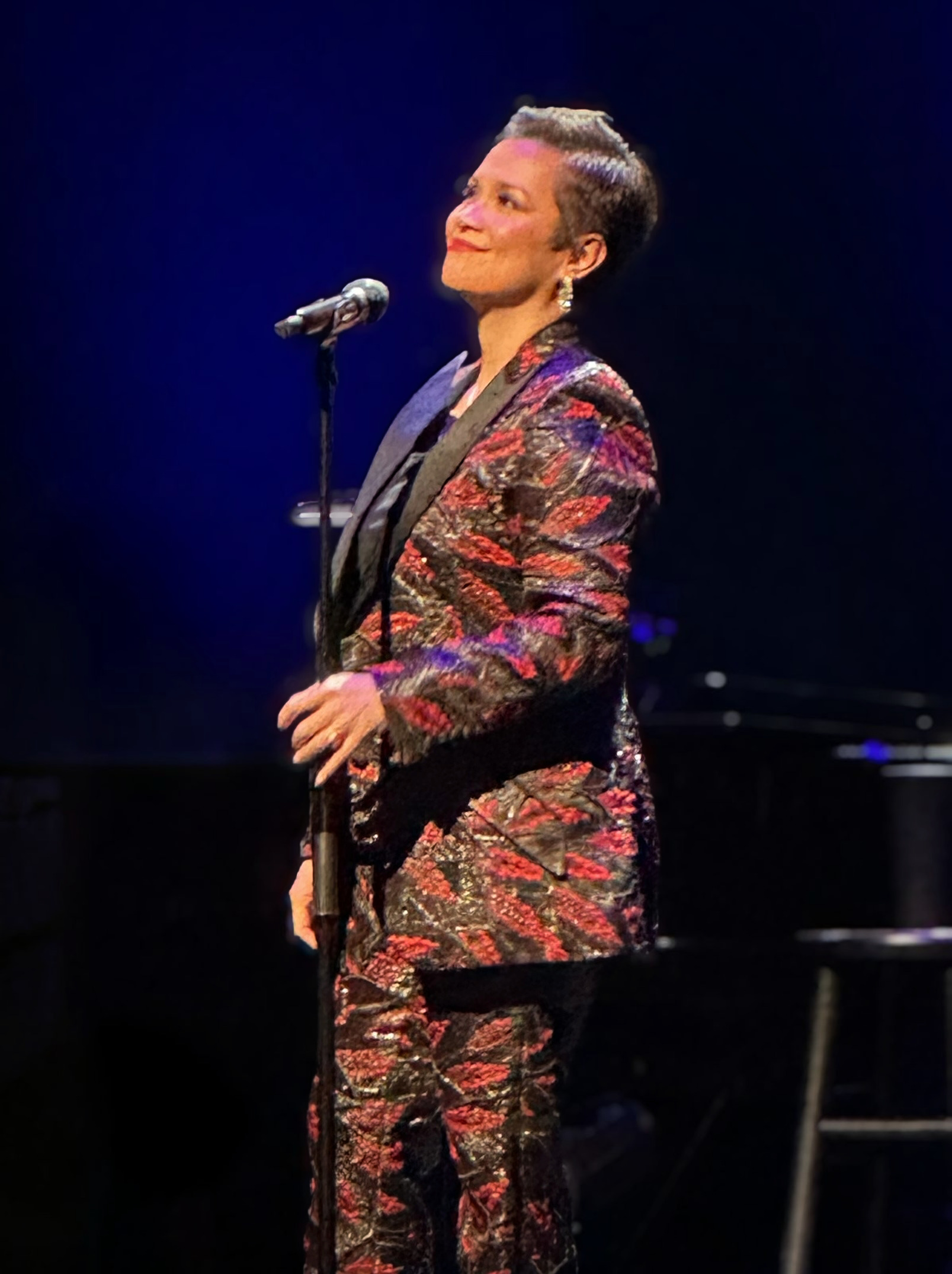
- Salonga in Dallas in 2025
- Studio albums: 12
- Live albums: 6
- Compilation albums: 2

Filipino singer Lea Salonga has released twelve studio albums, six live albums, two compilation albums and is involved in at least ten cast recordings. According to Recording Industry Association of America (RIAA), Salonga has sold 3.5 million certified singles in the United States. At age 10, Salonga recorded her debut album, Small Voice, which was certified Gold in the Philippines. Salonga's 1993 self-titled album made her the first Filipino singer to sign with an international record label.

Salonga is widely recognized as a "Disney Legend" for providing singing voices for two Disney princesses. Through the RIAA, the single "A Girl Worth Fighting For" has been certified Gold, "Reflection" certified Platinum, and "A Whole New World" certified 2× Platinum. She has logged two top 10 albums on Billboard's Classical Crossover Albums chart. In 1990, Salonga scored her first entry on the Official UK Singles chart with "The Last Night Of The World" (a duet with Simon Bowman) peaking at No. 81. In 2008, the Philippine Association of the Record Industry (PARI) honored her with the prestigious Dangal ng Musikang Pilipino award, recognizing her remarkable achievements.

== Albums ==
=== Studio albums ===
Title	Album details	Sales	Certifications
Small Voice	Released: 1981; Label: FGS Records	PHI: 20,000	PARI: Gold
Lea	Released: July 1988; Label: PolyEast Records		
Bakit Labis Kitang Mahal	Released: 1992; Label: PolyEast Records		
Lea Salonga	Released: 1993; Label: Atlantic Records	PHI: 40,000; IDN: 5,000	PARI: Platinum; ASIRI: Gold
I'd Like to Teach the World to Sing	Released: 1997; Label: BMG Records		
By Heart	Released: 1998; Label: BMG Records		
In Love	Released: 1998 (Philippines, US)	PHI: 80,000	PARI: 2× Platinum
Lea Salonga Christmas Album	Released: 2001 (Philippines)		
Songs from the Screen	Released: 2001 (Philippines)		
Inspired	Released: 2007 (Philippines)	PHI: 30,000	PARI: Platinum
Lea Salonga: Your Songs	Released: 2010		
Bahaghari (Rainbow): Lea Salonga Sings Traditional Songs of the Philippines	Released: 2017 (Philippines)		
Sounding Joy	Released: 2024		

=== Live albums ===
Title	Live album details	Sales	Certifications
Lea Salonga Live Vol. 1		PHI: 20,000	PARI: Gold
Lea Salonga Live Vol. 2		PHI: 20,000	PARI: Gold
The Broadway Concert	Released: 2002 (Philippines)		
The Journey So Far – Recorded Live at Cafe Carlyle	Released: 2011 (Philippines, US)		
Blurred Lines Recorded Live at Feinstein's/54 Below (New York City	• Released: 2017 (Philippines, US)		
Live in Concert With The Sydney Symphony Orchestra	Released: 2020 (Philippines, US)		

=== Compilation albums ===
Title	Year	Compilation album details	Ref.
OPM Timeless Collection Gold Series	1997	Released: 1997 (Philippines); Label: OctoArts EMI; Format: CD	
The Story of Lea Salonga: The Ultimate OPM Collection	2001	Released: 2001 (Philippines); Label: EMI Virgin Music; Format: CD, Cassette	
Songs from Home	2004	Label: Musiko Records – MRCD 232, Musiko Records – 82876 64180 2 6; Format: CD, VCD; Country: Philippines; Released: 2004; Genre: Pop	

=== Soundtracks ===
Title	Year	Soundtrack details
Ninja Kids	1986	Original Motion Picture Soundtrack
Aladdin	1992	Original Motion Picture Soundtrack
Mulan	1998	Original Motion Picture Soundtrack
Mulan II	2005	Original Motion Picture Soundtrack
Crazy Ex-Girlfriend: Season 1, Vol. 2	2016	Original Television Soundtrack
Yellow Rose	2020	Original Motion Picture Soundtrack
Centaurworld: S1	2021	Music from the Netflix Original Series
Centaurworld: S2	2021	Soundtrack from the Netflix Series

=== Cast recordings ===
Title	Year	Cast recording details
Miss Saigon	1990	Original London Cast Recording
Little Tramp	1992	Studio Concept Cast Recording
The King and I	1992	Hollywood Studio Cast Recording
Making Tracks	2001	Original Cast Recording
Flower Drum Song	2002	Broadway Revival Cast Recording
Cinderella	2010	Original International Tour Cast Recording
Allegiance	2016	Original Broadway Cast Recording
Once on This Island	2017	New Broadway Cast Recording

== Extended plays ==
Title	Year	Extended play details
Kailan Pa	1985	Released: 1985 (Philippines); Label: Blackgold; Format: Vinyl (7", 45 RPM)
The Last Night Of The World	1990	Released: 1990 (UK); Label: Geffen Records; Format: Vinyl (7", 45 RPM / 12", 45 RPM), CD

== Singles ==
=== As lead artist ===
List of singles as lead artist, showing year(s) released, details, sales, and originating album
Title	Year	Single details	Sales and certifications	Album
"Alphabet Song ('A' You're Adorable)" (with The Bubblegum Kids)	1980	Released: 1980 (Philippines); Label: FGS Records; Format: Vinyl (7", 45 RPM)		Small Voice
"Thank You For The Music"	1980	Released: 1980 (Philippines); Label: FGS Records; Format: Vinyl (7", 45 RPM)		Small Voice
"Someone's Waiting For You"	1980	Released: 1980 (Philippines); Label: FGS Records; Format: Vinyl (7", 45 RPM)		Small Voice
"Rainbow Connection"	1980	Released: 1980 (Philippines); Label: FGS Records; Format: Vinyl (7", 45 RPM)		Small Voice
"I Am But A Small Voice (Ako'y Munting Tinig)"	1981	Released: 1981 (Philippines); Label: FGS Records; Format: Vinyl (7", 45 RPM)		Small Voice
"Tomorrow"	1981	Released: 1981 (Philippines); Label: FGS Records; Format: Vinyl (7", 45 RPM)		Small Voice
"The Last Night Of The World" (with Simon Bowman)	1990	Released: 1990 (UK, Hong Kong, Germany); Label: Geffen Records; Format: Vinyl (7", 45 RPM / 12", 45 RPM), CD		Miss Saigon
"Sun And Moon" (with Simon Bowman)	1990	Released: 1990 (Philippines); Label: Warner Bros. Records; Format: Vinyl (7", 45 RPM)		Miss Saigon
"The Fall Of Saigon" (with Simon Bowman and Peter Polycarpou)	1990	Released: 1990 (Philippines); Label: Warner Bros. Records; Format: Vinyl (7", 45 RPM)		Miss Saigon
"Bakit Labis Kitang Mahal"	1992	Released: 1992 (Philippines); Label: OctoArts International; Format: Vinyl (7", 45 RPM)		Non-album singles
"A Whole New World" (with Jose Mari Chan)	1993	Released: 1993 (Philippines); Label: Walt Disney Records; Format: Vinyl (7", 45 RPM)		Non-album singles
"A Whole New World" (with Brad Kane)	1993	Released: 1993 (Japan); Label: Walt Disney Records; Format: Mini CD	RIAA: 2× Platinum (2,000,000) JPN: Gold (120,000)	Aladdin
"How Wonderful We Are" (with Peabo Bryson)	1995	Released: 1995 (US); Label: Lightyear Entertainment; Format: Cassette, CD		People: A Musical Celebration Of Diversity
"The Last Night Of The World" (with Simon Bowman)	1996	Released: 1996 (Netherlands); Label: Geffen Records; Format: CD		Miss Saigon
"Sariling Awit Natin" (with Sarah Geronimo and Bamboo Mañalac)	2015	Released: 2015 (Philippines); Format: Streaming, digital download		Non-album singles
"We Win As One"	2019	Released: 2019 (Philippines); Format: Streaming, digital download		Non-album singles
"Dream Again"	2020	Released: 2020; Format: Streaming, digital download		Non-album singles

=== Promotional singles ===
List of promotional singles, showing year(s) released, location(s) released in, label, format(s) released in, selected chart positions, certifications, and originating album
Title	Year	Promotional single details	Album	Certification
"The Last Night Of The World" (with Simon Bowman)	1989	Released: 1989 (UK); Label: WEA; Format: Cassette	Miss Saigon	
"The Fall Of Saigon" (with Simon Bowman and The Company)	1990	Released: 1990 (Germany); Label: Geffen Records; Format: CD	Miss Saigon	
"This Is The Hour" (with Keith Burns and The Company)	1990	Released: 1990 (Germany); Label: Geffen Records; Format: CD	Miss Saigon	
"Reflection"	1998	Released: 1998 (US, Japan, Taiwan); Label: Walt Disney Records; Format: Cassette, CD, Mini CD	Mulan	RIAA: Platinum
"Heart of the Filipino" (with Sarah Geronimo and Bamboo Mañalac)	2016	Released: 2016 (Philippines); Label: Not On Label; Format: Streaming, digital download	Non-album singles	
"Bayaning Tunay" (with Various Artists (Note: Ogie Alcasid, Regine Velasquez, Gary Valenciano, Zsa Zsa Padilla, Pops Fernandez, Martin Nievera, Lani Misalucha, Noel Cabangon, Piolo Pascual, Bamboo Mañalac, Ely Beundia, Erik Santos, Christian Bautista, Jed Madela, Nyoy Volante, Angeline Quinto, KZ Tandigan, Morissette, Klarisse, Janine Berdin, Jason Dy, Sam Concepcion, and Lara M))	2021	Released: 2021 (Philippines); Label: Not On Label; Format: Streaming, digital download	Non-album singles	

== Other appearances ==
Title	Year	Country	Label	Album
"If Only"	1985	Philippines	Blackgold Records	Likha: Awit Ng Bata
"We Are the World" (with Children of the World Project (Note: The "Children of the World Project" included 79 children from around the globe: Scotty Alexander, Nabil Ashour, David Atherton, Joseph Baham, Drew Barrymore, Stephanie Block, Danielle Brisebois, Ishmun Brown, Mone Brown, Irwin Bryngelson, David Chan, Kelly Chan, Kristy Chan, Christopher Clark, Jason Cook, Stephanie Dicker, Kristie Douglas, Rashid Duke, Stacy Ferguson, Kim Fields, Jania Foxworth, Todd Garner, Troy Garner, Naomi Gibson, Paul Gimondo, Susan Guzman, Tanya Harrah, Ya'landa Harris, Lauri Hendler, Chelsea Hoffman, Brittany Jackson, Valencia Jackson, Christie Raye Jones, Mike Lawrence, Chris Leach, Lisa Lopez, Martika, Jennifer Mazur, Shalane McCall, Alyssa Milano, Maile Misajon, Katina Morris, West Munz, Heather O'Rourke, Rahsaan Patterson, Danny Pintauro, Michelle Poston, Stevie Real, Patty Reitter, Alfonso Ribeiro, Jason Rodgers, Jonathan Ross, Shavar Ross, Carrie Rudner, Jennifer Ruiz, Gerard Salonga, Lea Salonga, Michael Samaniego, James Sampson, Maria Sanchez, Renee Sands, Steven Sawaya, Glenn Scarpelli, Jerry Sharell, Nicole Shelley, Quinzelle Swayne, Teri Tobin, Tammy Townsend, Laura Trimas, Veronique Vicari, Gina Vinaccia, David Wagner, Priscilla Weems, Angela White, Christopher White, Nicole Williams, Zeke Williams, Shanice Wilson, and Rochelle Yoshida.))	1985	US, Japan	Starborn Records & Tapes, SMS Records	Non-album single
"Please Naman"	1989	Philippines	OctoArts International	OctoArts Pilipino Music 2
"Only You"	1990	Philippines	OctoArts International	OPM Hit Series
"The Last Night Of The World" (with Simon Bowman)	1990	US	Geffen Records	A Musical History Of The Decade 1980-1990: Vol. 4
"Mula Noon, Hanggang Ngayon"	1992	Philippines	OctoArts International	Hitmasters 2
"It's Just Goodbye"	1993	US	Atlantic	Knock Out Sampler
"We Could Be In Love" (with Brad Kane)	1993	Canada	Warner Music Canada	Warner Music Canada: Vol. 189
"Bakit Labis Kitang Mahal"	1993	Philippines	OctoArts International	OPM Hit Series 7
"Nandito Ako"	1993	Philippines	Octo Arts International	OPM Hit Revivals 2
"Nandito Ako"	1993	Philippines	Octo Arts International	OPM Hit Series 8
"We Could Be In Love" (with Brad Kane)	1994	Hungary	Warner Music Hungary	Bravo Hits 2
"We Could Be In Love" (with Brad Kane)	1994	UK	Fine Tunes	Hit & Run Music 3
"One Earth" (with Bill Shontz)	1994	US	Lightyear Entertainment	Greatest Hits!
"A Whole New World" (with Brad Kane)	1994	US, Australia, Singapore	Walt Disney Records	Disney's Award Winning Classics
"A Whole New World" (with Brad Kane)	1994	US	Walt Disney Records	Musical Classics Sampler
"A Whole New World" (with Brad Kane)	1995	US	Walt Disney Records	Classic Disney Volume I (60 Years Of Musical Magic)
"A Whole New World" (with Brad Kane)	1995	US, UK, Denmark, Norway	Walt Disney Records	Classics 1
"A Whole New World" (with Brad Kane)	1995	US, Canada	Walt Disney Records	And The Winner Is... A Collection Of Honored Disney Classic Songs
"A Whole New World" (with Brad Kane)	1995	US, Canada, Brazil	Walt Disney Records	Disney's Princess Collection
"A Whole New World" (with Brad Kane)	1995	Canada	Madacy Music Group	The Best Of Today's Movie Hits: Disc 1
"A Whole New World" (with Brad Kane)	1995	US	Rhino Records	The Envelope Please... Academy Award Winning Songs (1934-1993): Vol. 5
"How Wonderful We Are" (with Peabo Bryson)	1995	US	Pro Audio USA	Hit Trax X151
"讓你的生命裡有我" (with 王傑)	1995	Taiwan	Warner Music Taiwan	The UFO / Warner CD Sampler Vol. 24 1995 / 11
"The Journey (Remix)"	1995	US	Pro Audio USA	Hit Trax X134
"We Could Be In Love" (with Brad Kane)	1996	Malaysia	WEA	A Gift Of Love
"We Could Be In Love" (with Brad Kane)	1996	Taiwan	WEA	The Wedding Album
"Liman-Dipang Tao"	1996	Philippines	Musiko Records	The Silver Album
"Liman-Dipang Tao"	1996	Philippines	BMG Records	The Silver Album: Minus One
"Paraiso"	1996	Philippines	Musiko Records	The Silver Album
"Paraiso"	1996	Philippines	BMG Records	The Silver Album: Minus One
"A Whole New World" (with Brad Kane)	1996	US	Rhino Records	Tim Rice Collection: Stage and Screen Classics
"A Whole New World" (with Brad Kane)	1996	US	Rhino Records	The Envelope Please... Academy Award Winning Songs: Vol. 5 (1982-1993)
"A Whole New World" (with Brad Kane)	1996	US, Mexico	Walt Disney Records	Disney's Hero Song, Vol. 3
"A Whole New World" (with Brad Kane)	1997	Canada	Walt Disney Records	Disney's Hero Song, Vol. 3
"A Whole New World" (with Brad Kane)	1997	US	Walt Disney Records	Classic Disney Collection: 60 Years Of Musical Magic
"We Could Be In Love" (with Brad Kane)	1997	Taiwan	Warner Music Taiwan	100% Love Songs
"Narration with Music" (Note: Narrator) (with the Russian Federation State Symphony Orchestra)	1997			Tchaikovsky: The Nutcracker (Suite, Op. 71a)
"Ngayon Pa Lang, Tagumpay Ka Na" (with Cris Villonco)	1997	Philippines	Musiko Records	One Smile At A Time
"Reflection"	1998	Malaysia	Sony Music	花木蘭 Mulan
"Reflection"	1998	US, Canada	Walt Disney Records	Disney's Princess Collection Vol. 2
"A Whole New World" (with Brad Kane)	1998	Italy	Walt Disney Records	La Magia Disney In Musica
"Honor To Us All" (with Beth Fowler and Marni Nixon)	1998	US	Walt Disney Records	Disney's 75 Years Of Music & Memories
"I Don't Love You Anymore" (with Ariel Rivera)	1999			Aawitin Ko Na Lang
"Friend Of Mine"	1999	Indonesia	Ariola	Passion 2
"A Whole New World" (with Brad Kane)	2000	Italy	Walt Disney Records	Disney 2000
"A Whole New World" (with Brad Kane)	2001	US	Walt Disney Records	Disney's Greatest: Volume 1
"A Whole New World" (with Brad Kane)	2001	US	Walt Disney Records	Disney's Greatest Volume 1 & 2
"Reflection"	2001	US	Walt Disney Records	Disney's Greatest Volume 1
"Reflection"	2001	US	Walt Disney Records	Disney's Greatest Volume 1 & 2
"Reflection"	2001	US	Walt Disney Records	Disney's Princess Favorites
"I Have Dreamed" (with Peabo Bryson)	2001	US	Philips	Greatest Hits
"I Have Dreamed" (with Peabo Bryson)	2002	US	Not On Label	Richard Rodgers 2002 Centennial
"Friend Of Mine"	2002	Taiwan	Warner Music Taiwan	愛是唯 一 Love Is The Answer
"A Whole New World" (with Brad Kane)	2002	UK	Walt Disney Records	Disney's Princess Collection
"Reflection"	2002	UK	Walt Disney Records	Disney's Princess Collection
"When October Goes"	2003			Dream: The Lyrics and Music of Johnny Mercer
"We Could Be In Love" (with Brad Kane)	2003	China	Tone Music	Love Diary
"Mula Noon, Hanggang Ngayon"	2003	Philippines	EMI	EMI 25th Silver Anniversary OPM Collection
"Mula Noon, Hanggang Ngayon"	2003	Southeast Asia	Not On Label	New OPM Music Hits List
"If You Can Dream" (with Susan Stevens Logan, Christie Houser, Jodi Benson, Paige O'Hara, and Judy Kuhn)	2004			Disney Princess: The Ultimate Song Collection
"Pie Jesu" (with Daniel Rodriguez)	2005	US	Blix Street Records	In The Presence
"Panis Angelicus" (with Daniel Rodriguez)	2005	US	Blix Street Records	In The Presence
"Via Dolorosa"	2005			Stand Ye Steady: Songs of Courage and Inspiration
"A Whole New World" (with Brad Kane)	2005	US	Walt Disney Records	Julie Andrews Selects Her Favorite Disney Songs
"A Whole New World" (with Brad Kane)	2006	UK, Australia	Walt Disney Records	The Best Disney Album In The World ...Ever!
"Reflection"	2006	UK, Australia	Walt Disney Records	The Best Disney Album In The World ...Ever!
"Pie Jesu" (with Daniel Rodriguez)	2006	US	Springtime of Faith	Pope John Paul II: The Tribute Album
"All Of You (Tagalog)"	2006	Philippines	Columbia, Burgundy Records	Romantic Classics
"If You Can Dream" (with Susan Stevens Logan, Christie Houser, Jodi Benson, Paige O'Hara, and Judy Kuhn)	2008	UK, Europe	Walt Disney Records	Disneygirl
"A Whole New World" (with Brad Kane)	2008	Malaysia	Walt Disney Records	Disney Greatest Musicals
"Reflection"	2008	Malaysia	Walt Disney Records	Disney Greatest Musicals
"A Whole New World" (with Brad Kane)	2008	UK, Australia, Brazil, Malaysia, Indonesia	Walt Disney Records	Disney Greatest Love Songs
"Reflection"	2008	UK, Australia, Brazil, Malaysia, Indonesia	Walt Disney Records	Disney Greatest Love Songs
"The Last Night Of The World" (with Simon Bowman)	2008	Sweden	Absolute	Absolute Musicals
"A Whole New World" (with Brad Kane)	2008	UK	Virgin	101 Songs From The Musicals
"A Whole New World" (with Brad Kane)	2009	Malaysia	Walt Disney Records	The Essential Disney Love Song Collection
"A Whole New World" (with Brad Kane)	2009	UK, Italy, Spain, Denmark, Indonesia	Walt Disney Records	The Magic of Disney
"Tell Me"	2009	Philippines	PolyEast Records	All About Joey
"I Have Dreamed" (with Peabo Bryson)	2009	Hungary	Universal Music Group	Musical Szerelem: A Broadway Legszebb Szerelmes Dalai
"Bakit Labis Kitang Mahal"	2010	Philippines	PolyEast Records	Timeless: The OPM Memories
"Look (a Rainbow)"	2010			Live
"A Whole New World" (with Brad Kane)	2011	UK	Walt Disney Records	Now That's What I Call Disney!
"On My Own"	2011	Poland	Pomaton EMI	The Best Musicals... Ever!
"Promise Me"	2011	Philippines	Ivory Music & Video, Sony Music Entertainment	Pinoy Senti Hits
"A Whole New World" (with Brad Kane)	2012	Mexico	Walt Disney Records	Love by Disney
"Reflection"	2012	Mexico	Walt Disney Records	Love by Disney
"A Whole New World" (with Brad Kane)	2012	US	Walt Disney Records	Now That's What I Call Disney, Vol. 1
"Reflection"	2012	US	Walt Disney Records	Now That's What I Call Disney, Vol. 1
"A Whole New World" (with Brad Kane)	2013	US, Canada, UK, Australia, Brazil	Walt Disney Records	Disney Classics
"Reflection"	2013	US, Canada, UK, Australia, Brazil	Walt Disney Records	Disney Classics
"I Still Believe" (with Claire Moore)	2013	Germany	Universal Music Group	Best Of Musical
"A Whole New World" (with Brad Kane)	2013	US	Walt Disney Records	Now That's What I Call Disney Princess
"Reflection"	2013	US	Walt Disney Records	Now That's What I Call Disney Princess
"A Whole New World" (with Brad Kane)	2014	Europe	Walt Disney Records	Now That's What I Call Disney!
"Reflection"	2014	Europe	Walt Disney Records	Now That's What I Call Disney!
"A Whole New World" (with Brad Kane)	2014	Canada, Australia	Universal Music	Disney Icon Volume 1
"Somewhere" (with Mitoy Yonting)	2014	Philippines	MCA Music	Hanggang Wakas
"Can You Feel the Love Tonight" (with Il Divo)	2014	Europe	Columbia, Syco Music	A Musical Affair: Live in Japan
"Memory" (with Il Divo)	2014	Europe	Columbia, Syco Music	A Musical Affair: Live in Japan
"The Music of the Night" (with Il Divo)	2014	Europe	Columbia, Syco Music	A Musical Affair: Live in Japan
"Time to Say Goodbye (Con te partirò)" (with Il Divo)	2014	Europe	Columbia, Syco Music	A Musical Affair: Live in Japan
"A Whole New World" (with Il Divo)	2014	Europe	Columbia, Syco Music	A Musical Affair: Live in Japan
"Nandito Ako"	2014	Philippines	PolyEast Records	OPM Throwback - The Best Of OPM Favorites
"A Whole New World" (with Brad Kane)	2015	Norway	Walt Disney Records	Disney's Beste
"A Whole New World" (with Brad Kane)	2015	Sweden	Walt Disney Records	Disney's Bästa
"A Whole New World" (with Il Divo)	2016	Thailand	Sony Music	#Love - Yes I Do
"Reflection"	2016	US	Walt Disney Records	Dream Big, Princess
"A Whole New World" (with Brad Kane)	2017	UK	Walt Disney Records	Classic Disney
"Reflection"	2017	UK	Walt Disney Records	Classic Disney
"A Whole New World" (with Brad Kane)	2018	US, Europe	Walt Disney Records	Disney Ultimate Hits
"Reflection"	2018	US, Europe	Walt Disney Records	Disney Ultimate Hits
"A Whole New World" (with Brad Kane)	2018	Europe	Walt Disney Records	Disney: The Platinum Collection Volume 2
"A Whole New World" (with Brad Kane)	2019	Canada	Walt Disney Records	Disney Icon Love Songs
"A Girl Worth Fighting For" (with Harvey Fierstein)	2019	Japan	Walt Disney Records	Super Friendship!: Disney Music Collection
"A Whole New World" (with Brad Kane)	2020	Europe	Walt Disney Records	Disney Sing-Along: Disney Classics
"Christmas In Our Hearts" (with Pentatonix)	2022		RCA Records	Holidays Around the World
"The Most Wonderful Time of the Year" "Payapang Daigdig" "Christmas Together Melody: Sleigh Ride / I'll Be Home for Christmas / O Holy Night" "Angels from the Realms of Glory" (with The Tabernacle Choir at Temple Square)	2023	USA	Intellectual Reserve, Inc.	Season of Light
