= List of awards and nominations received by Lea Salonga =

Lea Salonga awards and nominations
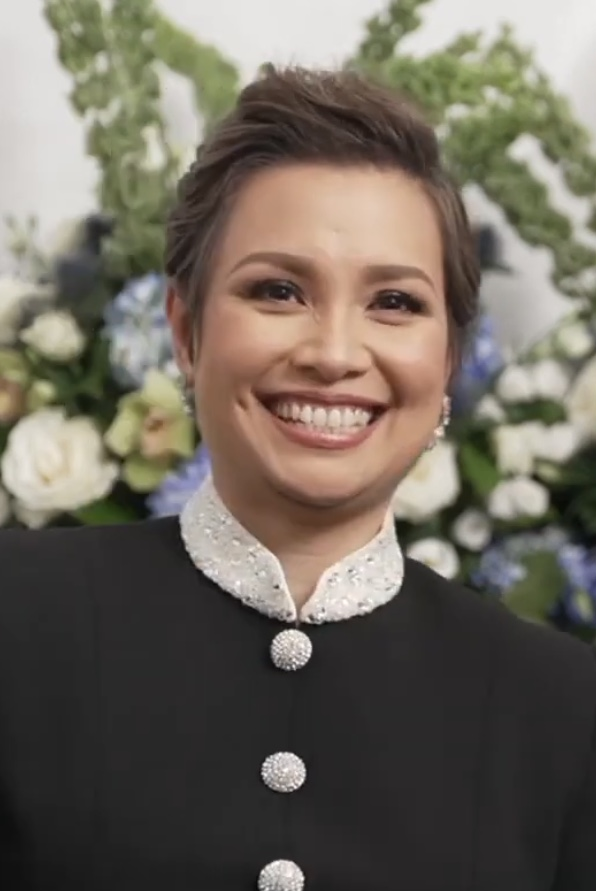
- Salonga at the 74th Tony Awards in 2021
Awards and nominations
Award	Wins	Nominations
Aliw Awards	15	18
Box Office Entertainment Awards	1	1
Broadway.com Audience Awards	0	3
BroadwayWorld Awards	1	1
BroadwayWorld Theater Fans Choice Awards	1	1
BroadwayWorld LA Awards	0	1
Craig Noel Awards	0	1
Disney Legends Awards	1	1
Drama Desk Awards	1	1
Drama League Awards	0	2
FAMAS Awards	1	3
Gawad Urian Awards	0	1
Grammy Awards	0	2
Laurence Olivier Awards	1	1
MTV Asia Awards	0	1
Outer Critics Circle Awards	1	1
Ovation Awards	0	1
PMPC Star Awards for Music	3	3
Theatre World Awards	1	1
Tony Awards	1	1
WOS Awards	1	1

Totals (Note: Certain award groups do not simply award one winner. They acknowledge several different recipients, have runners-up, and have third place. Since this is a specific recognition and is different from losing an award, runner-up mentions are considered wins in this award tally. For simplification and to avoid errors, each award in this list has been presumed to have had a prior nomination.)
- Wins: 29
- Nominations: 46

In 1991, she became the first Asian actress to win a Tony Award for her performance as Kim in the original Broadway production of Miss Saigon, following her win at the 1990 Laurence Olivier Awards for the same role. She has become one of the most awarded performers at the Aliw Awards with 18 nominations and 15 wins, including 3 consecutive wins for Best Child Performer. In 2005, she was awarded the Golden Artist Award at the FAMAS Awards. She has received 2 Grammy nominations for Best Musical Theater Album (2004 and 2019).

In 1990, Salonga was awarded the Presidential Medal of Merit from President Corazon Aquino for her services to the arts. In 2007, President Gloria Arroyo honored Salonga with the rank of Commander of the Order of Lakandula in recognition of using her talents to benefit Philippine society and foster cultural exchange. The House of Representatives of the Philippines also awarded her with the Congressional Medal of Achievement for showing "the extent and depth of the Filipino musical talent" and "opening the way for other Filipino artists to break into the finest theaters in the world."

== Awards and nominations ==
Award	Year (Note: Indicates the year of ceremony. Each year is linked to the article about the awards held that year, wherever possible.)	Category	Recipient(s) or work	Result	Ref.
Aliw Awards	1980	Best Child Performer	Herself	Won	
Aliw Awards	1981	Best Child Performer	Herself	Won	
Aliw Awards	1982	Best Child Performer	Herself	Won	
Aliw Awards	1990	Outstanding Performer	Herself	Won	
Aliw Awards	2004	Entertainer of th	Herself	Won	
Aliw Awards	2005	Best Major Concert (Female)	Herself	Nominated	
Aliw Awards	2005	Best Actress in a Musical	Baby	Nominated	
Aliw Awards	2008	Best Major Concert (Female)	Herself	Won	
Aliw Awards	2012	Best Collaboration in a Concert	Herself	Won	
Aliw Awards	2016	Best Major Concert (Foreign Venue)	Herself	Won	
Aliw Awards	2016	Entertainer of the Year	Herself	Won	
Aliw Awards	2018	Best Major Concert (Female)	Herself	Won	
Aliw Awards	2018	Entertainer of the Year	Herself	Won	
Aliw Awards	2019	People's Choice Award	Herself	Won	
Aliw Awards	2019	Best Actress in a Musical	Sweeney Todd	Won	
Aliw Awards	2020	Best Major Concert (Female)	Herself	Won	
Aliw Awards	2024	Best Lead Actress in a Play	Request sa Radyo	Nominated	
Aliw Awards	2024	Best Major Concert (Female)	Stage, Screen, & Everything In Between	Won	
Box Office Entertainment Awards	2020	Female Concert Performer of the Year	Herself	Won	
Broadway.com Audience Awards	2016	Best Leading Actress in a Musical	Allegiance	Nominated	
Broadway.com Audience Awards	2018	Featured Actress in a Musical	Once on This Island	Nominated	
Broadway.com Audience Awards	2018	Featured Diva Performance	Once on This Island	Nominated	
BroadwayWorld Awards	2016	Best Leading Actress in a Musical	Allegiance	Won	
BroadwayWorld Theater Fans Choice Awards	2018	Best Leading Actress in a Musical	Allegiance	Won	
BroadwayWorld LA Awards	2018	Best Actress in a Musical	Annie	Nominated	
Craig Noel Awards	2012	Outstanding Featured Performance by a Female in a Musical	Allegiance	Nominated	
Disney Legends Awards	2011	Animation—Voice	Aladdin and Mulan	Won	
Drama Desk Awards	1991	Outstanding Actress in a Musical	Miss Saigon	Won	
Drama League Awards	2003	Distinguished Performance	Flower Drum Song	Nominated	
Drama League Awards	2025	Distinguished Performance	Stephen Sondheim's Old Friends	Nominated	
FAMAS Awards	1982	Best Child Actress	Tropang Bulilit	Nominated	
FAMAS Awards	1996	Best Actress	Sana Maulit Muli	Nominated	
FAMAS Awards	2005	Golden Artist Award	Herself	Won	
Gawad Urian Awards	1996	Best Actress (Tagalog: Pinakamahusay na Pangunahing Aktres)	Sana Maulit Muli	Nominated	
Grammy Awards	2004	Best Musical Show Album	Flower Drum Song	Nominated	
Grammy Awards	2019	Best Musical Theater Album	Once on This Island	Nominated	
Laurence Olivier Awards	1990	Outstanding Performance of the Year by an Actress in a Musical	Miss Saigon	Won	
MTV Asia Awards	2002	Favorite Artist Philippines	Herself	Nominated	
Outer Critics Circle Awards	1991	Outstanding Actress in a Musical	Miss Saigon	Won	
Ovation Awards	2002	Leading Actress in a Musical	Flower Drum Song	Nominated	
PMPC Star Awards for Music	2012	Natatanging Alagad ng Musika Special Award	Herself	Won	
PMPC Star Awards for Music	2014	Female Concert Performer of the Year	Herself	Won	
PMPC Star Awards for Music	2019	Concert of the Year	The 40th Anniversary Concert	Won	
Theatre World Awards	1991	Best Actress in a Musical	Miss Saigon	Won	
Tony Awards	1991	Best Performance by an Actress in a Musical	Miss Saigon	Won	
WOS Awards	2011	Best Ensemble Performance	Les Misérables in Concert: The 25th Anniversary	Won	

== Other accolades ==
=== Cultural honors ===
Name of the honor, year the honor was awarded, category and type of honor
Honor	Year	Category	Type	Ref.
Aliw Awards	2019	Hall of Fame	Honoree	
Better Chinatown Association	2000	Asian American Heritage Award	Honoree	
Disney Legends	2011	Hall of Fame	Honoree	
Drama League Awards	2025	Distinguished Achievement in Musical Theater	Honoree	
Eastwood City Walk of Fame	2006	Walk of Fame	Honoree	
Gold House	2020	A100 List Judge	Honoree	
Gold House	2021	A100 List Judge	Honoree	
Gold House	2022	A100 List Judge	Honoree	
Gold House	2023	Gold Legend Honor	Honoree	
Gusi Peace Prize	2009	Performing Arts	Honoree	
Hollywood Walk of Fame	2026	Walk of Fame	Honoree	
Myx Music Awards	2013	Myx Magna Award	Honoree	
PICC Gem Awards	2016	World-Class Excellence and Global Reach	Honoree	
PMPC Star Awards for Music	2014	Pilita Corales Lifetime Achievement Award	Honoree	
Time100 Impact Awards	2022	Life-Long Role Model for Children of Color	Honoree	
TOFA-NY Heritage Awards	2011	Outstanding Filipino-Americans' Heritage Award	Honoree	
TOFA-NY Heritage Awards	2020	Outstanding Filipino-Americans' Heritage Award	Honoree	
United Nations FAO	2010	UN Goodwill Ambassador in Fight Against Global Hunger	Honoree	
World Vision	2009	Ambassador for Child Sponsorship	Honoree	
Youth & United Nations Global Alliance	2021	YUNGA Ambassador	Honoree	

=== State honors ===
Name of country, year given, and name of honor
Country	Year	Honor	Ref.
Philippines	1990	Presidential Medal of Merit	
Philippines	2007	Commander of the Order of Lakandula	
Philippines	2007	Congressional Medal of Achievement	

=== World records ===
Name of record body, year the record was awarded, name of the record, and the name of the record holder
Publication	Year	World records	Record holder	Ref.
Guinness World Records	1991	Greatest advance sales for a musical	Miss Saigon	
