= Lea Salonga =

Filipino actress and singer (born 1971)

Lea Salonga CL
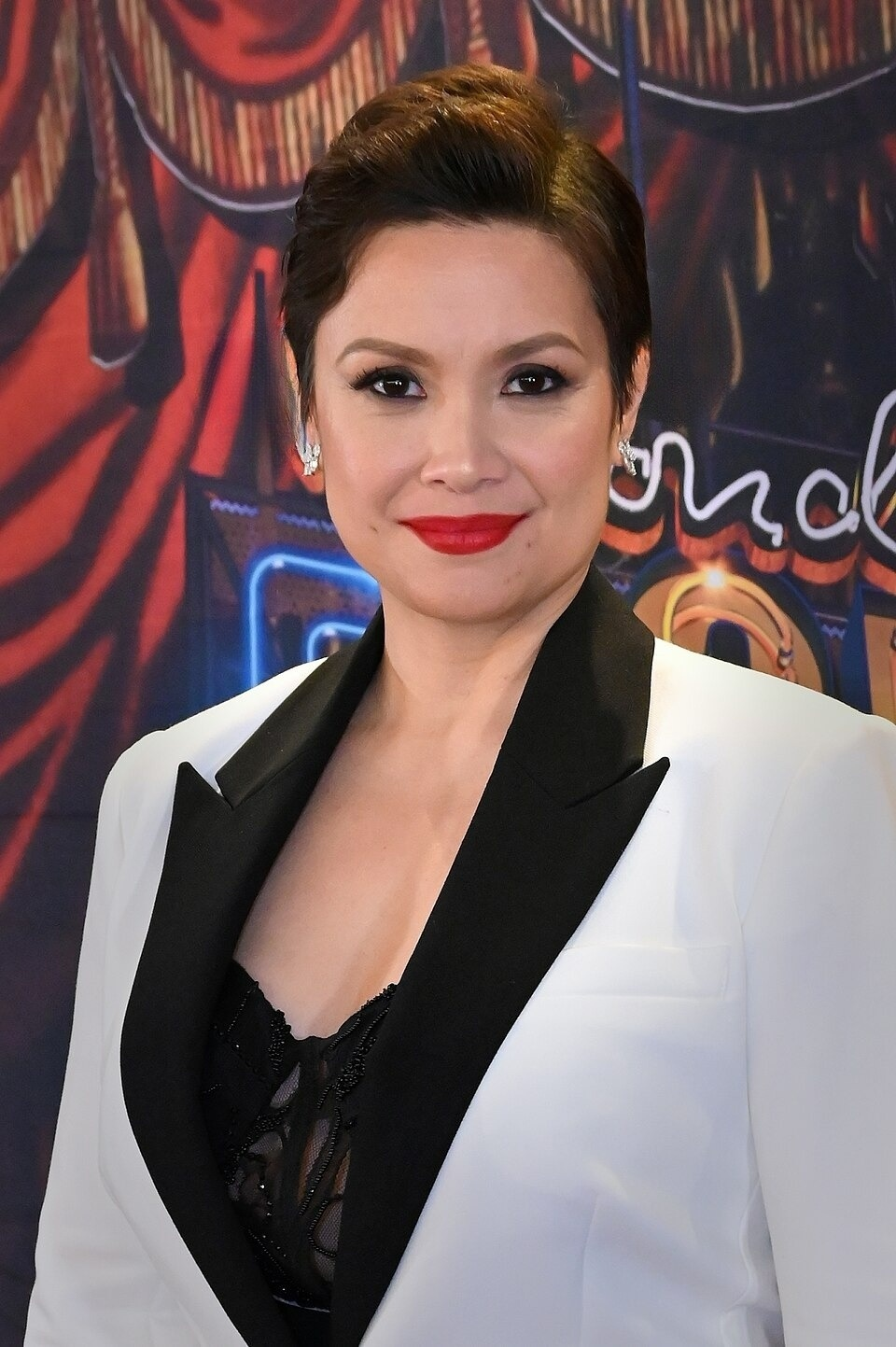
- Salonga in 2025
- Born: Maria Lea Carmen Imutan Salonga; February 22, 1971 (age 55); Manila, Philippines
- Occupations: Actress; singer
- Years active: 1978–present
- Works: Discography; screen and stage
- Spouse: Robert Chien (m. 2004, separated)
- Children: Nic Chien
- Relatives: Gerard Salonga (brother); Maniya Barredo (cousin); Shay Mitchell (cousin)
- Awards: Full list
- Honors: Presidential Merit Award; Order of Lakandula
- Musical career
- Genres: OPM; pop; musical theatre
- Instrument: Vocals
- Labels: Atlantic; Arista; Capitol; EMI Philippines; Sony Music Philippines; WEA; Walt Disney
- Website: leasalonga.com

Maria Lea Carmen Imutan Salonga (Note: English: /ˈleɪə səˈlɒŋɡə/ LAY-ə sa-LONG-ə; Filipino: [ˈlɛ.a saˈloŋga]) (born February 22, 1971) is a Filipino singer and actress. Known as the "Pride of the Philippines", she has headlined Broadway and West End productions, appeared on international television and film, and released albums of her work.

Salonga began performing in Philippine musical theatre as a child, making her professional debut at age seven. She achieved international recognition in 1989 when she originated the role of Kim in the West End production of Miss Saigon, later reprising the role on Broadway in 1991. She earned critical success for her performances in Les Misérables (1993, 2007) and Flower Drum Song (2002–2003). On film, she was praised for her performances in Bakit Labis Kitang Mahal (1992) and Sana Maulit Muli (1995), and she provided the singing voices for Princess Jasmine in Aladdin (1992) and Fa Mulan in Mulan (1998) and Mulan II (2004). She has also appeared on television in That's Entertainment, As the World Turns, and Pretty Little Liars, and served as a coach on The Voice of the Philippines as well as its spin-off series The Voice Kids and The Voice Teens.

As a recording artist, Salonga began her career at age ten with the Gold-certified album Small Voice (1981). She then later signed with Atlantic Records and released the album Lea Salonga (1993), which achieved Platinum status, followed by I'd Like to Teach the World to Sing (1997) and By Heart (1999). She has released two holiday albums, The Christmas Album (2000) and Sounding Joy (2024). Salonga has performed concerts at notable international venues, including Carnegie Hall, Lincoln Center, the London Palladium, the Nippon Budokan, the Royal Albert Hall, and the Sydney Opera House.

Salonga's major accolades include a Laurence Olivier Award (1990), Tony Award (1991), and two Grammy Award nominations (2004, 2019). In the Philippines, she has received 15 Aliw Awards (1980–2024) and has been inducted into the Hall of Fame, along with receiving a FAMAS Award (2005), and a star on the Eastwood City Walk of Fame (2006). Salonga has also been recognized by the Philippine government for her cultural contributions, receiving the Presidential Merit Award in 1990 and the Congressional Medal of Achievement in 2007, and being appointed Commander of the Order of Lakandula in the same year. Salonga also became a Disney Legend in 2011. She is the first Asian actress to win a Tony Award, and in 2026, became the first Filipino to receive a star on the Hollywood Walk of Fame.

== Life and career ==
=== 1971–1989: Early life and career beginnings ===
Maria Lea Carmen Imutan Salonga was born on February 22, 1971, in Manila, Philippines, to Maria Ligaya Alcantara Imutan (b. 1937) and Feliciano Genuino Salonga Jr. (1929–2016), a rear admiral in the Philippine Coast Guard Auxiliary and chairman of the Subic Bay Metropolitan Authority. Genealogical research presented on Finding Your Roots revealed that she is of Filipino and German descent, with maternal ancestry traced to the Prussian region. Her great great grandfather was named Pedro Malhabor who hailed from Prussia, in present day Germany. She shares a surname with the Filipino hero, Datu Felipe Salonga, one of the first Filipinos in Latin America. She has a younger brother, Gerard (b. 1973), a musical conductor, composer, and arranger. At age six, she and her family relocated from Angeles City to Quezon City, later settling in San Juan.

At age seven, she made her professional stage debut in Repertory Philippines' production of The King and I (1978) and later played the title role in Annie in 1980 and 1984. She appeared in numerous other stage productions with the company, including The Sound of Music (1980) and The Fantasticks (1988). In the 1980s, Salonga frequently sang for the Marcos family during state dinners at the Malacañang Palace in Manila. Salonga's recording and screen careers developed simultaneously. In 1981, she released her debut album, Small Voice, which achieved Gold certification in the Philippines, and made her film debut in Tropang Bulilit. She earned a Filipino Academy of Movie Arts and Sciences (FAMAS) award nomination for Best Child Actress and won three consecutive Aliw Awards for Best Child Performer from 1980 to 1982.

Between 1983 and 1985, Salonga hosted the television program Love, Lea. She and her brother, Gerard, won second prize at the 1985 Metro Manila Popular Music Festival with Tess Concepcion's "Musika, Lata, Sipol at La La La" (Music, Tin Can, Whistle and La La La), and that same year, she opened for Menudo during their Manila concerts, later performing with them again and contributing to their album In Action (1987). As a teenager, Salonga appeared in films such as Like Father, Like Son (1985), Captain Barbell (1986), and Ninja Kids (1986) and appeared regularly on German Moreno's teen variety show That's Entertainment. She completed her primary and secondary education at Operation Brotherhood (OB) Montessori Center, then passed the National College Entrance Examination (NCEE) and continuing on a pre-medical track at Ateneo de Manila University. In 1988, Salonga released her second album, Lea, starred in the film Pik Pak Boom, and opened for Stevie Wonder in Manila. That same year, Salonga auditioned in Manila for the lead role of Kim in the musical Miss Saigon, singing "On My Own" from Les Misérables, a choice she later credited as the turning point of her international career, and "The Greatest Love of All." After final auditions and three days of intensive work sessions in London that December, she was offered the role.

=== 1989–1992: Miss Saigon and Aladdin ===
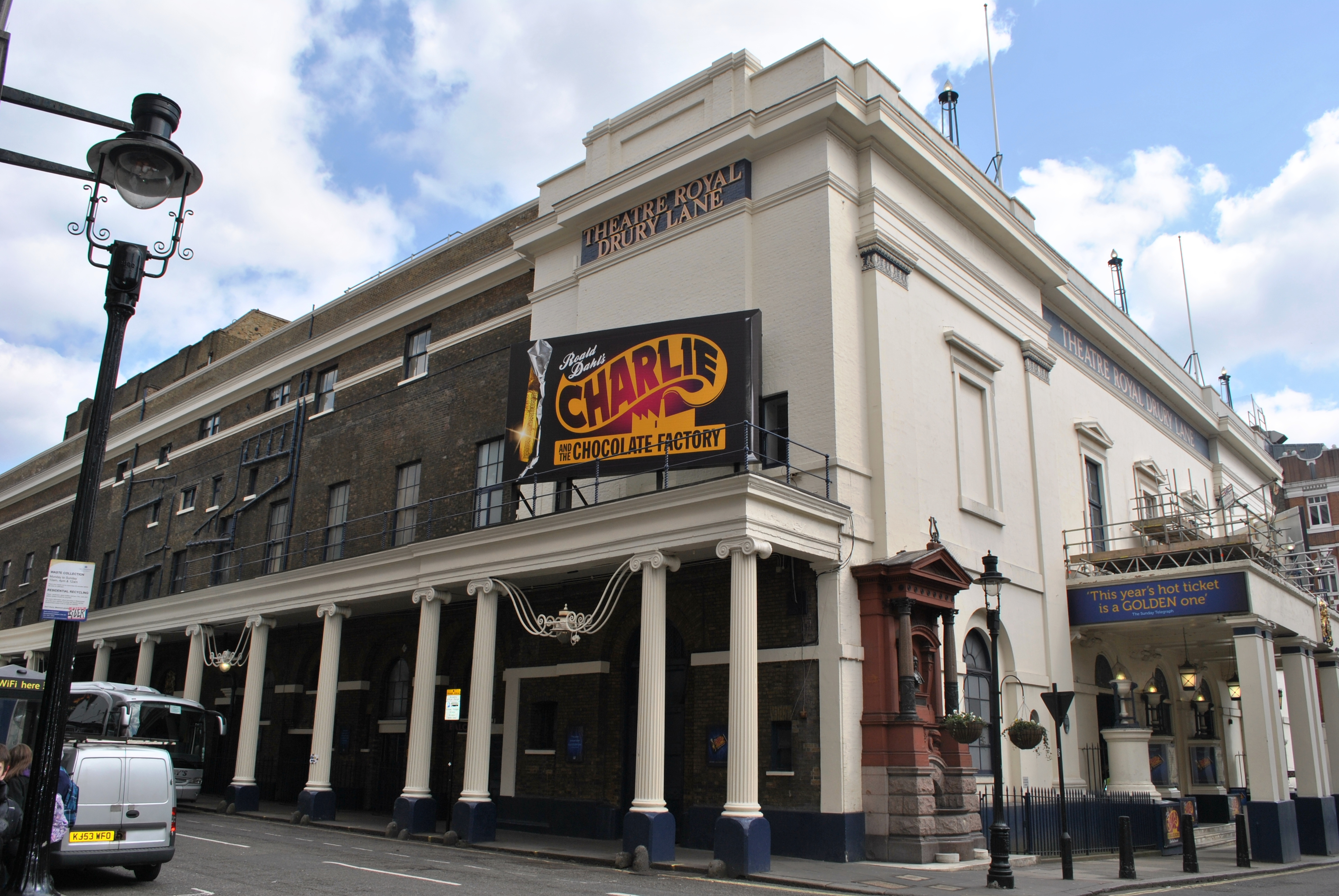
The Theatre Royal, Drury Lane, where Salonga gained international recognition in 1989

On September 20, 1989, Miss Saigon premiered at the Theatre Royal, Drury Lane to critical acclaim, following a gala performance the previous evening before Diana, Princess of Wales. For her performance, Salonga won the 1990 Laurence Olivier Award for Best Actress in a Musical. She also starred alongside Herbert Bautista in the anthology horror film Dear Diary (1989). In June 1990, she received the Presidential Merit Award from President Corazon Aquino for her contributions to the arts, and in December of the same year, she headlined A Miss Called Lea, a televised homecoming concert in Manila with the Philippine Philharmonic Orchestra and Ateneo de Manila College Glee Club. In 1991, Salonga struggled to find another role. In an interview with the BBC, she said that "my agent would be submitting me for auditions, [but people were still] like 'No, we won't see her because she's Asian. They were unable to imagine someone like me playing [those] roles."

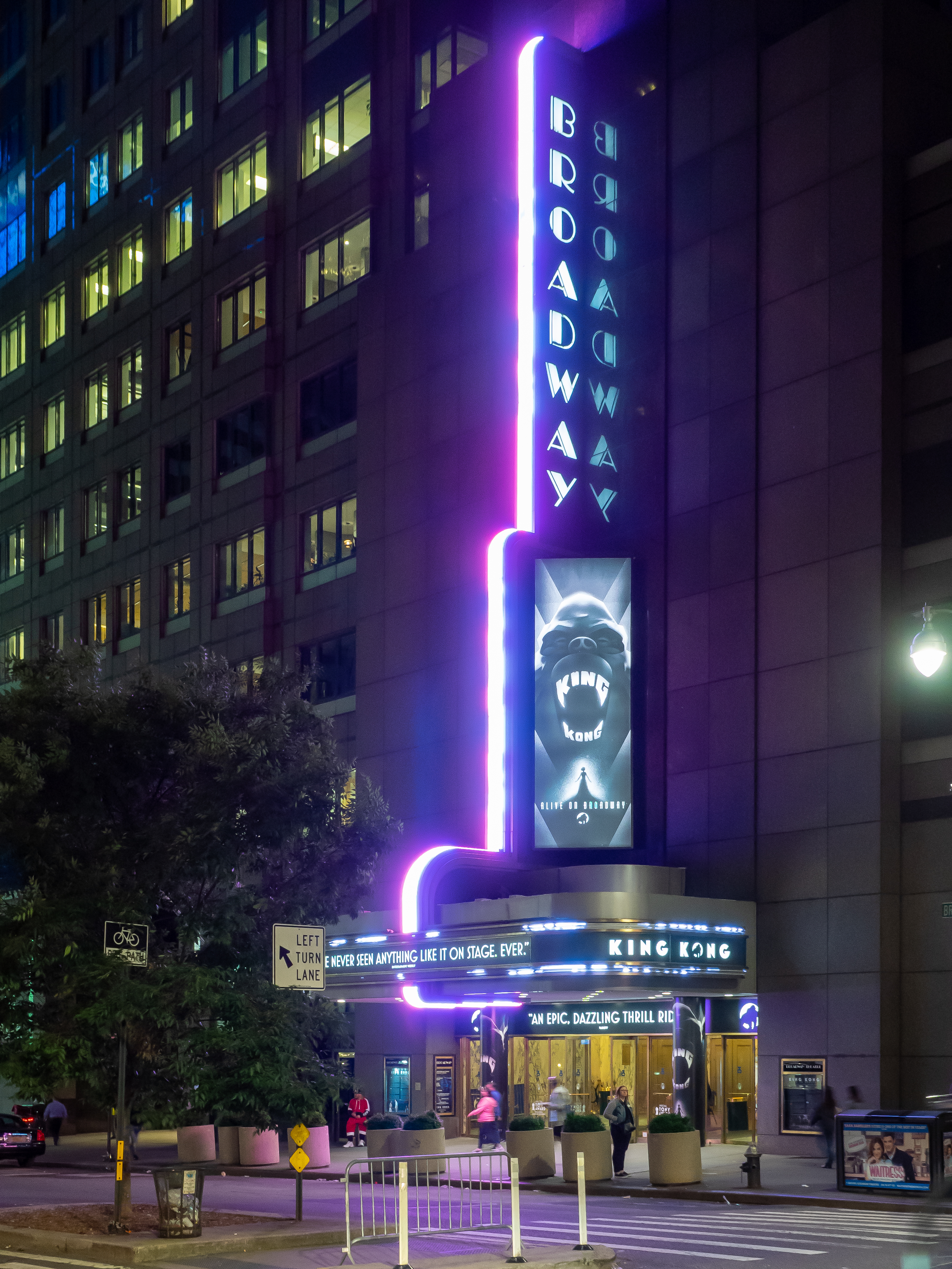
The Broadway Theatre, where Salonga made her Broadway debut in 1991

When Miss Saigon opened at the Broadway Theatre in 1991, Salonga reprised the role of Kim. For her performance, she won the Drama Desk, Outer Critics Circle, Theatre World, and Tony awards, becoming the first actress of Asian descent and the second-youngest performer to win the Tony Award for Best Actress in a Musical. Her casting prompted a brief dispute with the Actors' Equity Association, which sought to prioritize Asian-American performers, but the decision was overturned after producer Cameron Mackintosh argued no suitable replacement could be found. In the same year, People magazine named her one of its 50 Most Beautiful People. She also performed for President George H. W. Bush and First Lady Barbara Bush at the National Rehabilitation Hospital's Victory Awards at the Kennedy Center, as well as for Queen Elizabeth II and Prince Philip, Duke of Edinburgh, during the Royal Variety Performance at the Victoria Palace Theatre.

Beyond Miss Saigon, Salonga's work began attracting attention outside of theatre. In early 1992, while performing in Miss Saigon, Disney casting director Albert Tavares attended a performance and left a note, expressing interest in her for a project. Her agent soon arranged an audition, where she performed "Part of Your World" from The Little Mermaid (1989). Salonga was then invited to record a demo of "A Whole New World" and was ultimately cast as the singing voice of Princess Jasmine in Aladdin (1992), the first Disney princess of color. The song was released as a single and, as of March 2025, has been certified Platinum three times. Later in 1992, Salonga starred alongside Aga Muhlach and Ariel Rivera in the film Bakit Labis Kitang Mahal, for which she was nominated for Best Actress at the 1992 Metro Manila Film Festival, and appeared alongside Julie Andrews, Ben Kingsley, Peabo Bryson, and Marilyn Horne on the studio cast recording of The King and I. That same year, her agent submitted her for the role of Eliza Doolittle in the 1993 Broadway revival of My Fair Lady, but the casting director declined to audition her, citing her race. Shortly afterward, Mackintosh invited her to join the Broadway production of Les Misérables.

=== 1993–1996: Les Misérables, films, and other musicals ===
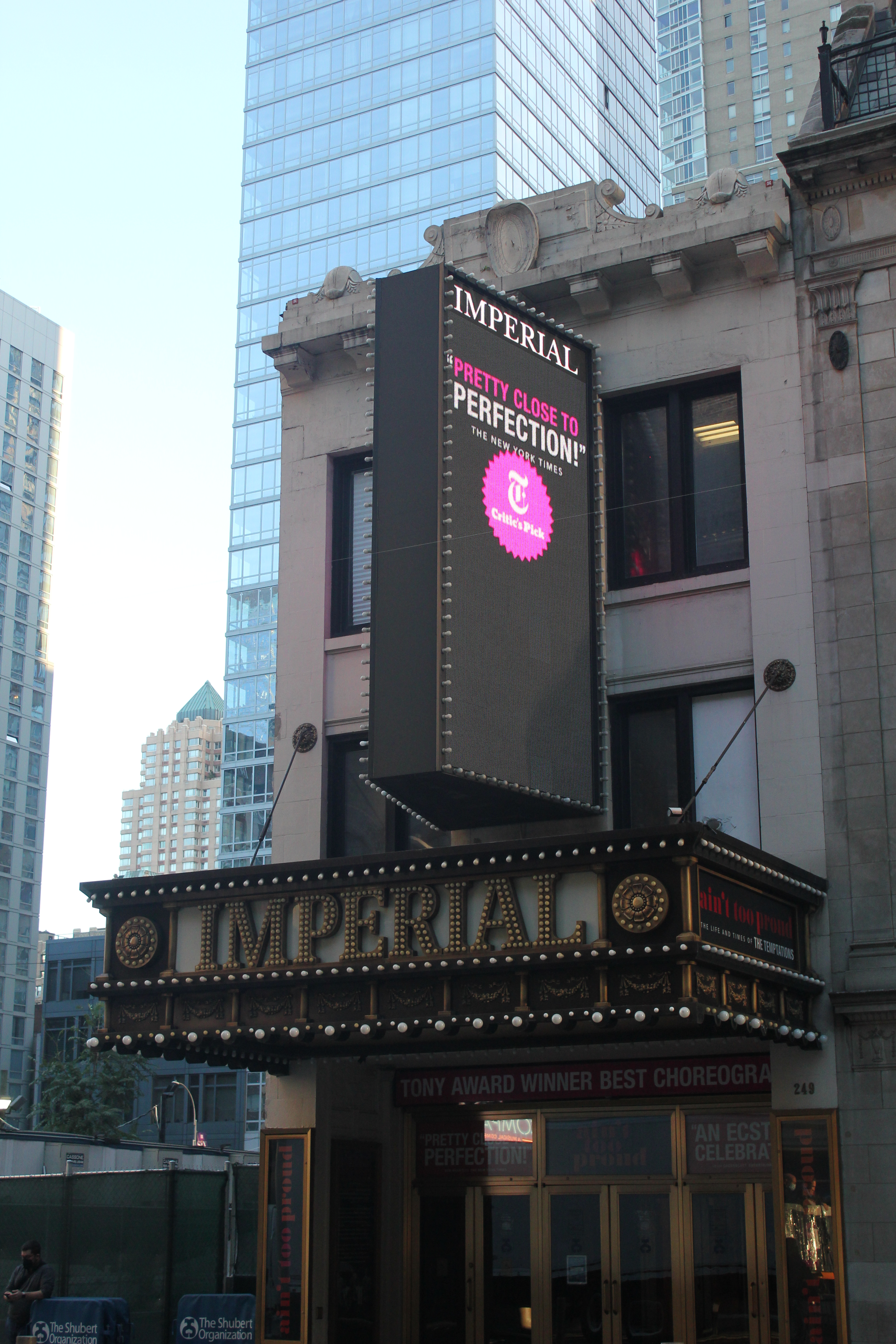
The Imperial Theatre, where Salonga became the first Asian to perform as Éponine on Broadway

In early 1993, Salonga played the role of Éponine in the Broadway production of Les Misérables at the Imperial Theatre. After leaving the production, she performed "A Whole New World" from Aladdin (1992) with Brad Kane at the 65th Academy Awards in Los Angeles, where the song won an Oscar, having already won a Golden Globe Award and Grammy Award. That same year, she released her self-titled international debut album with Atlantic Records, which achieved Platinum status in the Philippines. In 1994, Salonga played in various musical theatre productions in the Philippines and Singapore, including Sandy in Grease, Eliza Doolittle in My Fair Lady, and the Witch in Into the Woods. In March 1994, Salonga performed at the New England Presidential Dinner in Boston, where President Bill Clinton expressed his appreciation for her having traveled "thousands of miles to sing" before an audience that included First Lady Hillary Clinton and Senators Ted Kennedy and John Kerry. Three months later, she opened for Frank Sinatra during his concerts in Manila.

In 1995, Salonga starred alongside John Lithgow and Jeff Daniels in the role of Geri Riordan in the Hallmark Hall of Fame film Redwood Curtain. In the same year, she also starred again alongside Aga Muhlach in the film Sana Maulit Muli, earning a nomination for Pinakamahusay na Pangunahing Aktres (Best Lead Actress) at the 19th annual Gawad Urian Awards. She reprised the role of Éponine in the 10th-anniversary concert of Les Misérables at the Royal Albert Hall in London, which was recorded and later released as a film titled Les Misérables: The Dream Cast in Concert.

In 1996, Salonga was again in Les Misérables as Éponine in the West End production of the musical, playing at the Palace Theatre. In September of that same year, she continued to perform the role at the Neal S. Blaisdell Concert Hall in Honolulu, Hawaii, during the musical's U.S. national tour. In December 1996, Salonga represented the Philippines while performing at ONE: The WTO Show, the closing ceremony for the inaugural World Trade Organization (WTO) ministerial conference held at the Suntec Singapore Convention and Exhibition Centre.

=== 1997–2000: Recordings, Mulan, and Philippine stage work ===
In 1997, Salonga released I'd Like to Teach the World to Sing, which achieved Gold sales in the Philippines. That same year, she performed at the Hong Kong handover ceremony, appearing before Charles, Prince of Wales and President Jiang Zemin as part of the official celebrations. In 1998, Salonga provided the singing voice of the title character in Disney's Mulan and released the album In Love, which achieved multi-Platinum status in the Philippines. That year, she relocated to New York City, purchasing her own apartment, which she still owned as of 2013. She also appeared in Hey, Mr. Producer!, a London tribute concert to Cameron Mackintosh held at the Lyceum Theatre, performing for Queen Elizabeth II and Prince Philip, Duke of Edinburgh.

In 1999, Salonga made a return to Miss Saigon on Broadway. In February of that year, she was featured in an episode of the American Theatre Wing's Working in the Theatre alongside Iain Glen, Nicole Kidman, and Anna Manahan. That same year, Salonga starred as Sonia Walsk in the Singapore Repertory Theatre production of They're Playing Our Song at the Raffles Hotel and released the album By Heart (1999).

In 2000, Salonga reprised her role in They're Playing Our Song, this time staged in Camp Aguinaldo, Philippines, where she began a relationship with her co-star Michael K. Lee. In the same year, she briefly studied philosophy and history at Fordham University and performed in several major concerts, including The Millennium Concert, The Homecoming Concert, and Songs from the Screen, with the latter two recorded and released as albums. In October, she returned to Manila to appear in a Philippine production of Miss Saigon at the Cultural Center of the Philippines Complex.

=== 2001–2004: Broadway return, concerts, and marriage ===
In 2001, Salonga returned to the Broadway Theatre production of Miss Saigon, reprising the role of Kim and closing the show on January 28. She then transitioned to television, appearing as Lien Hughes on As the World Turns, guesting in Russell Watson's The Voice concert, narrating the PBS special My America: A Poetry Atlas of the United States, and portraying a lymphoma patient in the Season 8 Christmas episode of ER. That November, she starred in the role of Wu Mei-Li in the Los Angeles premiere of the Rodgers and Hammerstein revival Flower Drum Song at the Mark Taper Forum. Her performance earned her the Ovation Award for Lead Actress in a Musical. During this production, fellow cast member Christine Yasunaga introduced Salonga to American businessman of Chinese and Japanese heritage, Robert Chien, and the two began a relationship.

In 2002, Salonga went on to appear in her first non-musical stage role as Catherine in Proof in Manila, headlined The Broadway Concert at the Philippine International Convention Center, and performed in a Richard Rodgers tribute at the 56th Tony Awards with Harry Connick Jr., Peter Gallagher, and Michele Lee. In July, Salonga and Chien became engaged. When Flower Drum Song transferred to Broadway at the Virginia Theatre in October, Salonga reprised her role opposite Jose Llana. The Broadway revival cast album was later nominated for a Grammy Award for Best Musical Show Album, and her performance was praised by New York critics, earning her a nomination for The Drama League's Distinguished Performance Award. She also returned to Working in the Theatre in September, appearing with John Cullum, Edie Falco, Stanley Tucci, Marissa Jaret Winokur, and Charlayne Woodard.

From 2003 to 2004, Salonga remained active in both the Philippines and the United States. She staged her first "all-Filipino" concert in Manila, Songs from Home, for which she won the Aliw Award for Entertainer of the Year, and gave additional performances at Mohegan Sun in Connecticut, a holiday concert in the Philippines titled Home for Christmas, and shows in New Jersey. On October 18, 2003, she performed at Malacañang Palace for President George W. Bush and First Lady Laura Bush during a state visit to the Philippines. On January 10, 2004, she married Chien in a televised ceremony at the Cathedral of Our Lady of the Angels in Los Angeles. Later that year, she starred as Lizzie in the Manila production of the musical Baby, receiving another Aliw Award nomination, and reprised her Disney role as the singing voice of Fa Mulan in Mulan II.

=== 2005–2007: International ventures and motherhood ===
In 2005, Salonga embarked on her first U.S. concert tour. On November 7, she performed to a sold-out audience at Carnegie Hall in New York City for the benefit of the Diverse City Theater Company. That year, she also received the Golden Artist Award at the 53rd FAMAS Awards for her international achievements, sang at the grand opening of Hong Kong Disneyland, voiced Yasuko Kusakabe in Disney's English-language dub of Hayao Miyazaki's My Neighbor Totoro, appeared on the Daniel Rodríguez album In The Presence (2005), and contributed the foreword to Linda Marquart's The Right Way to Sing.

In 2006, Salonga gave birth to Nic Chien at Asian Hospital and Medical Center in Muntinlupa, Philippines. Later that year, she performed "Triumph of the One" before 50,000 attendees at the closing ceremony of the 15th Asian Games in Doha, Qatar, held at Khalifa International Stadium. Broadcast throughout Asia, the performance served as a highlight of the event's cultural program, celebrating regional unity and athletic excellence while reinforcing Salonga's reputation as one of the Philippines' foremost international performers.

In 2007, Salonga released Inspired, her first studio album in seven years, which was certified Platinum in the Philippines. That same year, she returned to Broadway as Fantine in Les Misérables at the Broadhurst Theatre, where her performances boosted ticket sales and secured her a place on Broadway.com's Audience Award shortlist for Best Replacement. President Gloria Macapagal Arroyo attended one of her performances, which also featured Filipino-American actors Adam Jacobs as Marius and Ali Ewoldt as Cosette. During her Broadway run, Salonga performed at Broadway on Broadway and Stars in the Alley, spoke at the Broadway Artists Alliance summer intensives, guested in The 25th Annual Putnam County Spelling Bee, and participated in Broadway Cares/Equity Fights AIDS' Nothing Like a Dame benefit. On August 14, President Arroyo appointed Salonga as Komandante (Commander) of the Orden ni Lakandula (Order of Lakandula), in recognition of using her talents to benefit Philippine society and foster cultural exchange. That same day, she received the Congressional Medal of Achievement from the House of Representatives of the Philippines for showing "the extent and depth of the Filipino musical talent" and "opening the way for other Filipino artists to break into the finest theaters in the world." In October, she headlined a concert with the U.S. Military Academy Band in West Point.

=== 2008–2012: Philippine Daily Inquirer columnist and touring ===
In 2008, Salonga began writing a column for the Philippine Daily Inquirer's entertainment section under the title Backstory, debuting with the piece "Introducing: Lea Salonga, writer." She performed select concerts around the world and was nominated for Best Performance by a Female Recording Artist at the 21st Awit Awards. She also toured Asia in the title role of Rodgers and Hammerstein's Cinderella, which opened in Manila in late 2008 and concluded in mid-2009.

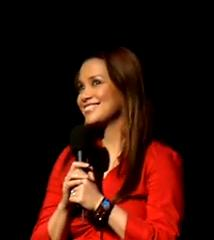
Salonga in New York in 2009

Throughout 2009, Salonga launched her Inspired concert tour in the U.S. and marked several milestones, including singing "Bayan Ko" (My Country) at the state funeral of former President Corazon Aquino and celebrating the twentieth anniversary of Miss Saigon with concerts at the Philippine International Convention Center, including Richard Poon and Ai-Ai delas Alas as guests. The same year, Salonga became a brand ambassador for Avon Products. In 2010, she returned to musical theatre as Grizabella in the Manila staging of the Asia-Pacific tour of Cats and later performed as Fantine in Les Misérables in Concert: The 25th Anniversary, fifteen years after appearing in the 10th Anniversary production as Éponine.

Salonga was named a Disney Legend in 2011 for her work as the singing voice of Princess Jasmine in Aladdin (1992) and Fa Mulan in Mulan (1998). She also served as a judge for the Miss Universe pageant in São Paulo, Brazil. In 2012, she originated the role of Kei Kimura in the world premiere of Allegiance at the Old Globe Theatre in San Diego, and starred in Philippine and Singapore productions of God of Carnage. She narrated Disney's Candlelight Processional at Epcot in Walt Disney World.

=== 2013–2018: The Voice of the Philippines and return to Broadway ===
In January 2013, Salonga appeared in Lincoln Center's American Songbook concert series at the Allen Room and, the following month, provided the theme song for TV5's reality singing competition Kanta Pilipinas. She also starred as Mother in a concert staging of Ragtime at Lincoln Center's Avery Fisher Hall alongside Tyne Daly, Patina Miller, and Norm Lewis. That June, she headlined 4 Stars: One World of Broadway Musicals in Tokyo and Osaka with Ramin Karimloo, Sierra Boggess, and Yu Shirota. Later that month, Salonga became one of four coaches on the inaugural season of ABS-CBN's The Voice of the Philippines, joining apl.de.ap, Sarah Geronimo, and Bamboo Mañalac. In December, she launched her Lea Salonga: Playlist concert tour in the Philippines to commemorate her thirty-fifth anniversary in entertainment, including Martin Nievera and Nic Chien as guests.

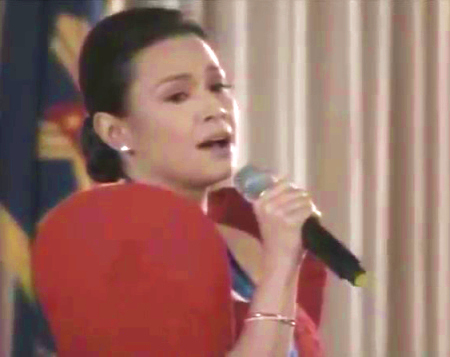
Salonga performing at the Malacañang Palace in 2014

Salonga returned as a coach for the second season of The Voice of the Philippines in 2014 and joined the new Philippine edition of The Voice Kids, serving for four seasons. That year, she recorded "Wished That I Could Call You" for the Children in Need benefit album, Love on 42nd Street, and toured Asia, Europe, and North America with Il Divo, including a concert at Nippon Budokan in Tokyo. In 2015, she toured in Australia and New Zealand and reprised the role of Kei Kimura in the Broadway production of Allegiance at the Longacre Theatre, earning critical acclaim for her vocal performance. In April 2016, she guest-starred on the season finale of Crazy Ex-Girlfriend, portraying Josh's visiting aunt, a former Star Search contestant, and performing the Disney-style parody song "One Indescribable Instant." In November 2016, Salonga starred as Helen Bechdel in the international premiere of Fun Home in Manila, receiving praise for her emotional range. That year, she also won two Aliw Awards, including Best Major Concert in a Foreign Venue and a second Entertainer of the Year honor.

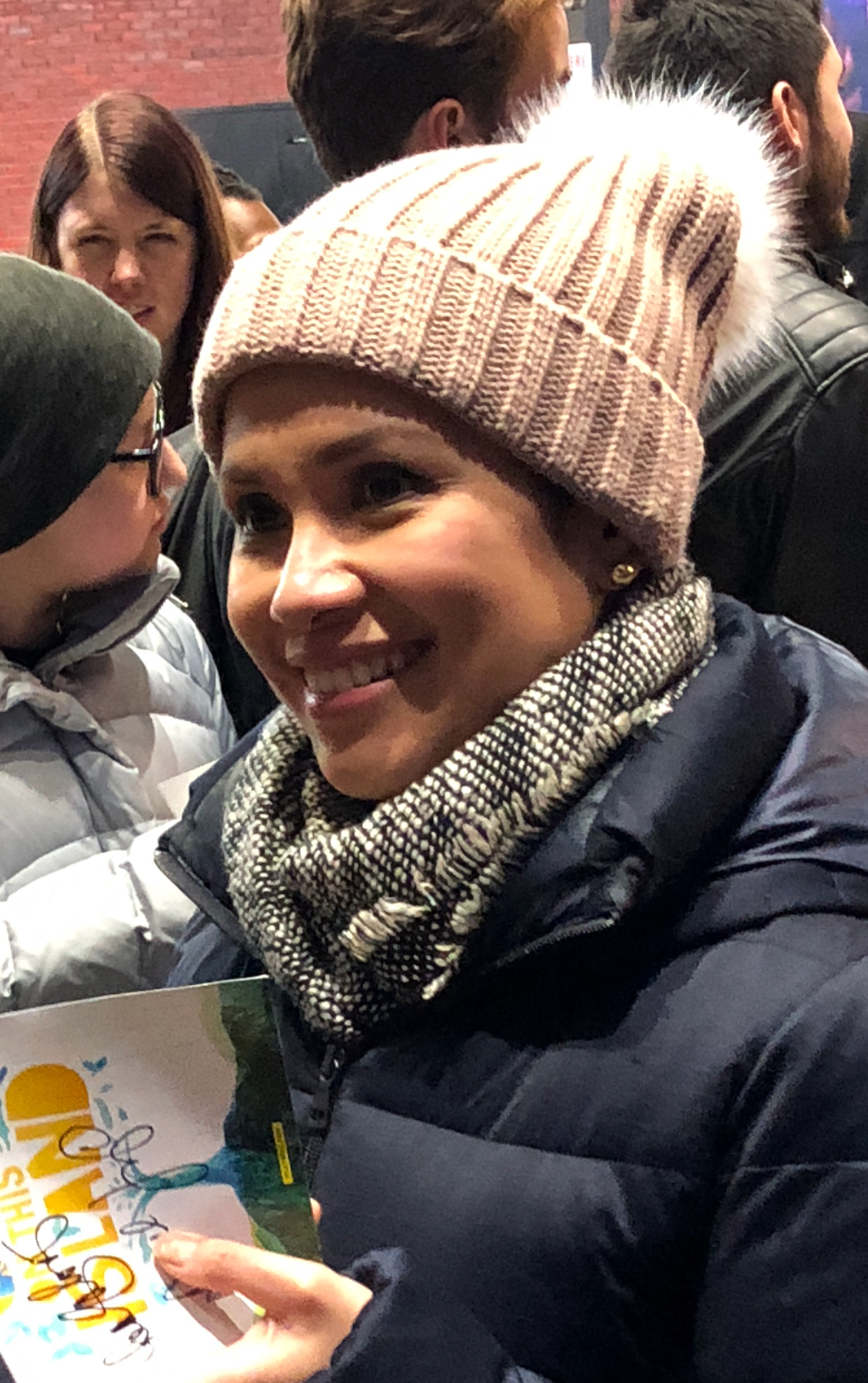
Salonga after a performance of Once on This Island

In 2017, Salonga joined The Voice Teens as a coach and released Bahaghari: Lea Salonga Sings Traditional Songs of the Philippines. She then portrayed Erzulie in the Broadway revival of Once on This Island at the Circle in the Square Theatre, earning critical acclaim for her vocals. In July 2018, Salonga played Grace Farrell in the Hollywood Bowl production of Annie. She later returned to Once on This Island in December for its final performances, and the cast album subsequently received a Grammy Award nomination for Best Musical Theater Album.

=== 2019–2022: Yellow Rose, Sweeney Todd, Dream Again Tour, and Pretty Little Liars ===
In 2019, Salonga appeared as Aunt Gail alongside Eva Noblezada, Dale Watson, and Princess Punzalan in the film Yellow Rose, which premiered at the Los Angeles Asian Pacific Film Festival. That May, she launched The Human Heart Tour, performing across North America before bringing the production to the United Kingdom, including a special appearance by Rachelle Ann Go in London. She also recorded the theme song "We Win As One" for the Southeast Asian Games, which served as the official anthem for the 2019 event. Later in the year, she starred as Mrs. Lovett in Sweeney Todd: The Demon Barber of Fleet Street in Manila and Singapore, a performance critics pointed to as a standout in her career. In the interim, Salonga performed concerts in Sydney, Melbourne, and Brisbane. PBS's Great Performances later aired her Sydney Opera House concert with the Sydney Symphony Orchestra, making the show accessible to home audiences.

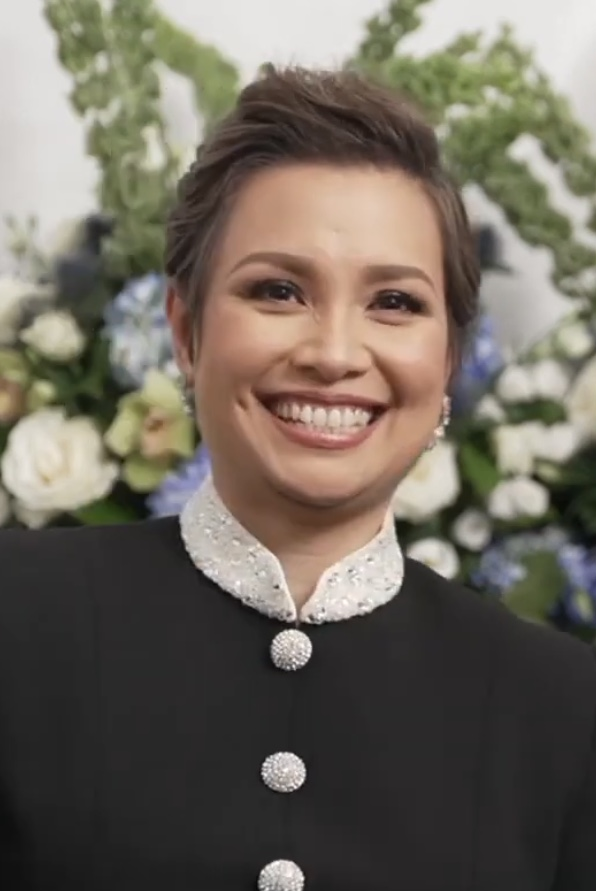
Salonga at the 74th Tony Awards in 2021

In early 2020, following a performance in Dubai, she postponed her planned North American tour in response to the global COVID-19 pandemic. During the pandemic, she participated in virtual fundraising events and released the song "Dream Again" in August, a hopeful anthem supporting pandemic relief efforts. In 2021, Salonga lent her voice to the character of the Mysterious Woman in Netflix's Centaurworld, and announced the Dream Again Tour with scheduled stops in the United Kingdom, later adding concerts across the United States and Canada. She concluded the year with a performance at Expo 2020 in Dubai, delivering a Christmas concert at the Dubai Exhibition Centre.

In 2022, Salonga launched the Dream Again Tour across the United States and Canada in April before extending it to the United Kingdom that summer. In May, she performed "The Prayer" at the National Memorial Day Concert in Washington, D.C., which was broadcast on PBS. That July, she joined the cast of Pretty Little Liars: Original Sin as Elodie Honrada and, in September, portrayed Mama Soubirous in the Manhattan workshop of The Song of Bernadette. Later that month, Salonga was honored at the Time100 Impact Awards as a "life-long role model for children of color," and in October she was featured on Pentatonix's album Holidays Around the World. She concluded the year as the headliner for the annual Christmas concerts with The Tabernacle Choir at the Conference Center of The Church of Jesus Christ of Latter-day Saints (LDS) in Salt Lake City, which were nationally televised and released the following year as the album Season of Light: Christmas with the Tabernacle Choir and Orchestra at Temple Square.

=== 2023–present: Here Lies Love, Old Friends, and Stage, Screen & Everything In Between Tour ===
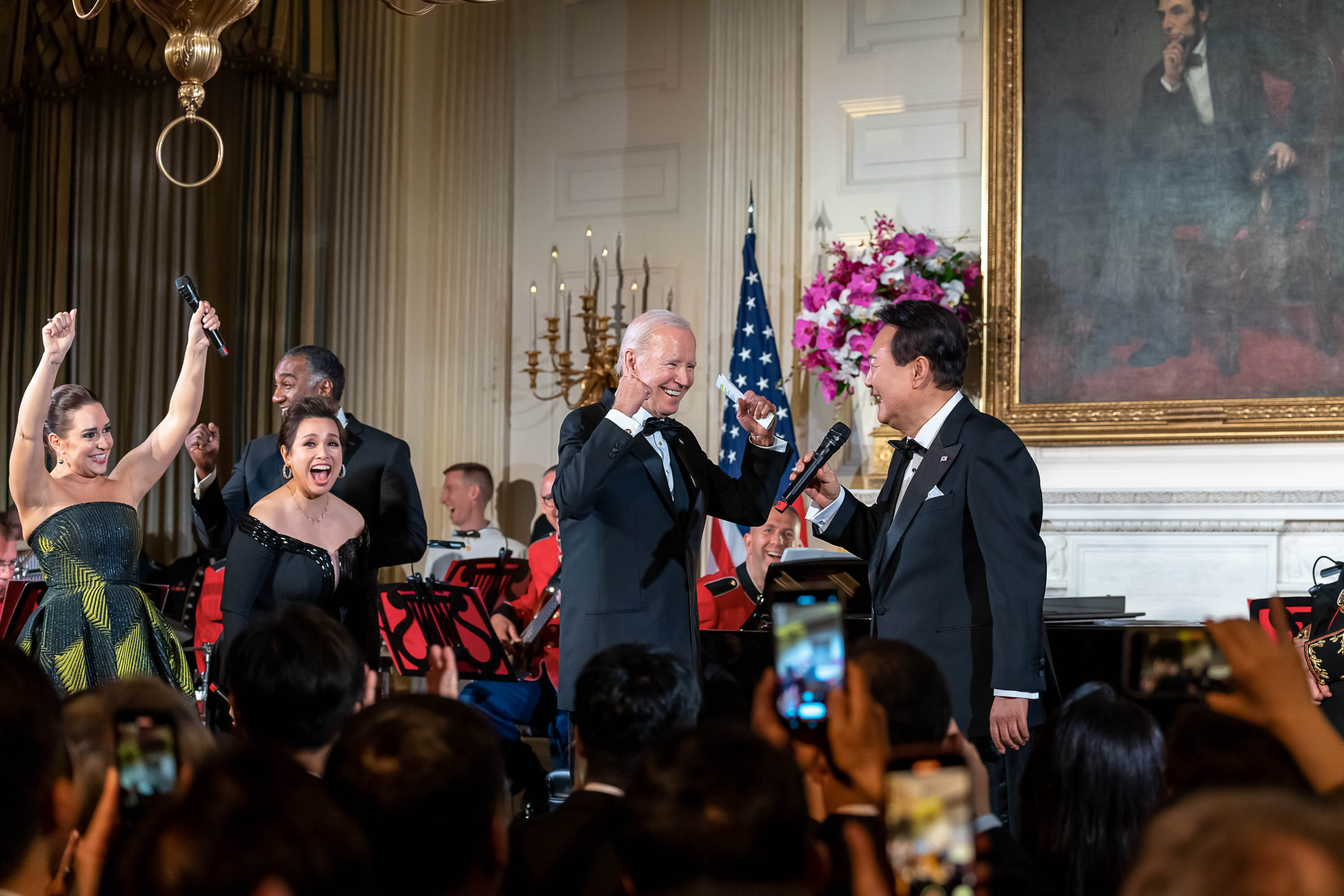
Salonga at a White House state dinner in 2023

In 2023, Salonga made her Broadway producing debut and appeared as Aurora Aquino, mother of Ninoy Aquino, in Here Lies Love at the Broadway Theatre, marking her return to Broadway and her first portrayal of a Filipino role on the Broadway stage. She performed concerts across the United States, appeared at Broadway Backwards at the New Amsterdam Theatre, and sang at the White House for U.S. President Joe Biden and South Korean President Yoon Suk Yeol. That spring, she received the Gold Legend Award at the Gold House Gala for her contributions to Asian Pacific representation, performed at The Asian American Foundation's Heritage Month Summit and Celebration, and appeared on the world premiere studio cast recording of the musical Wild About You. From September 2023 to January 2024, she starred alongside Bernadette Peters in Stephen Sondheim's Old Friends in the West End at the Gielgud Theatre.

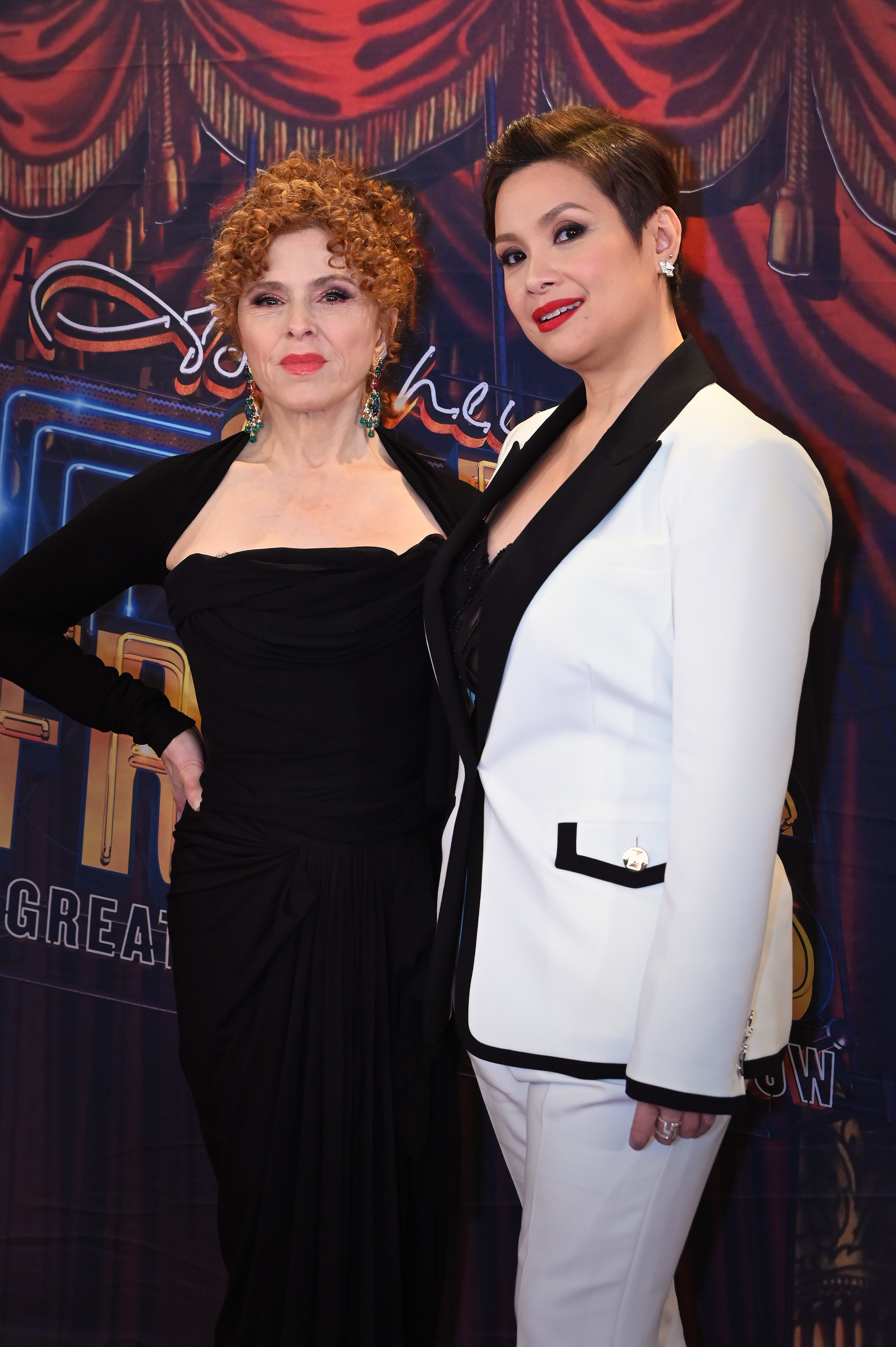
Salonga and Bernadette Peters at the opening night of Old Friends in 2025

In 2024, Salonga performed again with The Tabernacle Choir at the SM Mall of Asia Arena, reprised her role in Pretty Little Liars: Summer School, and launched the European leg of the Stage, Screen & Everything In Between concert tour, including a performance at the Theatre Royal, Drury Lane. That October, she starred in the Philippine adaptation of Franz Xaver Kroetz's Wunschkonzert, retitled Request sa Radyo, alternating performances with Dolly de Leon. In November, she released Sounding Joy, her first holiday album in more than two decades, launched the Asian leg of the Stage, Screen & Everything In Between concert tour, and performed on the Sesame Street float at the Macy's Thanksgiving Day Parade. In December, she embarked on the Sounding Joy: The Holiday Tour in the United States, which included a concert with the Boston Pops at Symphony Hall in Boston.

In 2025, Salonga reprised alongside Peters in Stephen Sondheim's Old Friends on Broadway at the Samuel J. Friedman Theatre, following a pre-Broadway run at the Ahmanson Theatre in Los Angeles. In the same year, she also appeared on Finding Your Roots, guest-starred on The Cleaning Lady, and provided the singing voice for Celine in KPop Demon Hunters. In May, she received the Distinguished Achievement in Musical Theatre Award at the 91st Annual Drama League Awards before returning to the Philippines to portray the Witch in Into the Woods in August alongside Arielle Jacobs and Nic Chien. In September, she launched the North American leg of the Stage, Screen & Everything In Between concert tour.

In 2026, Salonga revealed in an interview with TV5 that she had been separated from her husband, Robert Chien, "for a while".

She is set to star in the upcoming short film The Vale: Origins.

== Artistry ==
=== Musical style and themes ===
Regarding her musical repertoire, Salonga has articulated a preference for live, orchestral textures in the studio. Discussing her holiday album Sounding Joy (2024), she explained that "live strings, brasses and the rest of the live instruments" were added "to round out everything," noting the album's central themes of resilience and overcoming adversity. Within her pop output, industry classification places parts of her discography in ballad-leaning, melody-forward idioms; for example, AllMusic lists her studio album By Heart (1999) under the "easy listening" genre.

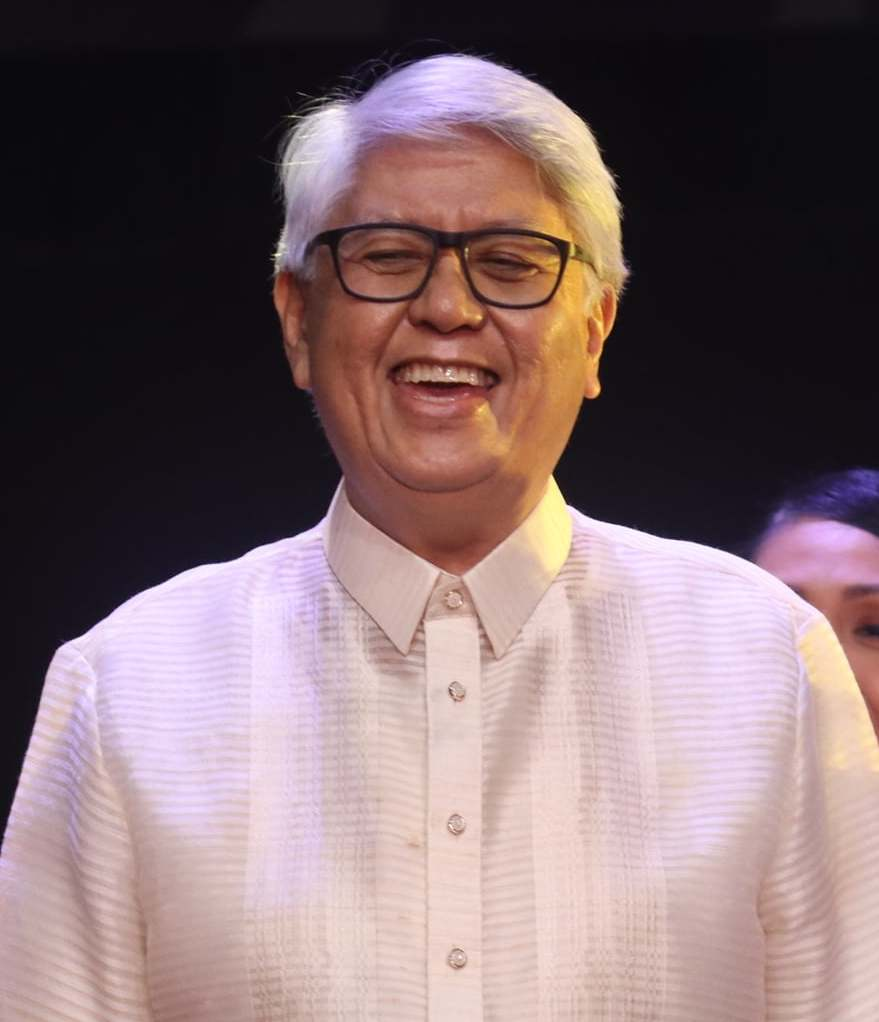
Ryan Cayabyab, who produced Bahaghari (2017)

Recurring lyrical motifs across her discography include love, longing, home, hope, and identity—hallmarks of the Filipino ballad tradition. Scholarly studies of kundiman and OPM highlight how these genres historically privilege romantic affect, melodic expressiveness, and emotional intimacy.

Salonga's studio work also functions as heritage curation. Bahaghari (2017) gathers 15 traditional songs across six Philippine languages—Tagalog, Kapampangan, Ilocano, Bicolano, Hiligaynon, and Cebuano (Bisaya)—and was produced by National Artist Ryan Cayabyab. Cayabyab has described the album's organizing principle as a wide expressive and topical spread—"varied in subject, in emotion and in tempo and rhythm . . . a good representation not only of language, but of a variety of subjects and emotions"—underscoring the project's studio aesthetic of restraint in service of text and tune.

=== Influences ===
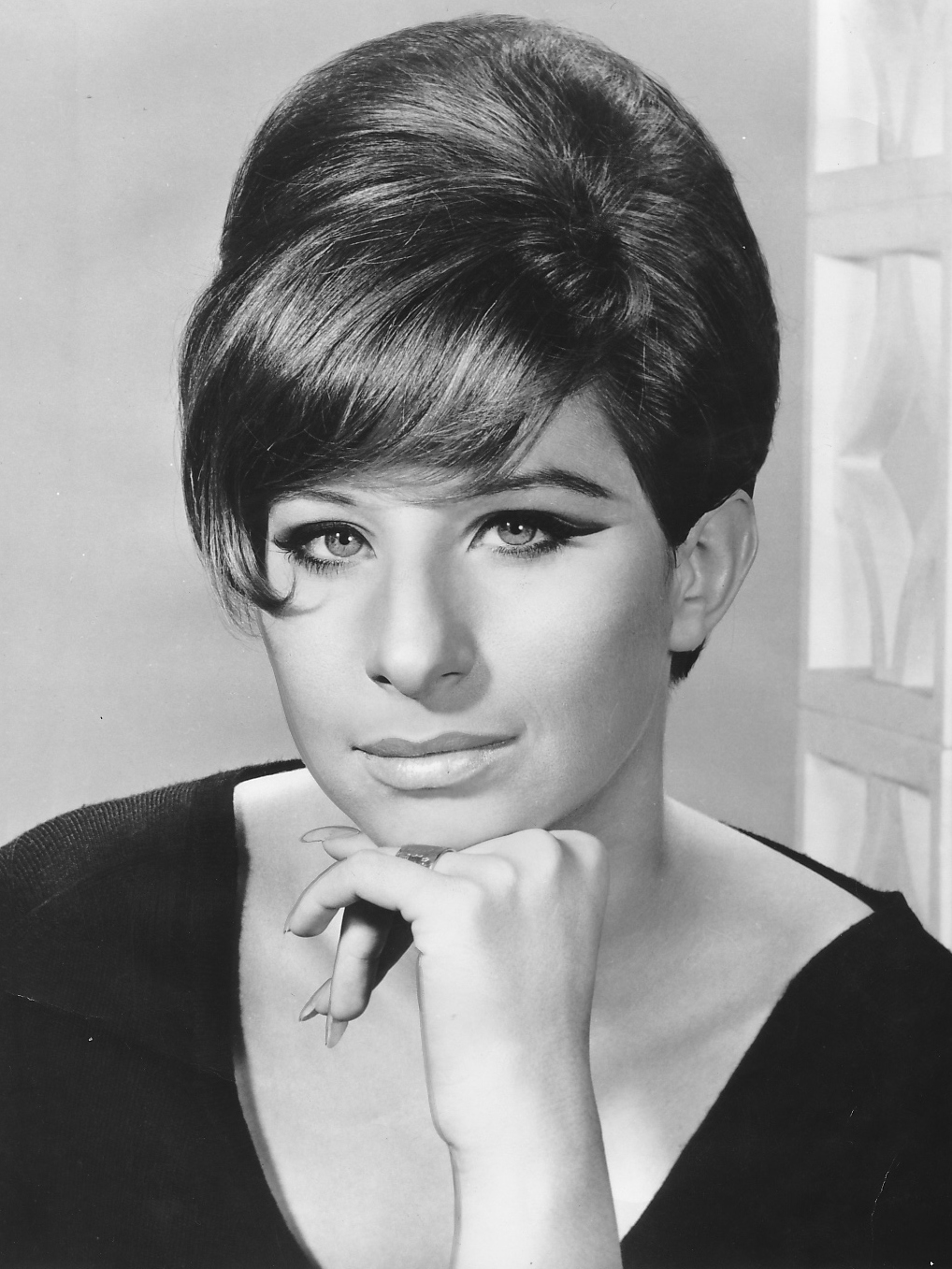
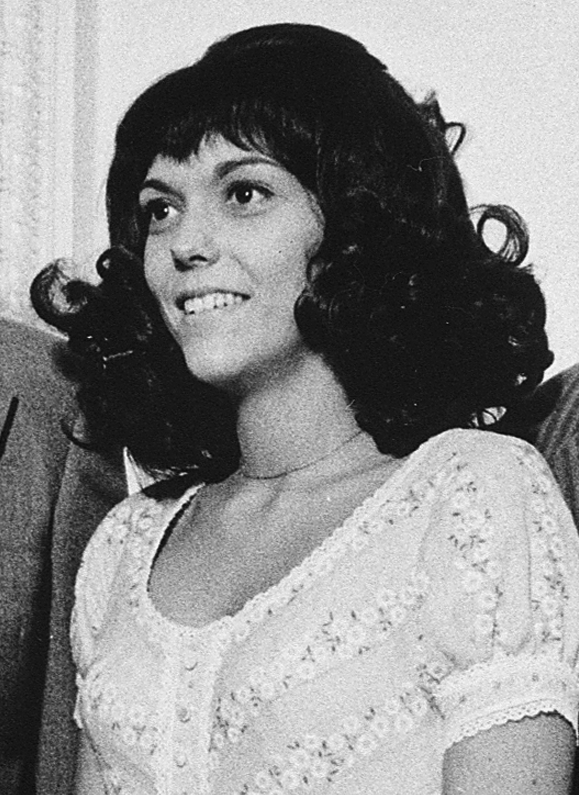
Salonga's major influences include Barbra Streisand (left) and Karen Carpenter (right).

Salonga has cited a wide range of musical artists as shaping her vocal style, but she has repeatedly emphasized Karen Carpenter and Barbra Streisand as among her most important influences. Speaking to the Los Angeles Times, she praised Carpenter's ability to "cut down to the essence of a lyric," emphasizing that "it's not just about vocal calisthenics, it's about being simple and clear." She has also described Streisand as "one of my favorites . . . not just because of her talent, which is mammoth, but everything she's done—producing, television, arranging," citing her as a model of versatility and artistic control. In other interviews, Salonga has expressed hopes of someday collaborating with Streisand, calling it a lifelong dream.

Alongside Carpenter and Streisand, Salonga has credited artists such as Olivia Newton-John, The Osmonds, ABBA, Ella Fitzgerald, Julie Andrews, and Elaine Paige with shaping her approach to singing. She admires Paige's "timbre" and "cutting quality," especially in Evita, and often cites these artists for their clarity, emotional honesty, and ability to tell stories through song. Salonga has contrasted this with modern singers whose technical virtuosity sometimes obscures lyrics, stressing that her influences taught her to prioritize communication and lyricism above all.

=== Voice ===
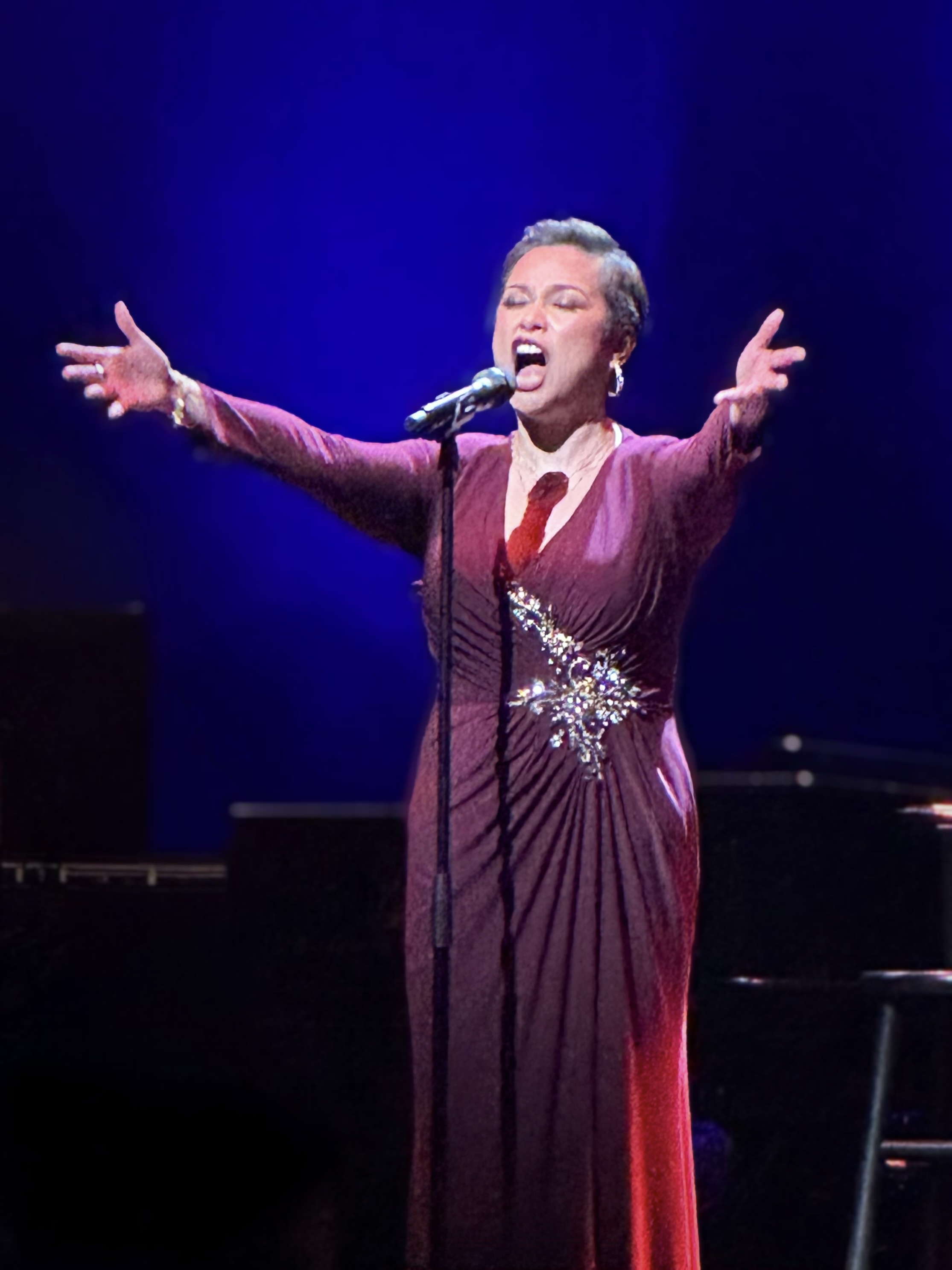
Salonga performing in Dallas in 2025

Salonga has been described as a soprano, with absolute pitch, also known as perfect pitch. Marilyn Stasio of Variety referred to her voice as "golden", while Rex Reed of Observer described it as "clear and as sparkling as Baccarat crystal".

== Achievements and legacy ==
=== Awards and nominations ===
Salonga is dubbed the "Pride of the Philippines." She is among the most awarded artists in the history of the Aliw Awards, with 18 nominations and 15 wins, including three consecutive Best Child Performer awards from 1980 to 1982, Entertainer of the Year in 2004, 2016, and 2018, the first People's Choice Award in 2018, and induction into the Hall of Fame in 2019. She also received FAMAS Award nominations for Best Child Actress in 1982 and Best Actress in 1996 before winning the Golden Artist Award in 2005.

Her international breakthrough came with her performance as Kim in Miss Saigon, for which she won the Laurence Olivier Award for Outstanding Performance of the Year by an Actress in a Musical in 1990 and, in 1991, became the first Asian actress to win a Tony Award and the second-youngest actress to win for Best Performance by a Leading Actress in a Musical. For the same performance, she also won the Drama Desk, Outer Critics Circle, and Theatre World awards. In addition, she has received two Grammy Award nominations for Best Musical Theater Album, for the Broadway cast recordings of Flower Drum Song (2004) and Once on This Island (2019). In 2025, Salonga was honored with the Distinguished Achievement in Musical Theatre Award at the 91st Annual Drama League Awards.

=== Cultural and state honors ===
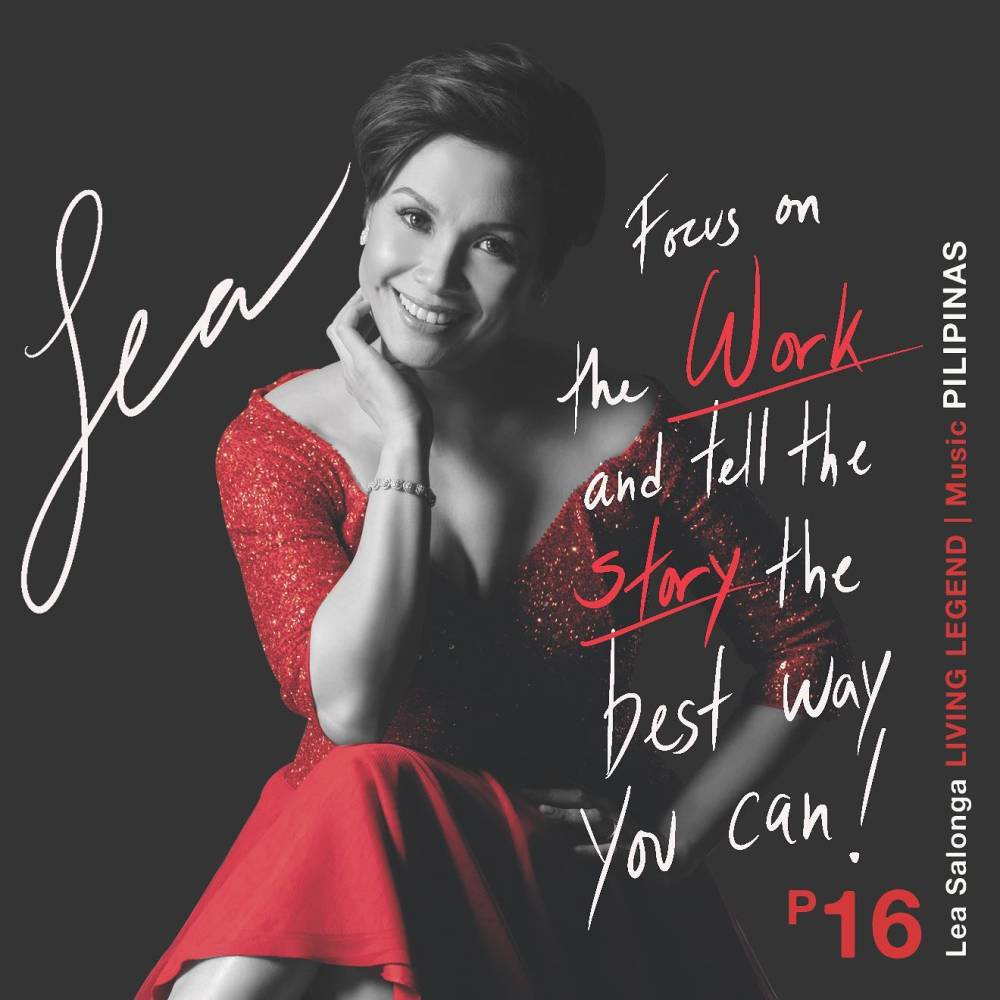
Salonga featured on a 2021 Philippine stamp

In recognition of her contributions to Philippine society and culture, Salonga has received multiple honors from Philippine presidents. In June 1990, she received the Presidential Merit Award from President Corazon Aquino for her contributions to the arts. On August 14, 2007, she received the Orden ni Lakandula (Order of Lakandula), with the rank of Komandante (Commander), from President Gloria Macapagal Arroyo, in recognition of using her talents to benefit Philippine society and foster cultural exchange. That same day, she received the Congressional Medal of Achievement from the House of Representatives of the Philippines for showing "the extent and depth of the Filipino musical talent" and "opening the way for other Filipino artists to break into the finest theaters in the world." In 2006, she was honored with a star on the Eastwood City Walk of Fame in Quezon City in recognition of her impact on Philippine entertainment. Internationally, she was named a Disney Legend in 2011 for her work as the singing voices of Princess Jasmine in Aladdin (1992) and Fa Mulan in Mulan (1998) and Mulan II (2004). She was included in the Time100 Impact Awards in 2022, honored with the Gold Legend Award from Gold House in 2023, and featured as a wax figure at Madame Tussauds Singapore in 2024. In September 2026, she became the first Filipino to be honored with a star on the Hollywood Walk of Fame in Los Angeles. The star, which is placed in front of the Hollywood Pantages Theatre, falls under the live performance category to honor her contributions to Broadway.

== Philanthropy and activism ==
=== Public health and reproductive rights ===
In 1987, the Johns Hopkins Bloomberg School of Public Health, the United States Agency for International Development, and the Population Center Foundation (later renamed the Philippine Center for Population and Development) established the Philippine Young People's Project and selected Salonga and Menudo to lead the campaign. Music videos, commercials, and live performances were used to sell the message of responsible sexual behavior and to encourage counseling for discussing and solving their problems. Additionally, Salonga promoted the campaign's program Dial-A-Friend, a telephone hotline that provides confidential counseling regarding mental health, relationships, and contraception.

You don't have to be pro-contraception to be pro-reproductive health . . . You choose for yourself, because I believe every individual has a choice.

— Salonga during a 2011 interview on State of the Nation

In 2011, Salonga expressed support for the Reproductive Health (RH) Bill, later signed and known as the Responsible Parenthood and Reproductive Health Act of 2012 or RH Law. On May 18, 2011, she was interviewed by Jessica Soho on State of the Nation about her views on the controversial bill. In the interview, Salonga showed understanding towards the anti-contraceptive stance held by many Filipino Catholics at the time but stated that the bill was designed "to serve every single Filipino."

=== LGBTQ rights ===
Salonga has long been a vocal advocate for LGBTQ equality and has consistently used her platform to promote inclusion and acceptance. On October 12, 2009, during a benefit concert at the Philippine Center's Kalayaan Hall in New York for Typhoon Ondoy victims, she explicitly aligned herself with marriage equality by declaring, "I believe that every single human being has the fundamental right to marry whoever they want." She was later recognized by The Advocate in 2011 as a "major gay icon," in part due to her early support and resonance with LGBTQ communities.

You presume correctly if you think I spend much of my time around gay people. Some of it is purely by circumstance, but a lot is by choice . . . It's time to think of gay people differently.

— Salonga (2013), "Backstory," Philippine Daily Inquirer

In February 2016, Salonga used her social media presence to denounce anti-LGBTQ statements made by Filipino politician Manny Pacquiao, responding sharply and drawing attention to the harm of such rhetoric. She further affirmed her solidarity with the transgender community in October 2018, tweeting, "Trans rights are human rights, and trans people will not be erased," conveying her ongoing commitment .

Salonga's advocacy extends beyond statements to active participation in LGBTQ-focused events and initiatives. In March 2025, she was announced as a special guest at Harmony, the annual gala of the New York City Gay Men's Chorus, where she presented the Gary Miller Award to George Takei for his contributions to LGBTQ activism.

Perhaps most personally, Salonga has embraced transgender advocacy within her own family. In an April 2025 People magazine feature, she publicly shared her experience raising her transmasculine son, Nic, emphasizing the importance of meeting each child "where they are" and providing unconditional love. She reflected that her theatre background informed her openness and capacity to support Nic through his journey: "I've learned how to raise a child who is their own being."

=== World hunger ===
Salonga was appointed a Goodwill Ambassador for the Food and Agriculture Organization of the United Nations (FAO) on October 15, 2010, alongside Raoul Bova, Celine Dion, and Susan Sarandon, in a ceremony tied to World Food Day in Rome. In her acceptance remarks at FAO headquarters, she framed the role in personal terms, emphasizing its importance to her "as an artist, as a woman, as a mother," and expressing gratitude for the chance to support "the hungry and impoverished."

I am very honored to assume today the office of Goodwill Ambassador of the Food and Agriculture Organization of the United Nations. It is of great significance to me, as an artist, as a woman, as a mother, to have the opportunity to participate in this global effort to give support to the hungry and impoverished.

— Salonga in her 2010 ambassador acceptance remarks

Salonga's appointment drew attention in both entertainment and political media. Philippine press outlets lauded her selection and emphasized its potential to spotlight food security issues, and Senator Kiko Pangilinan issued congratulations and noted the appointment could catalyze stronger policy dialogue on agriculture in the Philippines.

=== Anti‑Asian hate and gender-based violence ===
During the COVID-19 pandemic, Salonga emerged as a vocal critic of rising anti-Asian racism and gendered violence. On May 13, 2020, she joined Margaret Cho, Eugene Lee Yang, Judy Chu, and Grace Meng in "United Against Hate," a virtual town hall hosted by NBC Asian America, condemning xenophobic rhetoric and urging solidarity. On April 21, 2021, she appeared in "#AAPI Women Strong: Organizing Beyond a Hashtag," a forum backed by Public Wise, Onward Together, and the National Asian Pacific American Women's Forum. She joined voices such as Hillary Clinton, Lucy Liu, and Padma Lakshmi to address how anti-Asian violence intersects with gender and disproportionately affects women.

Silence is no longer an option. The Asian-Pacific Islander community has made significant contributions to the film industry as actors, producers, directors and writers, and now our people are being attacked.

— Salonga in 2021 on the rise of Anti-Asian violence

Salonga has also engaged in culture-based activism. In June 2021, she joined Filipino artists in the "#StopAllHate / #ShareLove" campaign, performing a version of "You've Got to Be Carefully Taught" as a response against anti-Asian discrimination. On social media and in public remarks, she has denounced hate crimes, urged legislation to classify attacks on Asians as hate crimes, and responded to the 2022 murder of Christina Yuna Lee.

== Screen and stage credits ==
=== Screen ===
==== Film ====
- Pik Pak Boom (1988)
- Aladdin (1992)
- Bakit Labis Kitang Mahal (1992)
- Sana Maulit Muli (1995)
- Mulan (1998)
- Les Misérables: The Dream Cast in Concert (1998)
- My Neighbor Totoro (2004)
- Mulan II (2004)
- Les Misérables in Concert: The 25th Anniversary (2010)
- Allegiance (2016)
- Yellow Rose (2019)
- KPop Demon Hunters (2025)
- Forgotten Island (2026)

==== Television ====
- That's Entertainment (1986)
- John en Marsha (1987)
- Sesame Street (1993)
- Redwood Curtain (1995)
- As the World Turns (2001, 2003)
- Sofia the First (2012, 2014)
- The Voice of the Philippines (2013, 2014–15)
- The Voice Kids (2014–2019)
- Crazy Ex-Girlfriend (2016)
- The Voice Teens (2017, 2020)
- Centaurworld (2021)
- Pretty Little Liars (2022, 2024)
- The Cleaning Lady (2025)

=== Stage ===
==== Broadway ====
- Miss Saigon (1991–1992, 1999, 2001)
- Les Misérables (1993, 2007)
- Flower Drum Song (2002–2003)
- Allegiance (2015–2016)
- Once on This Island (2017–2018, 2018–2019)
- Here Lies Love (2023)
- Stephen Sondheim's Old Friends (2025)

==== West End ====
- Miss Saigon (1989–1990)
- Les Misérables (1996)
- Stephen Sondheim's Old Friends (2023–2024)

==== Manila ====
- The King and I (1978)
- Annie (1980, 1984)
- My Fair Lady (1994)
- Grease (1995)
- Miss Saigon (2000)
- Cinderella (2008)
- Cats (2010)
- Fun Home (2016)
- Sweeney Todd: The Demon Barber of Fleet Street (2019)
- Request sa Radyo (2024)
- Into the Woods (2025)
- Les Misérables (2026)

== Discography ==
- Small Voice (1981)
- Lea (1988)
- Lea Salonga (1993)
- I'd Like to Teach The World to Sing (1997)
- By Heart (1999)
- Lea Salonga: The Christmas Album (2000)
- Sounding Joy (2024)

== Published works ==
=== Books ===
- Marquart, Linda (2005). The Right Way to Sing. Foreword by Lea Salonga. New York, New York: Allworth Press. ISBN 9781581154078.
- Michael, Ted (October 2, 2012). So You Wanna Be a Superstar?: The Ultimate Audition Guide. Foreword by Lea Salonga. Philadelphia, Pennsylvania: Running Press Kids. ISBN 9780762446100.

=== Columns ===
- Salonga, Lea (2008–present). "Backstory." Inquirer Entertainment. Makati, Metro Manila: Philippine Daily Inquirer; Inquirer Holdings, Incorporated. ISSN 0116-0443.

=== Audiobooks ===
- Ko, Lisa (2020). The Contractors. Narrated by Lea Salonga. Amazon Original Stories. ASIN B08FF2W658.

== See also ==
- Filipinos in the New York metropolitan area
- Honorific nicknames in popular music
- List of Asian Tony Award winners and nominees
- List of gay icons
- List of people with absolute pitch
- Recipients of Presidential Medal of Merit in the Philippines
