= Nic Chien =

Filipino actor and singer (born 2006)

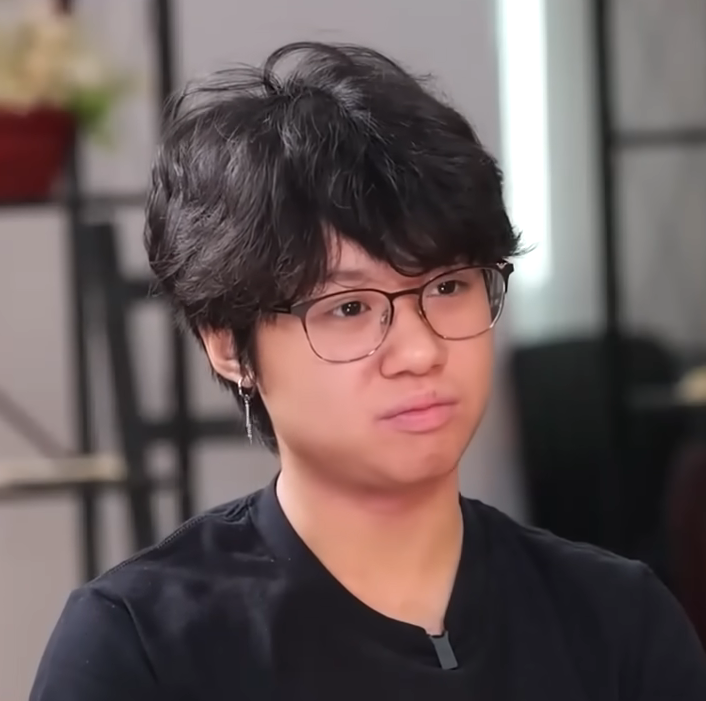
- Chien in 2026
- Born: May 16, 2006 (age 20); Muntinlupa, Philippines
- Occupations: Actor; singer; visual artist; theater
- Years active: 2017–present
- Mother: Lea Salonga
- Relatives: Gerard Salonga (uncle)

Nic Salonga Chien (born May 16, 2006) is a Filipino actor, singer, and visual artist. He (Note: Chien uses he/him and they/them pronouns. This article uses he/him for consistency.) has appeared in professional stage productions in the Philippines and internationally. He is the son of actress and singer Lea Salonga.

Chien first appeared in public performances as a child, singing duets with his mother in concerts and television appearances before making his professional stage debut as Alice in Matilda the Musical (2017) in Manila. He later gained recognition for his performance as Jack in a Philippine production of Into the Woods (2025). In addition to acting, Chien designed the cover artwork for Salonga's single Dream Again (2020). He is transmasculine and has spoken publicly about his gender transition and the role of supportive parenting in LGBTQ identity.

== Early life and education ==
Chien was born on May 16, 2006, at Asian Hospital and Medical Center in Muntinlupa, Philippines, to Lea Salonga, a Filipino actress and singer, and Robert Chien, an American businessman of Chinese and Japanese descent. He was assigned female at birth and went by his given name prior to transitioning in 2025. He was raised in both the Philippines and New York City, where his mother frequently worked. Chien developed an early interest in the performing arts, often accompanying his mother to rehearsals and productions.

Chien attended high school in New York. In April 2023, Chien won first place at the English-Speaking Union's New York City Branch Shakespeare Competition and third place at the 40th Annual National Shakespeare Competition. As of 2025, he has plans to take a gap year before beginning college, while continuing to pursue opportunities in music and acting.

== Career ==
=== 2013–2017: Childhood concert performances ===
Chien first performed publicly alongside his mother in December 2013, when they sang "Yesterday’s Dream" at the Playlist Concert at the Philippine International Convention Center. In February 2015, he joined her on The Voice of the Philippines, performing "Tomorrow" during the semi-finals. The two reunited in February 2017 for a rendition of "Pure Imagination" in the Songs from the Stage concert.

=== 2017–2024: Matilda, concert appearances, and visual arts ===
In November 2017, Chien made his professional stage debut as Alice in Atlantis Productions' Matilda the Musical at the Meralco Theater in Pasig. In October 2018, Chien and Lea Salonga performed "Shy" at The 40th Anniversary Concert. The following year, in August 2019, they appeared together in Perfect Ten: A Gala Performance. In December 2019, Chien performed alongside Salonga and Esang de Torres during Salonga's holiday concert, The Gift.

In 2020, Chien expanded into visual arts, designing the cover artwork for Salonga's single "Dream Again." The pair collaborated again in July 2021 for a virtual performance of "You Raise Me Up" during Gabay Guro's All-Star Concert for a Sustainable Philippines.

=== 2025–present: Into the Woods and Spring Awakening ===
In 2025, Chien was cast as Jack in a Philippine production of Into the Woods, opposite Lea Salonga as the Witch. The show ran at the Samsung Performing Arts Theater in Makati from August through September, with extended performances following strong audience demand. Critics highlighted his vocal performance and stage presence, identifying him as a promising emerging figure in Philippine and international musical theatre.

From February 13 to March 22, 2026, he will perform as Moritz in Spring Awakening at the Black Box at the Proscenium Theater in Makati.

== Personal life ==
In January 2025, Chien began testosterone therapy as part of his gender transition, later describing the experience as challenging but supported by his family. In interviews, he has emphasized the importance of affirming parenting, while his mother has spoken publicly about prioritizing empathy and safety for her son. Chien underwent top surgery in September 2025.

== Stage credits ==
Year(s)	Title	Role	Venue	Notes	Ref(s)
2017	Matilda the Musical	Alice	Meralco Theater, Pasig	Professional debut	
2025	Into the Woods	Jack	Samsung Performing Arts Theater, Makati		
2026	Spring Awakening	Moritz	The Black Box at the Proscenium Theater, Makati		

== See also ==
- List of transgender people
- Filipinos in the New York metropolitan area
