= Sounding Joy =

Studio album by Lea Salonga
- Released: November 1, 2024
- Recorded: Early 2020 – April 2024
- Genre: Christmas
- Length: 49:38
- Label: Center Stage
- Producer: Lea Salonga; Gerard Salonga; Josh Pultz; Daniel Edmonds

Lea Salonga chronology
Live in Concert with the Sydney Symphony Orchestra (2020)	Sounding Joy (2024)

Sounding Joy is a studio album by Filipino singer Lea Salonga, and her second Christmas album, after The Christmas Album. It was released digitally and on CD on November 1, 2024.

The album was initially scheduled to release in 2020. However, the COVID-19 pandemic resulted in the shutdown of the studio and delayed the release. It was officially announced on September 3, 2025, via social media.

In an interview, Salonga stated that the album embodies the message of "human resilience" and overcoming tragedy and obstacles, as "so much has happened [in all] of our lives since we started recording it." In another interview, Salonga discussed the title of the album, stating that "the word 'joy,' besides paying homage to my mom, whose nickname is Joy, is also about learning not to take things for granted and really learning how to find joy."

== Track listing ==
No.	Title	Writer(s)	Length
1.	"Christmas Time / The Most Wonderful Time of the Year"	Eddie Pola; George Wyle; Lee Mendelson; Vince Guaraldi	4:47
2.	"Sleigh Ride"	Leroy Anderson; Mitchell Parish	2:47
3.	"River"	Joni Mitchell	4:43
4.	"Christmas (Baby, Please Come Home)"	Ellie Greenwich; Jeff Barry; Phil Spector	3:07
5.	"Last Christmas"	George Michael	4:02
6.	"Christmas on Broadway"	Daniel Edmonds	3:40
7.	"All I Want for Christmas Is You"	Mariah Carey; Walter Afanasieff	4:25
8.	"Love Is Our Christmas Star"	Trina Belamide	4:35
9.	"What Child Is This / Silent Night"	Franz Xaver Gruber; William Chatterton Dix	5:15
10.	"I'll Be Home for Christmas"	Buck Ram; Kim Gannon; Walter Kent	4:00
11.	"This Christmas"	Donny Hathaway; Nadine Theresa McKinnor	4:01
12.	"Angels We Have Heard (Glory Be)" (with Clay Aiken)	Jonas Myrin; Jordan Smith	4:16
Total length:			49:38
