= Lea Salonga (album) =

1993 studio album by Lea Salonga

Studio album by Lea Salonga
- Released: October 1993 (Philippines & United States)
- Recorded: 1992–1993
- Genre: Pop, R&B
- Label: Musiko Records/Atlantic Records & BMG Records (Pilipinas) Inc.
- Producer: Glen Ballard

Lea Salonga chronology
Lea (1988)	Lea Salonga (1993)	I'd Like to Teach the World to Sing (1997)

Lea Salonga is the fourth studio album by the Filipino Broadway pop singer Lea Salonga. It was her first album to receive an international release in October 1993 through Atlantic Records, making her the first Filipino singer to be signed on an international record label. The album peaked at number 25 on the Billboard Heatseekers Albums, making Salonga the first Filipino to break onto the American chart. The making of this album was helmed by two multi-Grammy Award winners: Producer Glen Ballard, and Executive Producer Steve Greenberg.

== Track listing ==
No.	Title	Writer(s)	Length
1.	"Vision of You"	Rick Nowels, Ellen Shipley	4:41
2.	"Every Time We Fall"	Kit Hain, Mark Goldenberg	4:45
3.	"It's Just Good-Bye"	Cynthia Weil, Jay Gruska	3:51
4.	"Finish What You Started"	Marsha Malamet, Annie Roboff, April Lang	3:52
5.	"Heaven Tonight"	Carole Rowley, Tessa Niles, Charlie Mole	4:38
6.	"We Could Be in Love" (duet with Brad Kane)	Glen Burtnik, Shelly Peiken	4:20
7.	"Lessons of Love"	Siedah Garrett, Glen Ballard	4:03
8.	"Remind My Heart"	Hain, Jeff Franzel	4:59
9.	"I Honestly Love You"	Jeff Barry, Peter Allen	3:27
10.	"A Flame for You"	Dane Deviller, Sean Hosein, Connie Russell	3:21
11.	"The Journey"	Julie Gold	4:34

== Personnel ==
Credits adapted from the album liner notes.

=== Musicians ===
- Boy Angos – percussion
- Glen Ballard – keyboards
- Bruce Gaitson – acoustic guitar
- Mark Goldenberg – synthesizer
- Daniel Higgins – saxophone
- Joel F. Jacinto – percussion
- Jimmy Johnson – bass
- Randy Kerber – keyboards, synthesizer
- Brian Kilgore – percussion
- Michael Landau – guitar
- Greg Phillinganes – bass, synthesizer
- John Robinson – drums
- Lea Salonga – vocals
- Doug Scott – programming

=== Background vocals ===
- Maxi Anderson
- B.G. Ballard
- Amy Boylan
- Janak Chandrasoma
- Chalan Ford
- Phillip Ingram
- Edie Lehman
- Justin Jackson
- Megan Joyce
- Ben McCrary
- Arnold McCuller
- Clif Magness
- Rooney Saulsberry
- Christine Schilinger
- Mark Schilinger
- Kristen True
- Maxine Waters-Willard
- Julia Waters-Tilman

== Charts ==
Chart (1993)	Peak position
US Heatseekers Albums (Billboard)	25
