= The Human Heart Tour =

2019 concert tour by Lea Salonga

- Tour by Lea Salonga
- Location: North America; Europe
- Start date: April 5, 2019
- End date: July 21, 2019
- Legs: 2
- No. of shows: 25 in North America; 6 in Europe; 31 in total
- Guests: Rachelle Ann Go (in London)

The Human Heart Tour was a two-leg concert tour by Filipino singer Lea Salonga. The tour was titled after the Once on This Island song, "The Human Heart." The North American leg of the tour officially began on April 5, 2019 in Costa Mesa, California and ended on May 25, 2019 in Richmond, British Columbia. Salonga then transferred the tour to Europe, beginning performances on July 7, 2019 in Cardiff, Wales and ending on July 21, 2019 in London, England, with a duet including special guest Rachelle Ann Go.

The tour was originally intended to launch on February 8, 2019 in Hong Kong, followed by dates in Singapore; however, the Asian leg was cancelled due to a skiing accident in Japan which resulted in Salonga breaking her leg. The injury also resulted in the rescheduling of the European leg of the summer, which was originally intended to launch on February 26, 2019 in Manchester, England.

== Critical reception ==
Michael James Rocha with The San Diego Union-Tribune wrote that Salonga's performance was "flawless," noting her "precise" vocal diction and "crystalline" voice. Rachel Rogers with YorkMix wrote that her stage presence was "inviting and warm" and that she had her audience "entranced" with her "stunning" voice. Philip Lowe with The Nottingham Post wrote that the concert was an "glorious unforgettable evening," praising her "pitch perfect" voice.

== Shows ==
List of concerts, showing date, city, country, and venue
Date (2019)	City	Country	Venue
North America
April 5	Costa Mesa	United States	Segerstrom Center for the Arts
April 6	Cabazon	United States	Morongo Casino, Resort & Spa
April 7	San Diego	United States	Jacobs Music Center
April 9	Albuquerque	United States	Popejoy Hall
April 12	Brooks	United States	Cache Creek Casino Resort
April 13	Brooks	United States	Cache Creek Casino Resort
April 15	Federal Way	United States	Federal Way Performing Arts & Events Center
April 17	Calgary	Canada	Jack Singer Concert Hall
April 18	Winnipeg	Canada	Club Regent Event Centre
April 23	Sarasota	United States	Van Wezel Performing Arts Hall
April 26	Athens	United States	Hugh Hodgson Concert Hall
April 28	Toledo	United States	Toledo Museum of Art Peristyle
April 29	Mansfield	United States	The Renaissance Theatre
May 1	Columbus	United States	Cabaret at the Commons
May 3	Fort Wayne	United States	Embassy Theatre
May 4	Indianapolis	United States	The Cabaret
May 5	Indianapolis	United States	The Cabaret
May 10	Chicago	United States	Copernicus Center
May 12	Ridgefield	United States	Ridgefield Playhouse
May 13	New York City	United States	Sony Hall
May 15	New York City	United States	Sony Hall
May 17	Scottsdale	United States	Scottsdale Center for the Performing Arts
May 18	Lone Tree	United States	Lone Tree Arts Center
May 22	Northridge	United States	The Soraya
May 25	Richmond	Canada	River Rock Casino Resort
Europe
July 7	Cardiff	Wales	Wales Millennium Centre
July 10	Nottingham	England	Nottingham Royal Concert Hall
July 11	Birmingham	England	Symphony Hall
July 13	Manchester	England	Manchester Opera House
July 18	York	England	York Barbican
July 21	London	England	London Palladium
