= I'd Like to Teach the World to Sing (album) =

Studio album by Lea Salonga
- Released: 1997 (Philippines)
- Recorded: 1995–1996
- Genre: OPM/R&B
- Label: Musiko Records & BMG Records (Pilipinas) Inc.

Lea Salonga chronology
Lea Salonga (1993)	I'd Like to Teach the World to Sing (1997)	By Heart (1998)

Professional ratings
Review scores
Source	Rating
Allmusic	2/5 stars

I'd Like to Teach the World to Sing is the fifth album by singer and actress Lea Salonga. It was released three years after her multi-platinum selling album, Lea Salonga. It earned mixed reviews from critics. The album was a mixture of old and new recordings. One single was released from the album, the top ten hit, "Top of the World". The album went gold after six months of release.

== Track listing ==
1. Ngayon Pa Lang Tagumpay Ka Na (with Cris Villonco)
2. I'd Like to Teach the World to Sing (In Perfect Harmony)
3. Rainbow Connection
4. Sing
5. Chiquitita
6. Happiness (with Gerard Salonga)
7. Sa Ugoy Ng Duyan
8. Thank You for the Music
9. I Am But a Small Voice
10. Tomorrow
11. Someone's Waiting for You
12. Somewhere Over the Rainbow
13. Alphabet Song
14. When You Wish upon a Star
15. Mama
16. The Greatest Love of All
17. Top of the World
