= By Heart (Lea Salonga album) =

Studio album by Lea Salonga
- Released: 1999 (Philippines)
- Recorded: 1999
- Genre: OPM/R&B
- Labels: Musiko Records & BMG Records (Pilipinas) Inc.

Lea Salonga chronology
I'd Like to Teach The World to Sing (1997)	By Heart (1999)	Lea...In Love (1999)

By Heart is an album by Lea Salonga, released in 1999. It peaked at #1 in the Philippines on both the pop and R&B/soul albums chart. It produced two #1 crossover hits. The album earned positive reviews and was backed up by a successful tour.

== Track listing ==
1. "I Remember the Boy"
2. "Let the Pain Remain"
3. "I Will Always Stay This Way in Love with You"
4. "I Don't Love You Anymore"
5. "Till I Met You"
6. "How Can I?"
7. "Can We Just Stop and Talk Awhile?"
8. "Once Upon a Life"
9. "Afraid for Love to Fade"
10. "Say That You Love Me"
11. "A Long, Long Time Ago"
