= Stage, Screen & Everything In Between Tour =

2024–2025 concert tour by Lea Salonga

- Tour by Lea Salonga
- Location: Europe; Asia; North America
- Start date: June 21, 2024
- End date: December 12, 2025
- Legs: 3
- No. of shows: 8 in Europe; 4 in Asia; 32 in North America; 44 in total
- Guests: Clay Aiken (in Manila)

The Stage, Screen & Everything In Between Tour is a three-leg concert tour by Filipino singer Lea Salonga. The European leg of the tour officially began on June 21, 2024 in Wolverhampton, England and ended on July 1, 2024 in Manchester, England. Salonga then transferred the tour to Asia, scheduling two sold-out shows on November 4 and 5, 2024 in Manila, Philippines before adding a third show on November 7, 2024, performing alongside special guest Clay Aiken. She continued the Asian leg of the tour to Dubai, United Arab Emirates on November 10, 2024. In 2025, she continued the tour, launching the North American leg on September 11, 2025 in Athens, Georgia and will conclude on December 12, 2025 in West Palm Beach, Florida.

During the European leg, she was accompanied by Gerard Salonga (music director/piano), Martin Riley and Graeme Taylor (keyboards), Chris Allard (guitar), Hugh Richardson (bass guitar), Elliott Henshaw (drums), and backing vocalists Adam Filipe and Sarah Galbraith.

During the North American leg, she was accompanied by Larry Yurman (musical director/piano), Quinn Johnson and David Witham (keyboards), Paul Viapiano (guitar), Kevin Axt (bass), Warren Odze (drums), and background vocalists Sarah Galbraith and Andrew Kotzen.

== Set list ==
The following set list is representative of the June 30, 2024 concert at Festival Theatre in Edinburgh, Scotland. It does not represent all concerts for the tour.

=== Act I ===
1. "Lea Salonga Overture" (Band)
2. "Pure Imagination" (Willy Wonka & the Chocolate Factory)
3. "A Million Dreams" (The Greatest Showman)
4. "A Cockeyed Optimist" (South Pacific)
5. "She Used to Be Mine" (Waitress)
6. "Stayin' Alive" (Saturday Night Fever)
7. Movie Moments medley:
  - "(Everything I Do) I Do It for You" (Robin Hood: Prince of Thieves)
  - "Arthur's Theme (Best That You Can Do)" (Arthur)
  - "My Heart Will Go On" (Titanic)
  - "Don't You (Forget About Me)" (The Breakfast Club)
8. "The Movie in My Mind" (Miss Saigon)
9. "Last Night of the World" (Miss Saigon)
10. "Being Alive" (Company)

=== Act II ===
1. "Something's Coming" (West Side Story)
2. "By the Sea" (Sweeney Todd: The Demon Barber of Fleet Street)
3. Disney Princess sequence:
  - "Part of Your World" (The Little Mermaid)
  - "A Dream Is a Wish Your Heart Makes" (Cinderella)
  - "Colors of the Wind" (Pocahontas)
  - "Let It Go" (Frozen)
4. "Edelweiss" (The Sound of Music)
5. "Skyfall" (Skyfall)
6. Disney Legend roles:
  - "Reflection" (Mulan)
  - "A Whole New World" (Aladdin)
7. "On My Own" (Les Misérables)
8. "Rose's Turn" (Gypsy)

=== Encore ===
1. "Elephant Love Medley" (Moulin Rouge) – with Adam Filipe
2. "Over the Rainbow" (The Wizard of Oz)

== Critical reception ==
=== European leg ===
Several critics praised the concert’s structure for spanning Salonga’s stage and screen work while including unexpected selections. Theatre and Tonic described it as "literally like Ronseal, it does what it says on the tin," applauding her ease and grace across theatre hits, Disney classics, and film songs. Lisa in the Theatre highlighted the orchestral overture, Salonga's warmth, and her ability to surprise and move audiences with nostalgic film sections and emotive stage numbers at the Edinburgh date. Musical Theatre Review awarded the Cardiff performance five stars, noting "a palpable air of excitement" and the audience’s clear appreciation. Some criticism came from BroadwayWorld, which felt certain pop numbers—such as "(Don’t You) Forget About Me" and "My Heart Will Go On"—lacked the theatrical precision for which Salonga is known and cited overly intense stage lighting as distracting. Overall, critics agreed the set list showcased both her signature roles, including Miss Saigon and Les Misérables, and her versatility across genres, with audiences responding enthusiastically to the mix of familiar favorites and surprises.

=== Asian leg ===
Critics praised the Asian leg of the tour for Salonga's exceptional vocal performance, emotional storytelling, and thoughtfully curated setlist blending Broadway classics, Disney favorites, and contemporary pieces. Reviews from Manila highlighted the show's "magnificent" quality and her strong connection with hometown audiences, while Dubai critics commended her enduring stage presence and ability to captivate international crowds. The Manila concerts were also described as sold-out events showcasing Salonga’s musical legacy through songs from Miss Saigon, Les Misérables, her Disney repertoire, and classic film soundtracks, supported by a full orchestra and strong production values, with particularly memorable moments of nostalgia and audience connection. Minor observations about venue acoustics appeared in a few comments, but overall, the reception was overwhelmingly positive, emphasizing Salonga's continued artistry and global appeal.

=== North American leg ===
The Red & Black praised Salonga's sold-out Athens concert for its "electric mix of various musical hits across the stage and screen," noting highlights such as the Disney princess medley, "My Heart Will Go On," and her encore of "Somewhere Over the Rainbow." The review emphasized the evening's emotional impact, with audience members describing the performance as "nostalgic" and "inspiring," particularly for Asian American and Filipino communities who felt "seen" and represented. ABS-CBN noted that at her Houston show, Salonga drew Filipinos together in a spirited and heartfelt evening, performing for a crowd that celebrated her musical legacy. The concert was described as not just a showcase of her vocal talent, but also a gathering that underscored pride of heritage, emotional connection, and the power of music in bringing people together. BroadwayWorld described the Seattle stop of the tour as "electric, joyful, and impressively rowdy," noting her combination of vocal precision and emotional depth. The review highlighted her performances of Sondheim's "Everything's Coming Up Roses" and "Being Alive," her rapport with her band and backing vocalists, and her inclusion of unexpected selections such as "Don’t You (Forget About Me)" and "Stayin' Alive." It characterized the concert as "a delightful show and a privilege to witness," and reaffirmed Salonga's reputation as a confident and engaging performer.

== Shows ==
List of concerts, showing date, city, country, and venue
Date	City	Country	Venue
Europe
June 21, 2024	Wolverhampton	England	Grand Theatre
June 24, 2024	London	England	Theatre Royal, Drury Lane
June 25, 2024	Cardiff	Wales	Wales Millennium Centre
June 26, 2024	Bristol	England	Bristol Beacon
June 28, 2024	Nottingham	England	Royal Concert Hall
June 29, 2024	Gateshead	England	The Glasshouse
June 30, 2024	Edinburgh	Scotland	Festival Theatre
July 1, 2024	Manchester	England	Bridgewater Hall
Asia
November 4, 2024	Manila	Philippines	The Theater at Solaire
November 5, 2024	Manila	Philippines	The Theater at Solaire
November 7, 2024	Manila	Philippines	The Theater at Solaire
November 10, 2024	Dubai	United Arab Emirates	Coca-Cola Arena
North America
September 11, 2025	Athens	United States	University of Georgia Performing Arts Center
September 13, 2025	Houston	United States	Miller Outdoor Theatre
September 14, 2025	Dallas	United States	Winspear Opera House
September 16, 2025	Chicago	United States	Athenaeum Center for Thought and Culture
September 17, 2025	Chicago	United States	Athenaeum Center for Thought and Culture
September 19, 2025	Goshen	United States	Goshen College Music Center
September 26, 2025	Costa Mesa	United States	Segerstrom Center for the Arts
September 27, 2025	Temecula	United States	Pechanga Resort & Casino
October 3, 2025	Brooks	United States	Cache Creek Casino Resort
October 5, 2025	Modesto	United States	Gallo Center for the Arts
October 7, 2025	Beaverton	United States	Patricia Reser Center
October 8, 2025	Seattle	United States	Benaroya Hall
October 10, 2025	Richmond	Canada	River Rock Casino Resort
October 11, 2025	Richmond	Canada	River Rock Casino Resort
October 15, 2025	Calgary	Canada	Jack Singer Concert Hall
October 16, 2025	Winnipeg	Canada	Club Regent Event Centre
October 18, 2025	Toronto	Canada	The Theatre at Great Canadian Casino Resort Toronto
October 20, 2025	New York City	United States	The Town Hall
October 22, 2025	Ridgefield	United States	The Ridgefield Playhouse
October 24, 2025	Toronto	Canada	The Theatre at Great Canadian Casino Resort Toronto
November 5, 2025	Orem	United States	The Noorda Center for the Performing Arts
November 7, 2025	Las Vegas	United States	Encore Theater at Wynn Las Vegas
November 8, 2025	Las Vegas	United States	Encore Theater at Wynn Las Vegas
November 11, 2025	Tucson	United States	Fox Tucson Theatre
November 12, 2025	Mesa	United States	Virginia G. Piper Theater
November 14, 2025	Palm Desert	United States	McCallum Theatre
November 15, 2025	San Diego	United States	The Rady Shell at Jacobs Park
December 2, 2025	Troy	United States	Troy Savings Bank Music Hall
December 4, 2025	Amherst	United States	Tillis Performance Hall
December 6, 2025	Bethesda	United States	The Music Center at Strathmore
December 11, 2025	Miami	United States	Adrienne Arsht Center for the Performing Arts
December 12, 2025	West Palm Beach	United States	Kravis Center
