= Small Voice =

Studio album by Lea Salonga
- Released: 1981 (Philippines)
- Recorded: 1980–1981
- Genre: OPM, pop
- Label: FGS Records

Lea Salonga chronology
Small Voice (1981)	Lea (1988)

Small Voice is the debut album by Filipina singer and actress Lea Salonga released in 1981 by FGS Records. It was recorded when she was only nine years old.

Philippine critics gave the album and Salonga's performance positive reviews. The album was certified gold in the Philippines. After the success of the album, she was given her own TV variety show called Love, Lea.

== Track listing ==
1. "Alphabet Song" (Incipit: "A, you're adorable. B, you're so beautiful...")
2. "Can't Smile Without You"
3. "Give a Little Bit of Smile"
4. "Happiness" (duet with Gerard Salonga)
5. "I Am But a Small Voice" (originally composed by Roger Whittaker)
6. "Kinabukasan"
7. "Lupa Man Ay Langit Na Rin"
8. "Rainbow Connection"
9. "Sing"
10. "Someone's Waiting for You" (theme song from the animated feature film The Rescuers)
11. "Thank You for the Music"
12. "When You Wish Upon a Star"
