= The Christmas Album (Lea Salonga album) =

2000 studio album by Lea Salonga

Lea Salonga: The Christmas Album

Studio album by Lea Salonga
- Released: November 16, 2000 (Philippines)
- Recorded: 2000
- Genre: Christmas/OPM/R&B
- Label: Musiko Records & BMG Records (Pilipinas) Inc.

Lea Salonga chronology
Lea...In Love (1999)	Lea Salonga: The Christmas Album (2000)	Songs from The Screen (2001)

Lea Salonga: The Christmas Album is a Christmas-themed studio album by Filipino singer Lea Salonga.

The song "Sana Ngayong Pasko" (English: Hopefully This Christmas) was originally performed by Ariel Rivera.

== Track listing ==
1. Mary Did You Know
2. Grown-Up Christmas List
3. Pasko Na Sinta Ko
4. The Gift (duet with Michael Lee)
5. It's Just Another New Year's Eve
6. Sana Ngayong Pasko
7. Even Santa Fell In Love
8. Merry Christmas, Darling (with The Company)
9. The Christmas Song
10. Twelve Days of Christmas

== Charts ==
=== Albums ===
Chart	Position
Philippine Pop Albums Chart	5
Philippine R&B/Soul Albums Chart	4

=== Singles ===
Song	Chart	Position
My Grown-up Christmas List	Philippine Top 40	13
My Grown-up Christmas List	Philippine R&B/Soul Top 20	9
