= Lea (album) =

Studio album by Lea Salonga
- Released: July 1988 (Philippines)
- Recorded: 1986–1987
- Genre: OPM, R&B
- Label: OctoArts International Philippines

Lea Salonga chronology
Small Voice (1981)	Lea (1988)	Bakit Labis Kitang Mahal (album) (1992)

Lea is the second album by Lea Salonga, presenting a danceable R&B sound. The album received favourable reviews for its diverse mix of American-style R&B and easy listening ballads, and became her first multi-platinum album.

== Track listing ==
1. "Anything for You"
2. "I Still Believe" (duet with Charlie Masso of Menudo)
3. "I Wanna Little Love"
4. "If I Give My Heart to You"
5. "Mula Noon, Hanggang Ngayon"
6. "Only You"
7. "Please Naman"
8. "That Situation" (duet with Menudo)
