= Asian Hospital and Medical Center =

Private hospital in Muntinlupa, Philippines

- Eastern facade in June 2021

Geography
- Location: 2205 Civic Drive, Filinvest City, Alabang, Muntinlupa, Metro Manila, Philippines
- Coordinates: 14°24′48″N 121°02′37″E

Organization
- Care system: Private, PhilHealth-accredited
- Type: Tertiary

Services
- Standards: Department of Health
- Beds: 312

History
- Opened: May 11, 2002; 23 years ago

Links
- Website: asianhospital.com

The Asian Hospital and Medical Center (often known as "Asian"), established on May 11, 2002, is the first private tertiary hospital built in the southern part of Metro Manila, with Jorge Garcia as its founding chairman. It currently stands on a land area within Filinvest City, Alabang in Muntinlupa, measuring 17,258 square meters (185,760 sq ft) that both includes the main hospital building, Tower 2, and the hospital's medical offices.

== Awards and certifications ==
The medical center has been licensed by the Philippine Department of Health and is affiliated with and accredited to the Philippine Health Insurance Corporation (PhilHealth).

It has also been accredited by The Joint Commission International in 2013, 2016, 2019 along with its most recent Gold Seal accreditation in 2022.

== See also ==
- List of hospitals in the Philippines
