= Bieber (disambiguation) =

Justin Bieber (born 1994) is a Canadian singer.

Bieber may also refer to:

== People ==
- Bieber (surname), includes a list of notable people with the surname

== Places ==
- Bieber, Biebergemünd, Germany
- Bieber, California, United States, a census-designated place
- Bieber Bench, an upland area in the Ross Dependency of Antarctica
- Offenbach-Bieber, Germany, a borough of Offenbach am Main

== Rivers ==
- Bieber (Haune), a river in Hesse, Germany
- Bieber (Kinzig), a river in Hesse, Germany
- Bieber (Lahn), a river in Hesse, Germany
- Bieber (Rodau), a river in Hesse, Germany

== Other uses ==
- Bieber Transportation Group, a defunct American bus company based in Kutztown, Pennsylvania

== See also ==
- Beber (disambiguation)
- Biber (disambiguation)
