= Bobak (disambiguation) =

Bobak is a given name and a surname.

Bobak may also refer to:

- Bobak (Slavic demon)
- Bobak marmot

== See also ==
- Babak (disambiguation)
