= Biber (surname) =

Biber (German for beaver) is a German surname. Notable people with the surname include:

- Carl Heinrich Biber (1681–1749), Austrian violinist and composer, son of Heinrich Ignaz Biber
- George Edward Biber (1801–1874), German writer
- Heinrich Ignaz Franz Biber (1644–1704), Bohemian-Austrian composer and violinist
- James Biber, American architect
- Kathryn Biber (born 1978), American lawyer
- Michael Biber (born 1974), American businessman
- Stanley Biber (1923–2006), American surgeon who pioneered sex reassignment surgery

== See also ==
- Biber (disambiguation)
- Bieber (surname)
- Beber (surname)
- Bibek
