= Biefer =

Biefer is a surname. Notable people with the surname include:

- Charles Biefer (1896–?), Swiss water polo player
- Susan Biefer (born 1953), Canadian politician

== See also ==
- Bieber (surname)
