= Bieber (surname) =

Bieber is a surname of German origin. Notable people with the surname include:

- Andy Bieber (1917–1985), Canadian football player
- Christopher Bieber (born 1989), German footballer
- Clemens Bieber (born 1956), German operatic tenor
- David Bieber (born 1966), American convicted murderer
- Emilie Bieber (1810–1884) German photographer
- Florian Bieber (born 1973), Austrian political scientist
- Frederick Bieber (born 1950), American medical geneticist
- Friedrich Bieber (1873–1924), Austrian anthropologist
- Hailey Bieber (born 1996), American model and television personality and wife of Justin Bieber
- Hanna Bieber-Böhm (1851–1910), German feminist and pioneer
- Irving Bieber (1909–1971), American psychoanalyst
- Jeremy Bieber (born 1975), Canadian film producer
- Jodi Bieber (born 1966), South African photographer
- Justin Bieber (born 1994), Canadian singer
- Kurt Bieber (1930–2015), American actor
- Margarete Bieber (1879–1978), German American art historian
- Marianus Bieber (born 1958), German Catholic theologian
- Martin Bieber (1900–1974), German World War II officer
- Matthias Bieber (born 1986), Swiss ice hockey player
- Nita Bieber (1926–2019), American actress
- Oswald Bieber (1874–1955), German architect
- Owen Bieber (1929–2020), American trade union president
- Shane Bieber (born 1995), American baseball player
- Sigmar Bieber (born 1968), German footballer

== See also ==
- Bieber (disambiguation)
- Beiber
