= Somokluy =

Somokluy (Persian: سمكلوي), also rendered as Somoklu or Sumilku, may refer to:

- Somokluy-e Olya
- Somokluy-e Sofla
