= Babak =

Babak or Babek may refer to:

== People ==
- Papak or Babak (c. 222), Persian prince and father (or stepfather) of Ardashir I, founder of the Sasanian Empire
- Babak (Sasanian general) (6th century)
- Babak Khorramdin (c. 795/798–838), Iranian rebel leader

== Places ==
- Babek (city), Babek Rayon, Nakhchivan Autonomous Republic, Azerbaijan
  - Babek Rayon, Nakhchivan Autonomous Republic, Azerbaijan
- Babak, Ardabil, a village in Ardabil Province, Iran
- Babak, Hormozgan, a village in Hormozgan Province, Iran
- Babak Fort or Babak Castle, northwestern Iran
- Shahr-e Babak County, Kerman Province, Iran
  - Shahr-e Babak, capital of the county
- Babak River, a river in Lombok, Indonesia

== Other uses ==
- Babak (given name)
- Babek (film), a 1979 Azerbaijani film
- Babek (ballet), a ballet by Agshin Alizadeh

== See also ==
- Bibek
- Bobak
