= Anjirlu =

Anjirlu (Persian: انجيرلو) may refer to:

- Anjirlu, Bileh Savar, Ardabil Province
- Anjirlu, Germi, Ardabil Province
- Anjirlu Rural District, in Ardabil Province
