= Owdlu, Ardabil =

Village in Ardabil province, Iran

Owdlu Persian: زرگر
- Village
- Location within Iran
- Coordinates: 39°18′04″N 48°09′36″E
- Country: Iran
- Province: Ardabil
- County: Bileh Savar
- District: Central
- Rural District: Gug Tappeh

Population (2016)
  - Total: 685
- Time zone: UTC+3:30 (IRST)

Owdlu (Persian: اودلو) (Note: Also romanized as Odolo, Owdlū, Ūddolū, and Ūdlū; also known as Addooloo and Udli) is a village in Gug Tappeh Rural District of the Central District in Bileh Savar County, Ardabil province, Iran.

== Demographics ==
=== Population ===
At the time of the 2006 National Census, the village's population was 830 in 156 households. The following census in 2011 counted 767 people in 201 households. The 2016 census measured the population of the village as 685 people in 206 households.
