= Moradlu, Bileh Savar =

Village in Ardabil province, Iran

Moradlu Persian: مرادلو
- Village
- Location within Iran
- Coordinates: 39°16′54″N 48°08′19″E
- Country: Iran
- Province: Ardabil
- County: Bileh Savar
- District: Central
- Rural District: Gug Tappeh

Population (2016)
  - Total: 509
- Time zone: UTC+3:30 (IRST)

Moradlu (Persian: مرادلو) (Note: Also romanized as Morādlū) is a village in Gug Tappeh Rural District of the Central District in Bileh Savar County, Ardabil province, Iran.

== Demographics ==
=== Population ===
At the time of the 2006 National Census, the village's population was 707 in 134 households. The following census in 2011 counted 647 people in 163 households. The 2016 census measured the population of the village as 509 people in 171 households.
