= Qeshlaq-e Qirlu =

Village in Ardabil province, Iran

Qeshlaq-e Qirlu Persian: قشلاق قيرلو
- Village
- Location within Iran
- Coordinates: 39°16′04″N 48°05′06″E
- Country: Iran
- Province: Ardabil
- County: Bileh Savar
- District: Central
- Rural District: Gug Tappeh

Population (2016)
  - Total: 13
- Time zone: UTC+3:30 (IRST)

Qeshlaq-e Qirlu (Persian: قشلاق قيرلو) (Note: Also romanized as Qeshlāq-e Qīrlū) is a village in Gug Tappeh Rural District of the Central District in Bileh Savar County, Ardabil province, Iran.

== Demographics ==
=== Population ===
At the time of the 2006 National Census, the village's population was 22 in eight households. The following census in 2011 counted 17 people in four households. The 2016 census measured the population of the village as 13 people in six households.
