= Gug Tappeh, Ardabil =

Village in Ardabil province, Iran

Gug Tappeh Persian: گوگ تپه
- Village
- Location within Iran
- Coordinates: 39°20′06″N 48°13′46″E
- Country: Iran
- Province: Ardabil
- County: Bileh Savar
- District: Central
- Rural District: Gug Tappeh

Population (2016)
  - Total: 1,335
- Time zone: UTC+3:30 (IRST)

Gug Tappeh (Persian: گوگ تپه) (Note: Also known as Gog Tape, Gog Tappeh, Gök Tappeh, Guytapeh, and Perilship) is a village in, and the capital of, Gug Tappeh Rural District in the Central District of Bileh Savar County, Ardabil province, Iran.

== Demographics ==
=== Population ===
At the time of the 2006 National Census, the village's population was 1,678 in 374 households. The following census in 2011 counted 1,656 people in 426 households. The 2016 census measured the population of the village as 1,335 people in 407 households.
