= Khakriz, Ardabil =

Village in Ardabil province, Iran

Khakriz Persian: خاكريز
- Village
- Location within Iran
- Coordinates: 39°11′37″N 48°01′56″E
- Country: Iran
- Province: Ardabil
- County: Bileh Savar
- District: Central
- Rural District: Anjirlu

Population (2016)
  - Total: 132
- Time zone: UTC+3:30 (IRST)

Khakriz (Persian: خاكريز) (Note: Also romanized as Khākrīz) is a village in Anjirlu Rural District of the Central District in Bileh Savar County, Ardabil province, Iran.

== Demographics ==
=== Population ===
At the time of the 2006 National Census, the village's population was 216 in 44 households. The following census in 2011 counted 177 people in 43 households. The 2016 census measured the population of the village as 132 people in 44 households.
