= Biber =

Biber may refer to:

- Biber (surname)
- Biber (geology), a timespan in the glacial history of the Alps
- Biber (submarine), a World War II German midget submarine
- Biber, a bridge-carrying version of the German Leopard 1 tank
- Biber (LaTeX), a BibTeX replacement for users of Biblatex
- Biber (Switzerland) (also spelled Biberli), a traditional Swiss gingerbread confection
- Urfa Biber, Turkish dried pepper
- Biber salçası, paste made from chili peppers and salt
- Biber (magazine), Austrian news magazine for immigrants

== Rivers ==
- Biber (Alp), a river in Switzerland, tributary to the Alp
- Biber (Danube), a river in Bavaria, Germany, tributary to the Danube
- Biber (Möhne), a river in North Rhine-Westphalia, Germany, tributary of the Möhne
- Biber (Rhine), a river in Germany and Switzerland, tributary to the Rhine
- Biber (Schleuse), a river in Thuringia, Germany, tributary to the Schleuse (Weser basin)

== See also ==
- Beber (disambiguation)
- Bieber (disambiguation)
- Related surnames
  - Bóbr
  - Buber
  - Bobrowski
