= Qeshlaq-e Badeyr =

Village in Ardabil province, Iran

Qeshlaq-e Badeyr Persian: قشلاق بدير
- Village
- Location within Iran
- Coordinates: 39°14′59″N 48°03′22″E
- Country: Iran
- Province: Ardabil
- County: Bileh Savar
- District: Central
- Rural District: Anjirlu

Population (2016)
  - Total: 0
- Time zone: UTC+3:30 (IRST)

Qeshlaq-e Badeyr (Persian: قشلاق بدير) (Note: Also romanized as Qeshlāq-e Badeyr) is a village in Anjirlu Rural District of the Central District in Bileh Savar County, Ardabil province, Iran.

== Demographics ==
=== Population ===
At the time of the 2006 National Census, the village's population was 17 in six households. The village did not appear in the following census of 2011 The 2016 census measured the population of the village as zero.
