= Qiz Qalehsi =

Village in Ardabil province, Iran

Qiz Qalehsi Persian: قيزقلعه سي
- Village
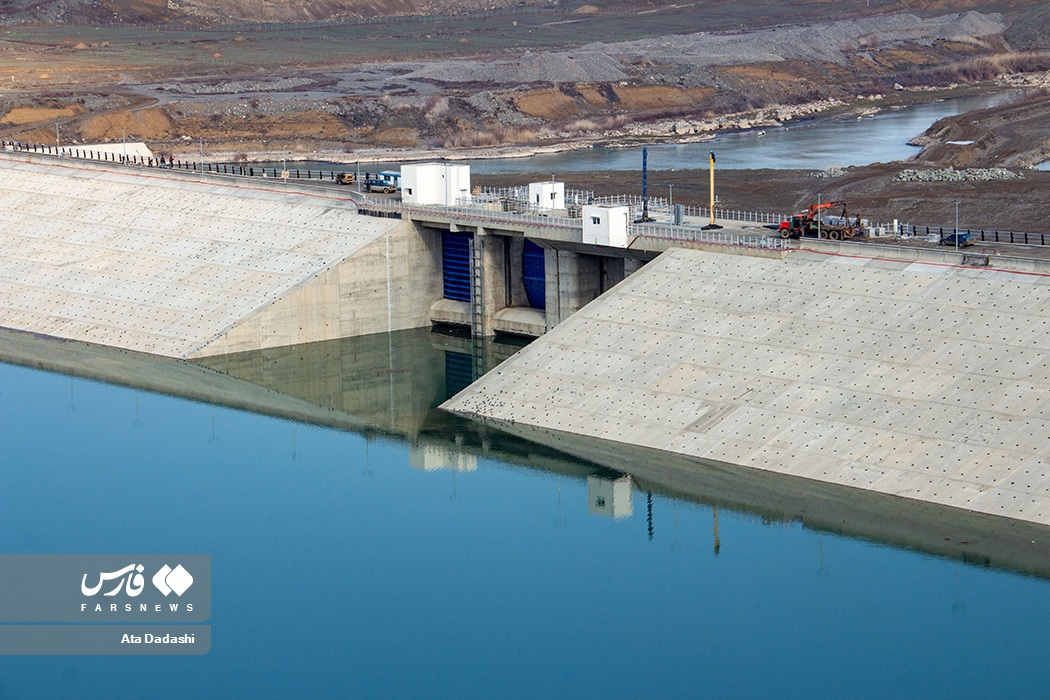

- Location within Iran
- Coordinates: 39°10′26″N 48°03′49″E
- Country: Iran
- Province: Ardabil
- County: Bileh Savar
- District: Central
- Rural District: Anjirlu

Population (2016)
  - Total: 761
- Time zone: UTC+3:30 (IRST)

Qiz Qalehsi (Persian: قيزقلعه سي) (Note: Also romanized as Qīz Qal‘ehsī; also known as Qez Qal‘ehsī) is a village in Anjirlu Rural District of the Central District in Bileh Savar County, Ardabil province, Iran.

== Demographics ==
=== Population ===
At the time of the 2006 National Census, the village's population was 811 in 136 households. The following census in 2011 counted 910 people in 205 households. The 2016 census measured the population of the village as 761 people in 217 households. It was the most populous village in its rural district.
