= Hajji Bala Beyglu =

Village in Ardabil province, Iran

Hajji Bala Beyglu Persian: حاجي بالابيگلو
- Village
- Location within Iran
- Country: Iran
- Province: Ardabil
- County: Bileh Savar
- District: Central
- Rural District: Anjirlu

Population (2016)
  - Total: 157
- Time zone: UTC+3:30 (IRST)

Hajji Bala Beyglu (Persian: حاجي بالابيگلو) (Note: Also romanized as Ḩājjī Bālā Beyglū; also known as Bal and Bel) is a village in Anjirlu Rural District of the Central District in Bileh Savar County, Ardabil province, Iran.

== Demographics ==
=== Population ===
At the time of the 2006 National Census, the village's population was 173 in 42 households. The following census in 2011 counted 183 people in 48 households. The 2016 census measured the population of the village as 157 people in 50 households.
