= Masjedlu, Bileh Savar =

Village in Ardabil province, Iran

Masjedlu Persian: مسجدلو
- Village
- Location within Iran
- Coordinates: 39°09′24″N 48°00′04″E
- Country: Iran
- Province: Ardabil
- County: Bileh Savar
- District: Central
- Rural District: Anjirlu

Population (2016)
  - Total: 138
- Time zone: UTC+3:30 (IRST)

Masjedlu (Persian: مسجدلو) (Note: Also romanized as Masjedlū) is a village in Anjirlu Rural District of the Central District in Bileh Savar County, Ardabil province, Iran.

== Demographics ==
=== Population ===
At the time of the 2006 National Census, the village's population was 278 in 51 households. The following census in 2011 counted 225 people in 48 households. The 2016 census measured the population of the village as 138 people in 48 households.
