= Beyg Baghlu =

Village in Ardabil province, Iran

Beyg Baghlu Persian: بيگ باغلو
- Village
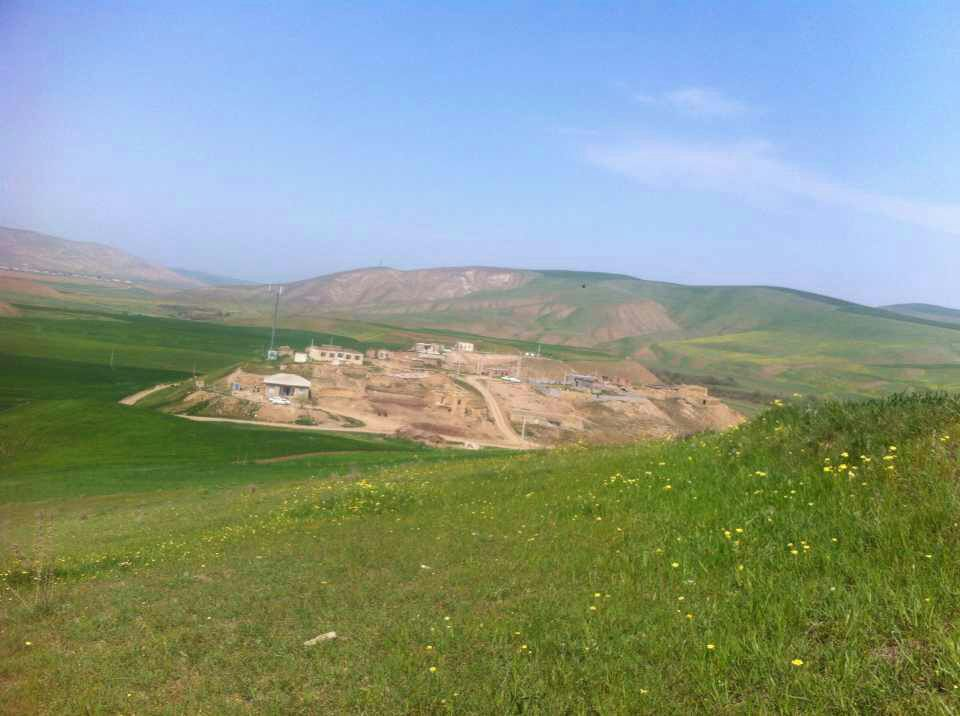
- The village of Beyg Baghlu

- Location within Iran
- Coordinates: 39°15′11″N 48°07′42″E
- Country: Iran
- Province: Ardabil
- County: Bileh Savar
- District: Central
- Rural District: Gug Tappeh

Population (2016)
  - Total: Below reporting threshold
- Time zone: UTC+3:30 (IRST)

Beyg Baghlu (Persian: بيگ باغلو) (Note: Also romanized as Beyg Bāghlū; also known as Beybaghli, also romanized as Beybağlı) is a village in Gug Tappeh Rural District of the Central District in Bileh Savar County, Ardabil province, Iran.

Beyg Baghlu is between the two cities of Germi and Bileh Savar north of Ardabil, on the Iranian Azerbaijan–Republic of Azerbaijan border. The village is home to Beybagli tribe, one of the 32 tribes of the Turkish Shahseven tribal confederacy of Mughan. Its people are engaged in traditional farming and herding practices. Wheat, barley, lentils, and peas are grown. The village's dairy products are milk, cheese, butter, cream and yoghurt.

== Demographics ==
=== Population ===
At the time of the 2006 National Census, the village's population was 19 in seven households. The following census in 2011 counted the population as below the reporting threshold. The 2016 census measured the population of the village again as below the reporting threshold.
