= Para Qeshlaq-e Sofla =

Village in Ardabil province, Iran

Para Qeshlaq-e Sofla Persian: پاراقشلاق سفلي
- Village
- Location within Iran
- Coordinates: 39°09′45″N 47°56′20″E
- Country: Iran
- Province: Ardabil
- County: Bileh Savar
- District: Central
- Rural District: Anjirlu

Population (2016)
  - Total: 55
- Time zone: UTC+3:30 (IRST)

Para Qeshlaq-e Sofla (Persian: پاراقشلاق سفلي) (Note: Also romanized as Pārā Qeshlāq-e Soflá; also known as Pāreh Qeshlāq-e Soflā) is a village in Anjirlu Rural District of the Central District in Bileh Savar County, Ardabil province, Iran.

== Demographics ==
=== Population ===
At the time of the 2006 National Census, the village's population was 54 in 14 households. The following census in 2011 counted 56 people in 14 households. The 2016 census measured the population of the village as 55 people in 15 households.
