= Zargar, Ardabil =

Village in Ardabil province, Iran

Zargar Persian: زرگر
- Village
- Location within Iran
- Coordinates: 39°21′19″N 48°17′51″E
- Country: Iran
- Province: Ardabil
- County: Bileh Savar
- District: Central
- Rural District: Gug Tappeh

Population (2016)
  - Total: 829
- Time zone: UTC+3:30 (IRST)

Zargar (Persian: زرگر) is a village in Gug Tappeh Rural District of the Central District in Bileh Savar County, Ardabil province, Iran.

== Demographics ==
=== Population ===
At the time of the 2006 National Census, the village's population was 926 in 197 households. The following census in 2011 counted 957 people in 265 households. The 2016 census measured the population of the village as 829 people in 232 households.
