= Bobak =

- Gender: Male

Origin
- Origin: Persia
- Meaning: Young father
- Region of origin: Persian

Other names
- Related names: Babak

Bobak is a given name and a surname.

In Persian, it is a male given name and a variant of Babak, which is derived from the Old Persian Papak, meaning 'young father'.

In Polish, Bobak is a surname, derived from the Slavic word bob, meaning "bean" or "broad bean".

== Given name ==
- Bobak Ferdowsi (born 1979), American systems engineer
- Bobak Kianoush (born 1978), British musician

== Surname ==
- Bruno Bobak (1923–2012), Canadian artist
- Celia Bobak (* 1952), British set decorator and art director
- Jacqueline Bobak (born 1962), American musician
- Katherine Bobak (born 1994), Canadian pair skater
- Molly Bobak (1922–2014), Canadian artist and writer
- Przemysław Bobak (born 1974), Polish diplomat
- Stanisław Bobak (1956–2010), Polish ski jumper

== See also ==
- Babak (disambiguation)
