= Qeshlaq-e Qush Dash Mirzakhan =

Village in Ardabil province, Iran

Qeshlaq-e Qush Dash Mirzakhan Persian: قشلاق قوش داش ميرزاخان
- Village
- Location within Iran
- Coordinates: 39°22′51″N 48°08′10″E
- Country: Iran
- Province: Ardabil
- County: Bileh Savar
- District: Central
- Rural District: Gug Tappeh

Population (2016)
  - Total: 509
- Time zone: UTC+3:30 (IRST)

Qeshlaq-e Qush Dash Mirzakhan (Persian: قشلاق قوش داش ميرزاخان) is a village in Gug Tappeh Rural District of the Central District in Bileh Savar County, Ardabil province, Iran.

== Demographics ==
=== Population ===
The village did not appear in the 2006 and 2011 National Censuses. The 2016 census measured the population of the village as 14 people in five households.
