= Nar Qeshlaqi =

Village in Ardabil province, Iran

Nar Qeshlaqi Persian: نرقشلاقي
- Village
- Location within Iran
- Coordinates: 39°14′00″N 48°06′09″E
- Country: Iran
- Province: Ardabil
- County: Bileh Savar
- District: Central
- Rural District: Anjirlu

Population (2016)
  - Total: 19
- Time zone: UTC+3:30 (IRST)

Nar Qeshlaqi (Persian: نرقشلاقي) (Note: Also romanized as Nar Qeshlāqī) is a village in Anjirlu Rural District of the Central District in Bileh Savar County, Ardabil province, Iran.

== Demographics ==
=== Population ===
At the time of the 2006 National Census, the village's population was 32 in 10 households. The following census in 2011 counted 20 people in seven households. The 2016 census measured the population of the village as 19 people in eight households.
