= Qeshlaq-e Jahan Khanemlu =

Village in Ardabil province, Iran

Qeshlaq-e Jahan Khanemlu Persian: قشلاق جهان خانملو
- Village
- Location within Iran
- Coordinates: 39°13′35″N 48°07′47″E
- Country: Iran
- Province: Ardabil
- County: Bileh Savar
- District: Central
- Rural District: Anjirlu

Population (2016)
  - Total: 39
- Time zone: UTC+3:30 (IRST)

Qeshlaq-e Jahan Khanemlu (Persian: قشلاق جهان خانملو) (Note: Also romanized as Qeshlāq-e Jahān Khānemlū) is a village in Anjirlu Rural District of the Central District in Bileh Savar County, Ardabil province, Iran.

== Demographics ==
=== Population ===
At the time of the 2006 National Census, the village's population was 69 in 17 households. The following census in 2011 counted 57 people in 13 households. The 2016 census measured the population of the village as 39 people in 12 households.
