= Gun Papaq =

Village in Ardabil province, Iran

Gun Papaq Persian: گون پاپاق
- Village
- Location within Iran
- Coordinates: 39°19′07″N 48°11′31″E
- Country: Iran
- Province: Ardabil
- County: Bileh Savar
- District: Central
- Rural District: Gug Tappeh

Population (2016)
  - Total: 462
- Time zone: UTC+3:30 (IRST)

Gun Papaq (Persian: گون پاپاق) (Note: Also romanized as Gūn Pāpāq) is a village in Gug Tappeh Rural District of the Central District in Bileh Savar County, Ardabil province, Iran.

== Demographics ==
=== Population ===
At the time of the 2006 National Census, the village's population was 591 in 126 households. The following census in 2011 counted 551 people in 136 households. The 2016 census measured the population of the village as 462 people in 134 households.
