= Goli Bolagh-e Sofla =

Village in Ardabil province, Iran

Goli Bolagh-e Sofla Persian: گلي بلاغ سفلي
- Village
- Location within Iran
- Coordinates: 39°13′06″N 48°02′02″E
- Country: Iran
- Province: Ardabil
- County: Bileh Savar
- District: Central
- Rural District: Anjirlu

Population (2016)
  - Total: 34
- Time zone: UTC+3:30 (IRST)

Goli Bolagh-e Sofla (Persian: گلي بلاغ سفلي) (Note: Also romanized as Golī Bolāgh-e Soflá; also known as Golī Bolāgh-e Pā’īn and Golī Bolāq-e Soflá) is a village in Anjirlu Rural District of the Central District in Bileh Savar County, Ardabil province, Iran.

== Demographics ==
=== Population ===
At the time of the 2006 National Census, the village's population was 52 in 13 households. The following census in 2011 counted 49 people in 10 households. The 2016 census measured the population of the village as 34 people in nine households.
