= Mandalina =

Mandalina may refer to:

- Mandalina (mythology), a Slavic spirit
- Mandalina, Šibenik, a section of the city of Šibenik, Croatia
