= Akbar Davud-e Qeshlaqi =

Village in Ardabil province, Iran

Akbar Davud-e Qeshlaqi Persian: اكبرداود قشلاقي
- Village
- Location within Iran
- Coordinates: 39°11′34″N 48°05′21″E
- Country: Iran
- Province: Ardabil
- County: Bileh Savar
- District: Central
- Rural District: Anjirlu

Population (2016)
  - Total: 193
- Time zone: UTC+3:30 (IRST)

Akbar Davud-e Qeshlaqi (Persian: اكبرداود قشلاقي) (Note: Also romanized as Akbar Dāvūd-e Qeshlāqī; also known as Akbar Dāvūd and Dāvūd Qeshlāqī) is a village in Anjirlu Rural District of the Central District in Bileh Savar County, Ardabil province, Iran.

== Demographics ==
=== Population ===
At the time of the 2006 National Census, the village's population was 383 in 68 households. The following census in 2011 counted 299 people in 76 households. The 2016 census measured the population of the village as 193 people in 59 households.
