= Fuladlu Quyi =

Village in Ardabil province, Iran

Fuladlu Quyi Persian: فولادلوقوئي
- Village
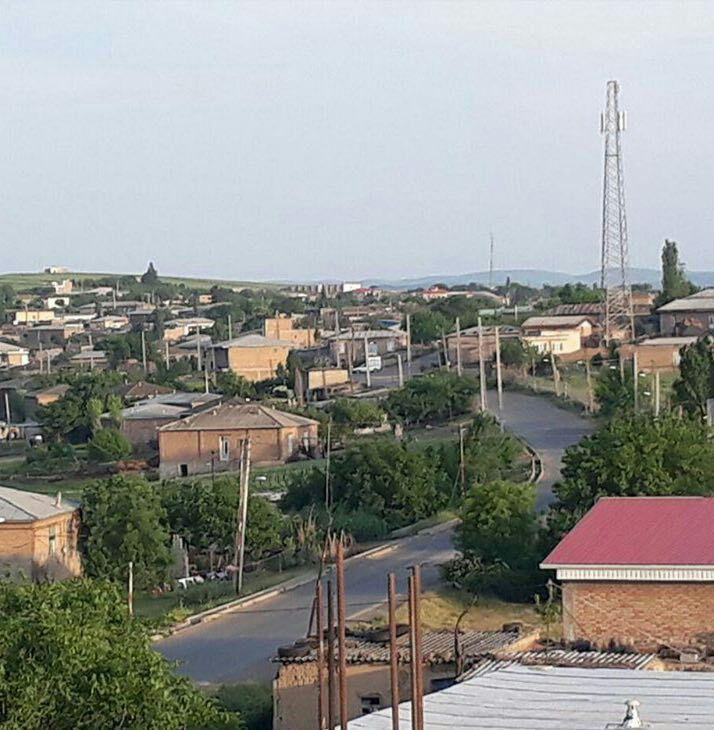
- Fuladlu Quyi village in the summer

- Location within Iran
- Coordinates: 39°20′02″N 48°08′16″E
- Country: Iran
- Province: Ardabil
- County: Bileh Savar
- District: Central
- Rural District: Gug Tappeh

Population (2016)
  - Total: 1,402
- Time zone: UTC+3:30 (IRST)

Fuladlu Quyi (Persian: فولادلوقوئي) (Note: Also romanized as Fulad Luqui and Fūlād Lūqū’ī) is a village in Gug Tappeh Rural District of the Central District in Bileh Savar County, Ardabil province, Iran.

== Demographics ==
=== Population ===
At the time of the 2006 National Census, the village's population was 1,702 in 390 households. The following census in 2011 counted 1,883 people in 508 households. The 2016 census measured the population of the village as 1,402 people in 426 households.
