= Alishan Qeshlaqi =

Village in Ardabil province, Iran

Alishan Qeshlaqi Persian: عليشان قشلاقي
- Village
- Location within Iran
- Coordinates: 39°09′23″N 47°57′10″E
- Country: Iran
- Province: Ardabil
- County: Bileh Savar
- District: Central
- Rural District: Anjirlu

Population (2016)
  - Total: 84
- Time zone: UTC+3:30 (IRST)

Alishan Qeshlaqi (Persian: عليشان قشلاقي) (Note: Also romanized as ‘Alīshān Qeshlāqī; also known as ‘Alīshān Qeshlāq) is a village in Anjirlu Rural District of the Central District in Bileh Savar County, Ardabil province, Iran.

== Demographics ==
=== Population ===
At the time of the 2006 National Census, the village's population was 133 in 23 households. The following census in 2011 counted 112 people in 25 households. The 2016 census measured the population of the village as 84 people in 25 households.
