= Qeshlaq-e Hadli =

Village in Ardabil province, Iran

Qeshlaq-e Hadli Persian: قشلاق هدلي
- Village
- Country: Iran
- Province: Ardabil
- County: Bileh Savar
- District: Central
- Rural District: Anjirlu

Population (2016)
  - Total: 38
- Time zone: UTC+3:30 (IRST)

Qeshlaq-e Hadli (Persian: قشلاق هدلي) (Note: Also romanized as Qeshlāq-e Hadlī) is a village in Anjirlu Rural District of the Central District in Bileh Savar County, Ardabil province, Iran.

== Demographics ==
=== Population ===
At the time of the 2006 National Census, the village's population was 32 in seven households. The following census in 2011 counted 17 people in five households. The 2016 census measured the population of the village as 38 people in 11 households.
