= Jahan Khanamlu =

Village in Ardabil province, Iran

Jahan Khanamlu Persian: جهان خانملو
- Village
- Location within Iran
- Coordinates: 39°12′35″N 48°07′11″E
- Country: Iran
- Province: Ardabil
- County: Bileh Savar
- District: Central
- Rural District: Anjirlu

Population (2016)
  - Total: 180
- Time zone: UTC+3:30 (IRST)

Jahan Khanamlu (Persian: جهان خانملو) (Note: Also romanized as Jahān Khānamlū; also known as Jahān Khānlū and Jehān Khānlū) is a village in Anjirlu Rural District of the Central District in Bileh Savar County, Ardabil province, Iran.

== Demographics ==
=== Population ===
At the time of the 2006 National Census, the village's population was 333 in 62 households. The following census in 2011 counted 280 people in 63 households. The 2016 census measured the population of the village as 180 people in 56 households.
