= Damirchilu =

Village in Ardabil province, Iran

Damirchilu Persian: دميرچيلو
- Village
- Location within Iran
- Coordinates: 39°20′45″N 48°16′16″E
- Country: Iran
- Province: Ardabil
- County: Bileh Savar
- District: Central
- Rural District: Gug Tappeh

Population (2016)
  - Total: 402
- Time zone: UTC+3:30 (IRST)

Damirchilu (Persian: دميرچيلو) (Note: Also romanized as Damīrchīlū; also known as Damīrchelū) is a village in Gug Tappeh Rural District of the Central District in Bileh Savar County, Ardabil province, Iran.

== Demographics ==
=== Population ===
At the time of the 2006 National Census, the village's population was 430 in 88 households. The following census in 2011 counted 426 people in 125 households. The 2016 census measured the population of the village as 402 people in 116 households.
