= Qeshlaq-e Hajji Allahverdi =

Village in Ardabil province, Iran

Qeshlaq-e Hajji Allahverdi Persian: قشلاق حاجي الهوردي
- Village
- Location within Iran
- Coordinates: 39°18′58″N 48°03′08″E
- Country: Iran
- Province: Ardabil
- County: Bileh Savar
- District: Central
- Rural District: Gug Tappeh

Population (2016)
  - Total: 107
- Time zone: UTC+3:30 (IRST)

Qeshlaq-e Hajji Allahverdi (Persian: قشلاق حاجي الهوردي) (Note: Also romanized as Qeshlāq-e Ḩājjī Allāhverdī; also known as Ḩājj ‘Azīzollāh and Ḩājjī ‘Azīz Aqā) is a village in Gug Tappeh Rural District of the Central District in Bileh Savar County, Ardabil province, Iran.

== Demographics ==
=== Population ===
At the time of the 2006 National Census, the village's population was 126 in 25 households. The following census in 2011 counted 138 people in 37 households. The 2016 census measured the population of the village as 107 people in 30 households.
