= Goli Bolagh-e Olya =

Village in Ardabil province, Iran

Goli Bolagh-e Olya Persian: گلي بلاغ عليا
- Village
- Location within Iran
- Coordinates: 39°12′49″N 48°01′54″E
- Country: Iran
- Province: Ardabil
- County: Bileh Savar
- District: Central
- Rural District: Anjirlu

Population (2016)
  - Total: 22
- Time zone: UTC+3:30 (IRST)

Goli Bolagh-e Olya (Persian: گلي بلاغ عليا) (Note: Also romanized as Golī Bolāgh-e ‘Olyā; also known as Golī Bolāgh-e Bālā and Golī Bolāq-e ‘Olyā) is a village in Anjirlu Rural District of the Central District in Bileh Savar County, Ardabil province, Iran.

== Demographics ==
=== Population ===
At the time of the 2006 National Census, the village's population was 62 in 15 households. The following census in 2011 counted 48 people in 16 households. The 2016 census measured the population of the village as 22 people in seven households.
