= Heybat-e Jahan Khanemlu =

Village in Ardabil province, Iran

Heybat-e Jahan Khanemlu Persian: هيبت جهان خانملو
- Village
- Location within Iran
- Coordinates: 39°12′53″N 48°06′06″E
- Country: Iran
- Province: Ardabil
- County: Bileh Savar
- District: Central
- Rural District: Anjirlu

Population (2016)
  - Total: 52
- Time zone: UTC+3:30 (IRST)

Heybat-e Jahan Khanemlu (Persian: هيبت جهان خانملو) (Note: Also romanized as Heybat-e Jahān Khānemlū; also known as Zeynabābād and Zeynābād-e Jahān Khānemlū) is a village in Anjirlu Rural District of the Central District in Bileh Savar County, Ardabil province, Iran.

== Demographics ==
=== Population ===
At the time of the 2006 National Census, the village's population was 112 in 23 households. The following census in 2011 counted 71 people in 19 households. The 2016 census measured the population of the village as 52 people in 18 households.
