= Qeshlaq-e Owch Daraq-e Olya =

Village in Ardabil province, Iran

Qeshlaq-e Owch Daraq-e Olya Persian: قشلاق اوچ درق عليا
- Village
- Location within Iran
- Coordinates: 39°18′25″N 48°04′32″E
- Country: Iran
- Province: Ardabil
- County: Bileh Savar
- District: Central
- Rural District: Gug Tappeh

Population (2016)
  - Total: 20
- Time zone: UTC+3:30 (IRST)

Qeshlaq-e Owch Daraq-e Olya (Persian: قشلاق اوچ درق عليا) (Note: Also romanized as Qeshlāq-e Owch Daraq-e ‘Olyā) is a village in Gug Tappeh Rural District of the Central District in Bileh Savar County, Ardabil province, Iran.

== Demographics ==
=== Population ===
The village did not appear in the 2006 National Census. The following census in 2011 counted a population below the reporting threshold. The 2016 census measured the population of the village as 20 people in five households.
