= Rodau =

Rodau may refer to:

- Rodau (Main), a river of Hesse, Germany
- Rodau (Wümme), a river of Lower Saxony, Germany
