= Qeshlaq-e Alish =

Village in Ardabil province, Iran

Qeshlaq-e Alish Persian: قشلاق عليش
- Village
- Location within Iran
- Coordinates: 39°11′03″N 48°00′03″E
- Country: Iran
- Province: Ardabil
- County: Bileh Savar
- District: Central
- Rural District: Anjirlu

Population (2016)
  - Total: 0
- Time zone: UTC+3:30 (IRST)

Qeshlaq-e Alish (Persian: قشلاق عليش) (Note: Also romanized as Qeshlāq-e Ālīsh) is a village in Anjirlu Rural District of the Central District in Bileh Savar County, Ardabil province, Iran.

== Demographics ==
=== Population ===
At the time of the 2006 National Census, the village's population was 19 in five households. The following census in 2011 counted a population below the reporting threshold. The 2016 census measured the population of the village as zero.
