= Qarah Qasemlu =

Village in Ardabil province, Iran

Qarah Qasemlu Persian: قرهقاسملو
- Village
- Location within Iran
- Coordinates: 39°20′05″N 48°14′53″E
- Country: Iran
- Province: Ardabil
- County: Bileh Savar
- District: Central
- Rural District: Gug Tappeh

Population (2016)
  - Total: 1,529
- Time zone: UTC+3:30 (IRST)

Qarah Qasemlu (Persian: قرهقاسملو) (Note: Also romanized as Qarah Qāsemlū) is a village in Gug Tappeh Rural District of the Central District in Bileh Savar County, Ardabil province, Iran.

== Demographics ==
=== Population ===
At the time of the 2006 National Census, the village's population was 1,666 in 346 households. The following census in 2011 counted 1,742 people in 457 households. The 2016 census measured the population of the village as 1,529 people in 450 households.
