= Bibek =

Bibek is a given name popular among Nepali, Bengali and Assamese people in general, and among Indians on a larger scale. It is a regionalised form of Vivek, meaning something to the effect of pity, heartfelt feeling, in Sanskrit. Notable people with this name include the following:

- Bibek Debroy (born 1955), Indian economist and author
- Bibek Diyali (born 1989), Indian cricketer
- Bibek Maitra (1965–2006), Indian political appointee
- Bibek Yadav, Nepalese cricketer

== See also ==
- Bebek (surname)
- Biber (surname)
- Babek (disambiguation)
- Bibel (disambiguation)
