= Boginka =

Slavic fairies/demons of wilderness

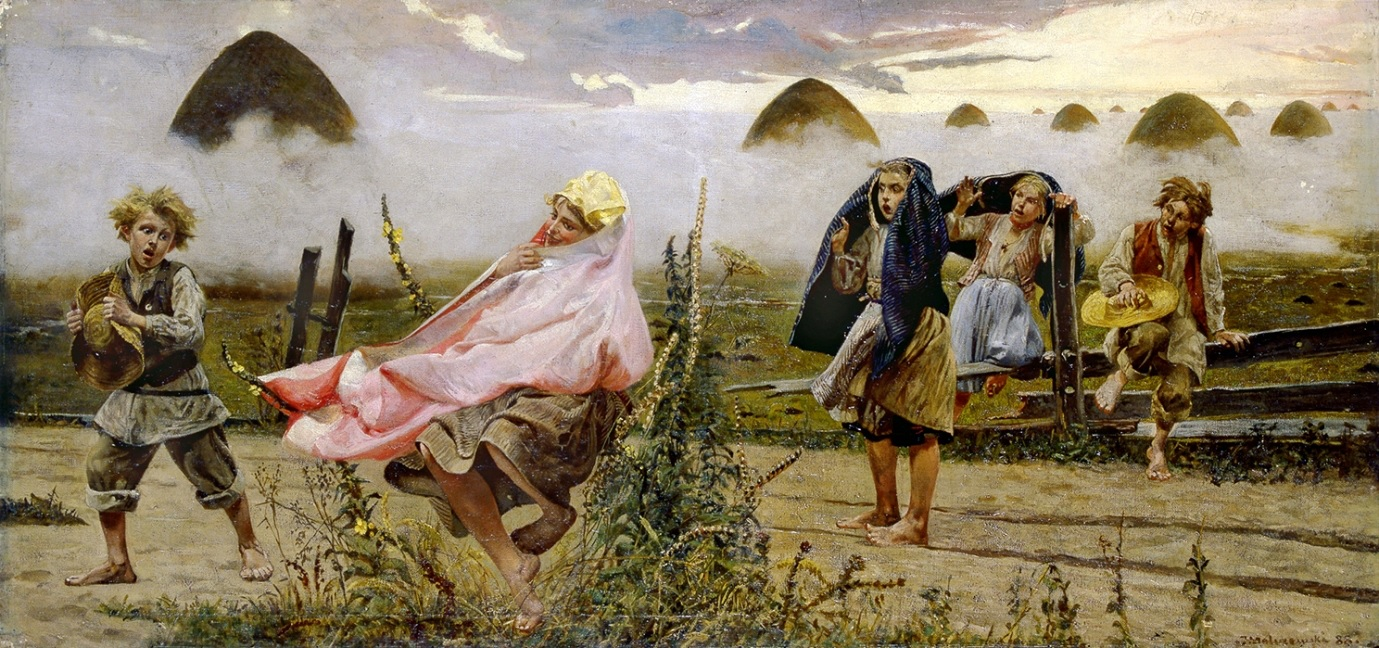
Boginka in Mullein by Jacek Malczewski (1888)

In Polish pagan mythology, boginki (singular: boginka) (Note: also bogunka, bogienka, bogina) are female spirits or demons of wild nature: forest, field, mountains, or water (both of land and sea) and is often a personification of the forces of nature. The word literally means "minor goddess" in Polish and may be translated as "fairy" or "nymph". They were usually imagined as either ugly old hags or pretty young girls, usually naked. They are usually evil.

Some boginki are rusałka, vila, dziwożona, łaskotałka, mamuna, or nawka. The term "boginka" started to be applied to any of them.

Boginki (mamuny) can steal a human child and substitute them. Such substituted child is called boginiak, płonek , podrzutek, or odmieniak ("changeling"). Often children with mental disabilities were thought to be such.

There are various folk means to fend off boginki.

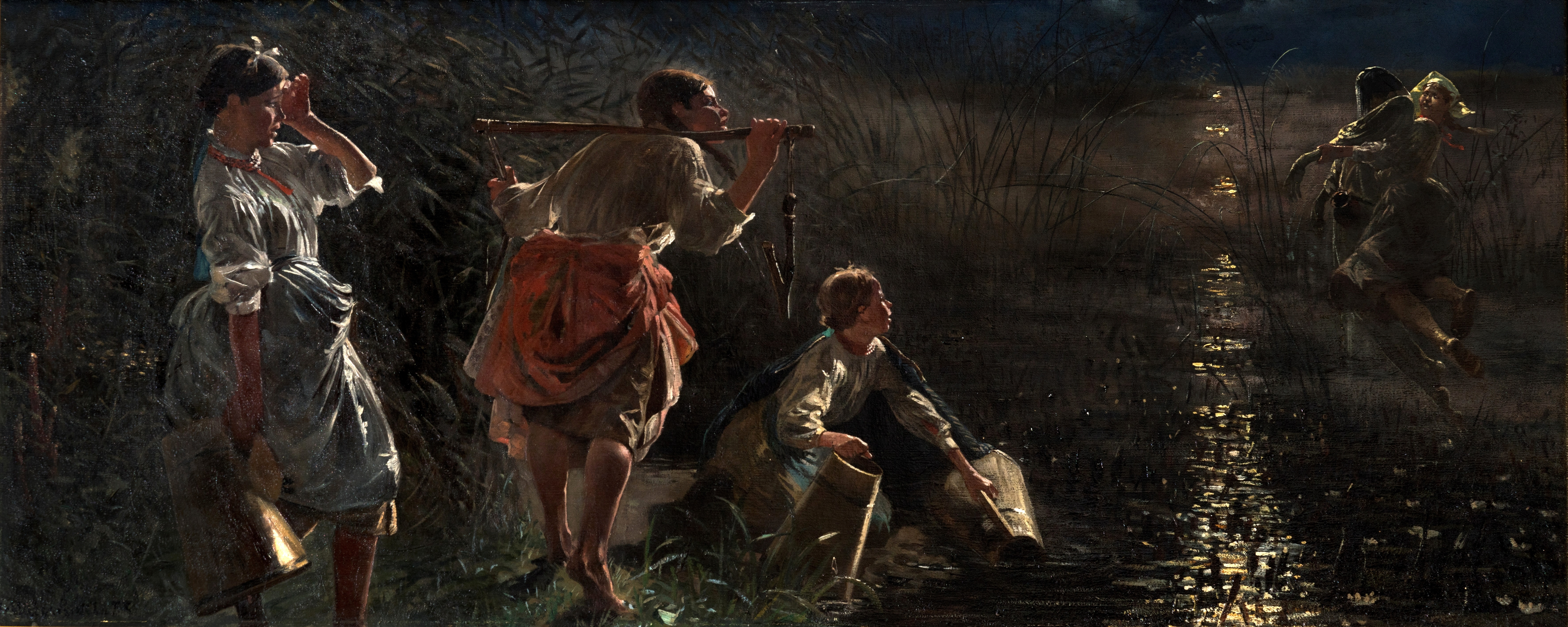
"A drowned man in the arms of a dziwożona", Jacek Malczewski

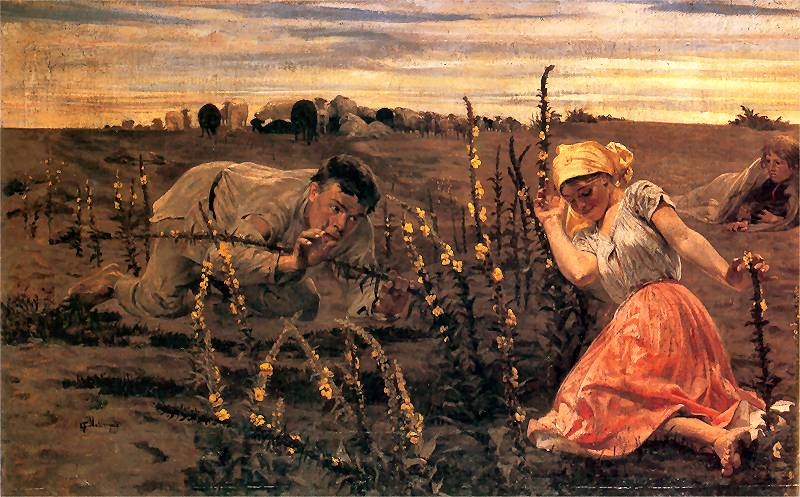
Opętany, Jacek Malczewski (a man bewitched by a boginka)

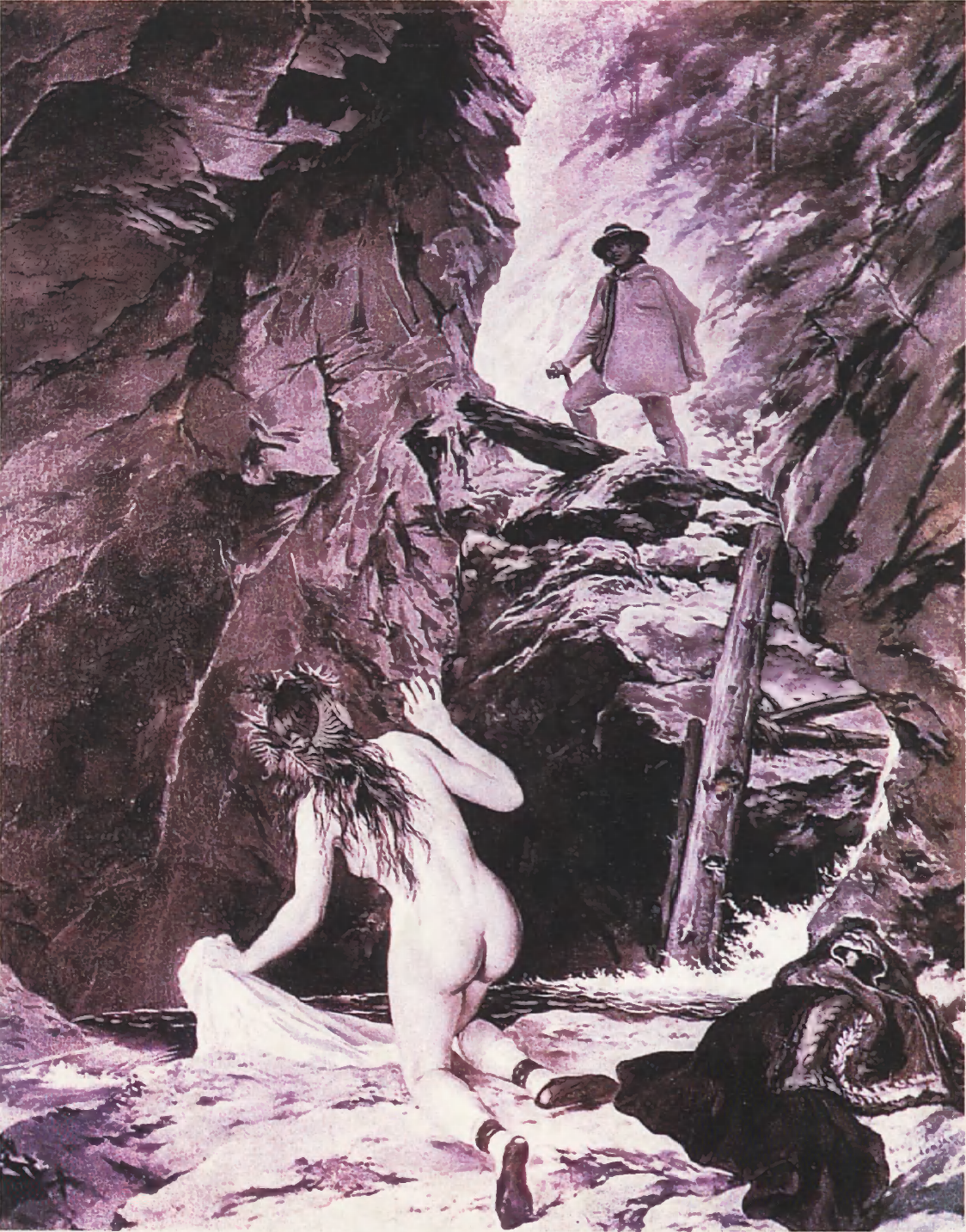
Boginka tatrzańska, Walery Eljasz Radzikowski (1905): a highlander meets boginka of Tatry

== In modern culture ==
- Richard Wagner's opera Die Feen ("The Fairies") is translated as Boginki in Polish
- Czesław Białczyński wrote a parody mythology book Stworze i Zdusze czyli Starosłowiańskie boginki i demony
