= Mamuna =

Mamuna may refer to:

- A Slavic demoness, one of the Slavic fairies
- Mammon (mamona), a Demon of wealth
