= Gharib Hajji =

Village in Ardabil province, Iran

Gharib Hajji Persian: غريب حاجي
- Village
- Location within Iran
- Coordinates: 39°09′18″N 47°58′11″E
- Country: Iran
- Province: Ardabil
- County: Bileh Savar
- District: Central
- Rural District: Anjirlu

Population (2016)
  - Total: 59
- Time zone: UTC+3:30 (IRST)

Gharib Hajji (Persian: غريب حاجي) (Note: Also romanized as Gharīb Ḩājjī; also known as Gharīr Ḩājjī) is a village in Anjirlu Rural District of the Central District in Bileh Savar County, Ardabil province, Iran.

== Demographics ==
=== Population ===
At the time of the 2006 National Census, the village's population was 119 in 24 households. The following census in 2011 counted 108 people in 29 households. The 2016 census measured the population of the village as 59 people in 21 households.
