= Ojaq Qeshlaq =

Ojaq Qeshlaq (Persian: اجاق قشلاق) may refer to:

- Ojaq Qeshlaq-e Khoruslu
- Qeshlaq-e Khan Owghlan
- Ojaq Qeshlaqi
