= Qeshlaq-e Aq Borun =

Village in Ardabil province, Iran

Qeshlaq-e Aq Borun Persian: قشلاق اق برون
- Village
- Country: Iran
- Province: Ardabil
- County: Bileh Savar
- District: Central
- Rural District: Gug Tappeh

Population (2016)
  - Total: Below reporting threshold
- Time zone: UTC+3:30 (IRST)

Qeshlaq-e Aq Borun (Persian: قشلاق اق برون) (Note: Also romanized as Qeshlāq-e Āq Borūn) is a village in Gug Tappeh Rural District of the Central District in Bileh Savar County, Ardabil province, Iran.

== Demographics ==
=== Population ===
At the time of the 2006 National Census, the village's population was 20 in five households. The following census in 2011 counted 25 people in nine households. The 2016 census measured the population of the village as below the reporting threshold.
