= Fredrik Strage =

Swedish journalist and author (born 1972)

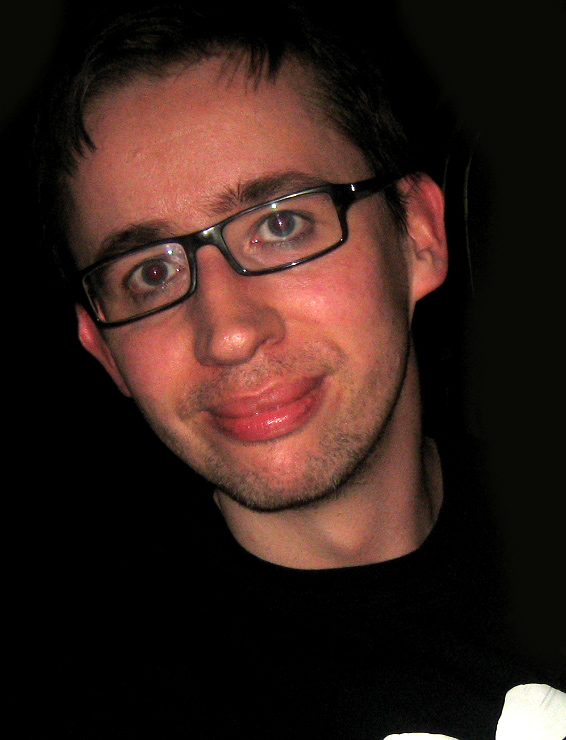
Fredrik Strage in 2008.

Per Fredrik Strage (Swedish pronunciation: [ˈfrěːdrɪk ˈstrɑ̂ːɡɛ]; born 22 December 1972 in Linköping, Sweden) is a Swedish journalist and author who writes about pop culture.

Strage's writing career began in the early 1990s at the Swedish fanzine New Life. He has written for several newspapers and magazines, including Dagens Nyheter, Pop, Bibel, Månadsjournalen, Nöjesguiden, Billboard, Café and Sonic.

In 2003 Strage contributed to Belinda Olsson's anthology De missanpassade.

In 2016 Strage started the podcast Hemma hos Strage in which he invites artists to his apartment in Stockholm to drink coffee and talk about their favourite songs. Previous guests include First Aid Kit, Susanne Sundfør, Howlin' Pelle from The Hives, Lydia Lunch, Corey Taylor from Slipknot, Douglas McCarthy from Nitzer Ebb, Michael Stipe from REM, Brett Anderson from Suede, Bobby Gillespie from Primal Scream, Nergal from Behemoth, Perturbator and Father John Misty.

== Personal life ==
He is married to Linda Leopold and they have a daughter and a son.

== Books ==
- 2001: Mikrofonkåt, about Swedish hip hop.
- 2005: Fans, a study of idol worship.
- 2009: Strage text, an anthology of his articles on pop music and pop culture.
- 2018: 242, a collection of columns from the daily newspaper Dagens Nyheter.

== Awards ==
- 2001: Nöjesguidens pris for the year's best read, for Mikrofonkåt.
- 2005: Nöjesguidens pris for the year's best read, shared with John Ajvide Lindqvist and Klas Östergren.
- 2008: Stora Journalistpriset as Innovator of the Year (Årets Förnyare), for his list of great moments in rock on YouTube.
