= Qeshlaq-e Pasha =

Village in Ardabil province, Iran

Qeshlaq-e Pasha Persian: قشلاق پاشا
- Village
- Location within Iran
- Country: Iran
- Province: Ardabil
- County: Bileh Savar
- District: Central
- Rural District: Anjirlu

Population (2016)
  - Total: 39
- Time zone: UTC+3:30 (IRST)

Qeshlaq-e Pasha (Persian: قشلاق پاشا) (Note: Also romanized as Qeshlāq-e Pāshā; also known as Kūhel Qeshlāq and Kūyl Qeshlāqī) is a village in Anjirlu Rural District of the Central District in Bileh Savar County, Ardabil province, Iran.

== Demographics ==
=== Population ===
At the time of the 2006 National Census, the village's population was 92 in 14 households. The following census in 2011 counted 56 people in 16 households. The 2016 census measured the population of the village as 39 people in 11 households.
