= Bobak (Slavic demon) =

Demon in slavic mythology

Bobak is a demonic creature in Slavic mythology.

== Forms ==
There are several ways of portraying bobak in Slavic culture. Some people believed that it was a bogeyman of some unspecified features, sometimes taking the form of a white dog or a cat. In the south-eastern region of Łódź bobak was said to be the name of so-called ''odmieniec'' and it was considered to be a child replaced by a demoness boginka-mamuna What differentiated the demon from one's progeny were its taciturnity, nonmotility and the lack of appetite, at least when home-dwelers were present. Left alone at home, bobaks were voracious, liked also booze. When such a demonic child grew up, it used to be disabled and mistrustful of people, but it happened rarely as they used to die in their infancy. According to some sources from Wieluń, in turn, bobaks were mischievous dwarves, while in the region of Kutno they were believed to be small devils or diabolic children.
