= Offenbach-Bieber =

Bieber
- Stadtteil of Offenbach am Main
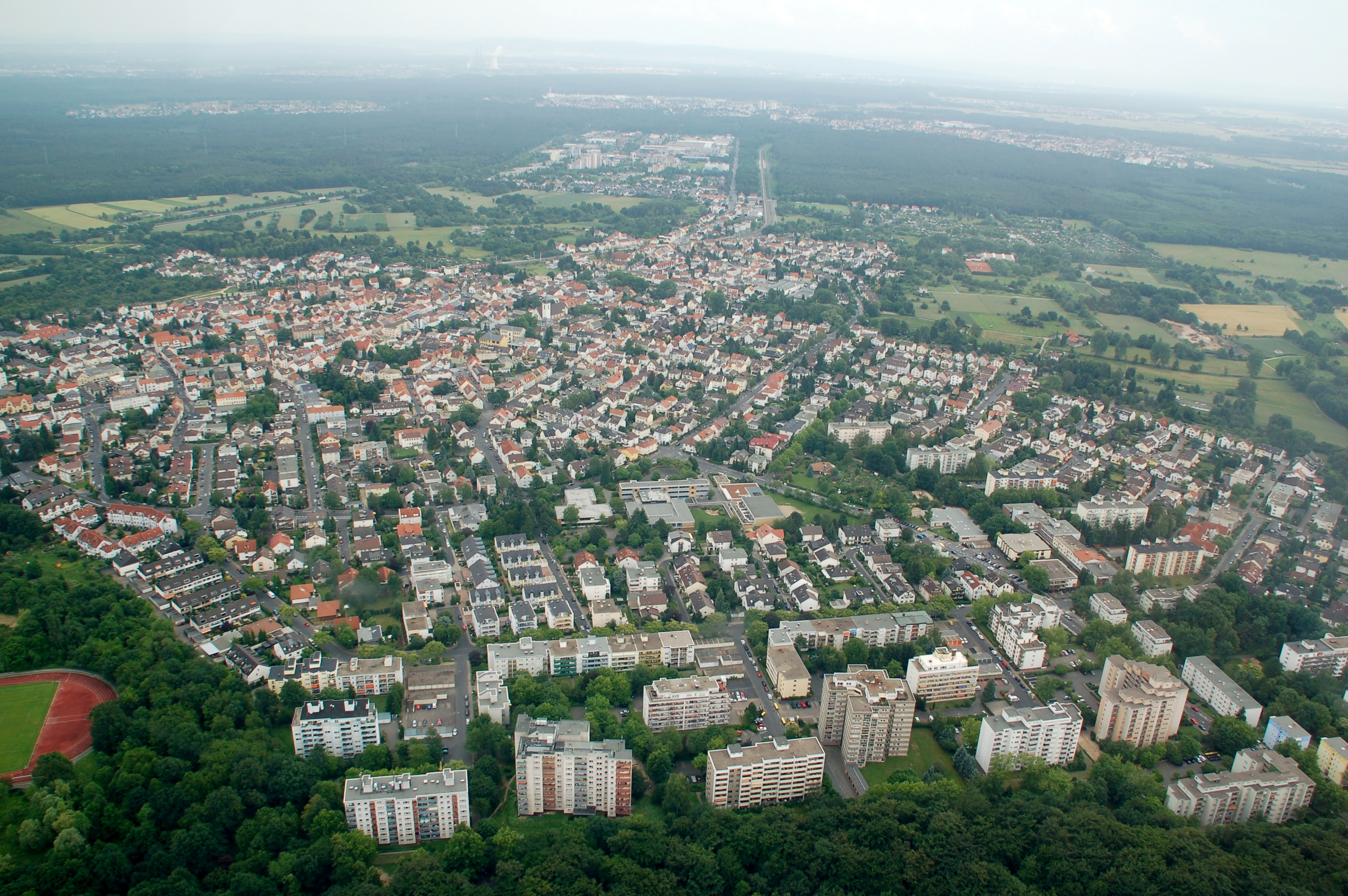
- Aerial picture of Bieber from the west

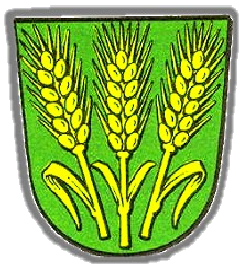
- Coat of arms
- Interactive map of Bieber
- Location within Germany Location within Hesse
- Coordinates: 50°05′N 08°48′E
- Country: Germany
- State: Hesse
- Admin. region: Darmstadt
- District: Urban district
- Town: Offenbach am Main

Population (2020-12-31)
  - Total: 16,137
- Time zone: UTC+01:00 (CET)
  - Summer (DST): UTC+02:00 (CEST)
- Postal codes: 63073
- Dialling codes: 069

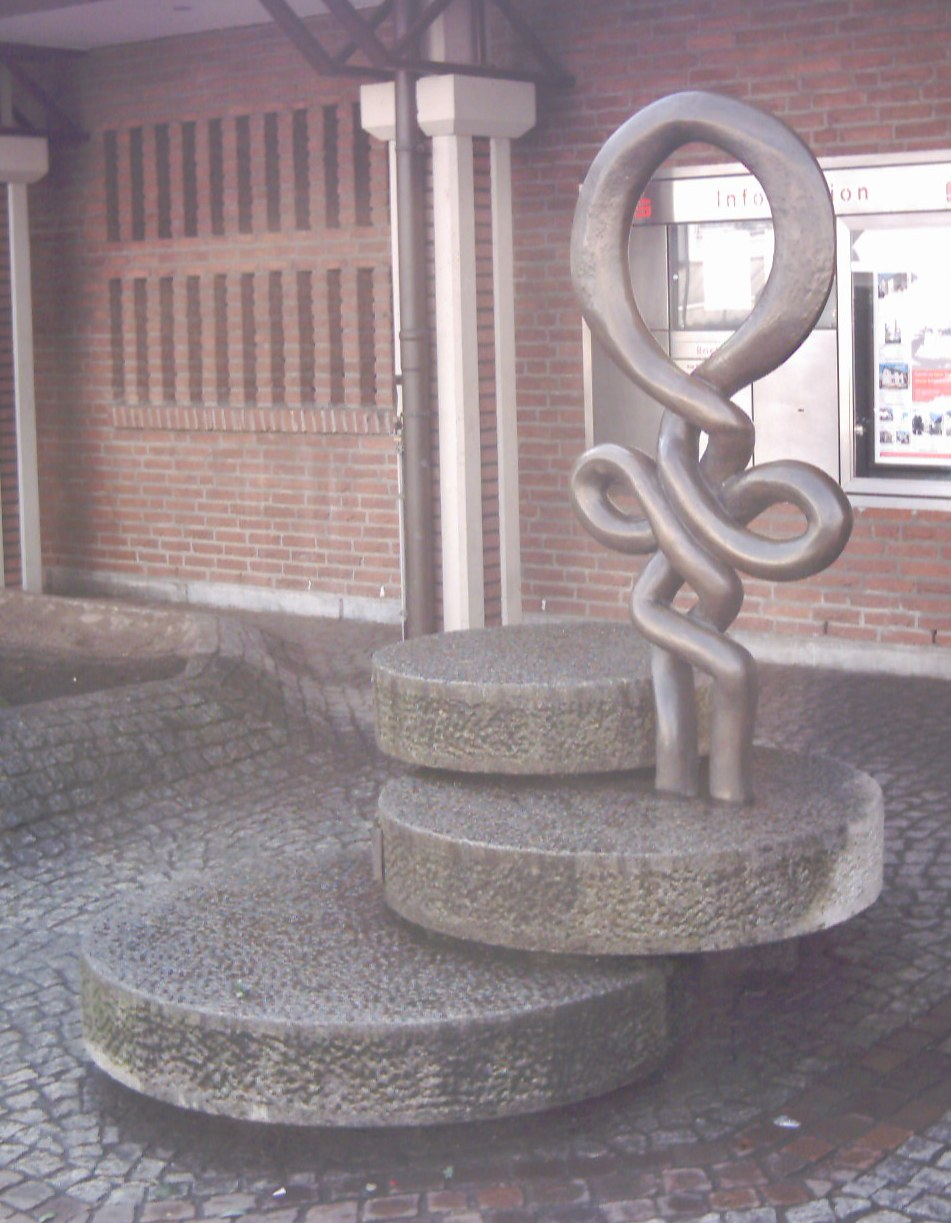
Bieberer Amulett

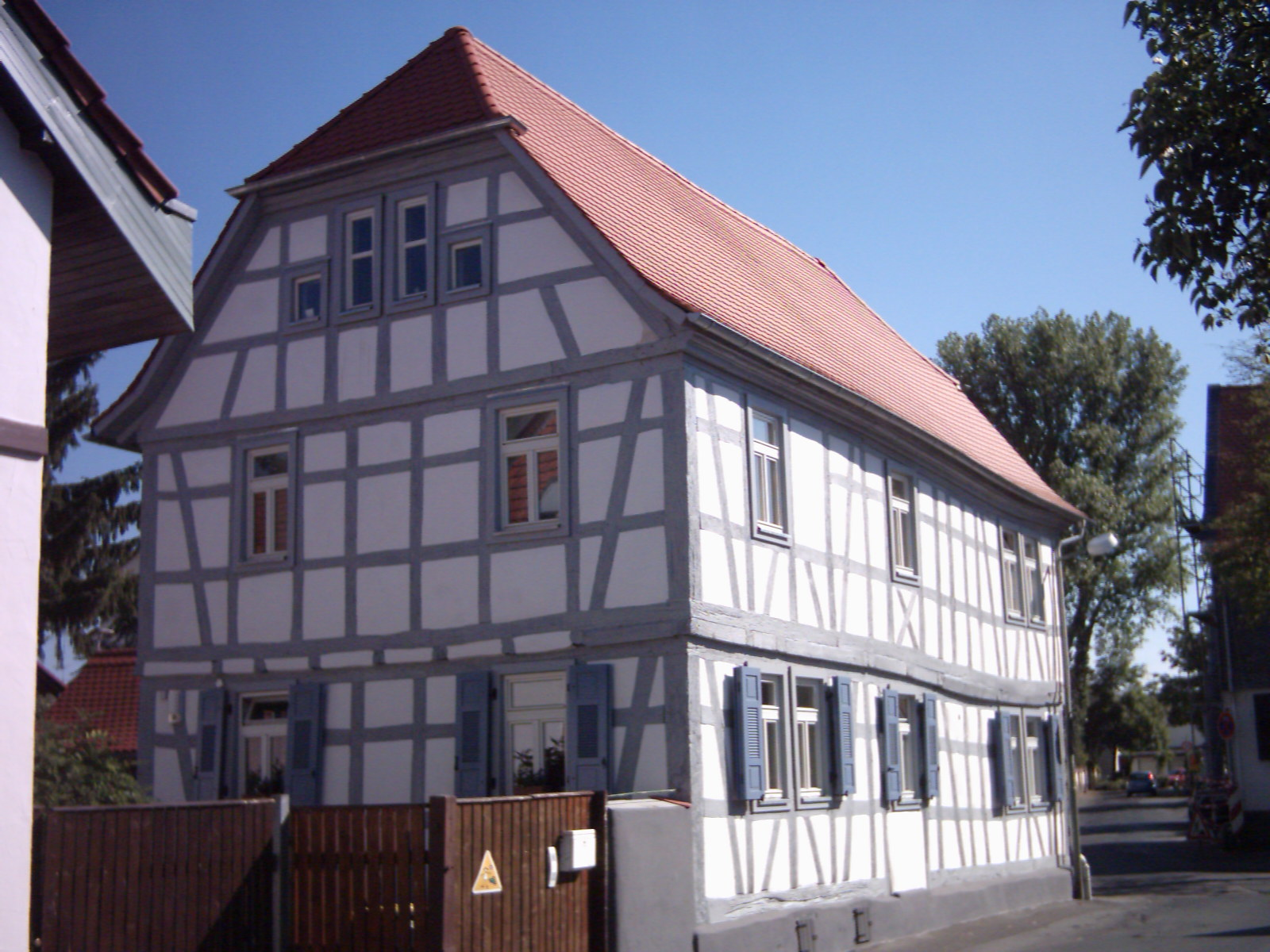
Historical half-timbered building

Bieber is a village in Hesse, Germany, with a total population of 16,137 as of 2020. Since 1938 it has been a Stadtteil of Offenbach am Main.

== Geography ==
A small river, a tributary of the Rodau called Bieber flows through the village.

At the top of the hill Bieberer Berg (elevation 120 m above NHN) stands the soccer-stadium Sparda Bank Hessen Stadion, formerly the Stadion Bieberer Berg, home of the soccer team Kickers Offenbach.

== History ==
The village's name is derived from the Celtic people. Bieber as such was first mentioned in 791 as Biberaha in a donation.

Into the 19th century, Bieber's population was Roman Catholic. Now there is the catholic parish St. Nikolaus and a Protestant parish.

In 1938, the former municipality Bieber was merged with Offenbach.

== Infrastructure ==
=== Transport ===
Bieber is part of the S-Bahn Rhein-Main-System with two S-Bahn stations: Offenbach-Bieber station is near the centre of the village and the other is in the borough of Bieber-Waldhof (3,500 Inhabitants in 2005).
