= Somokluy-e Olya =

Village in Ardabil province, Iran

Somokluy-e Olya Persian: سمكلوي عليا
- Village
- Location within Iran
- Coordinates: 39°09′39″N 47°50′57″E
- Country: Iran
- Province: Ardabil
- County: Bileh Savar
- District: Central
- Rural District: Anjirlu

Population (2016)
  - Total: 87
- Time zone: UTC+3:30 (IRST)

Somokluy-e Olya (Persian: سمكلوي عليا) (Note: Also romanized as Somoklūy-e ‘Olyā) is a village in Anjirlu Rural District of the Central District in Bileh Savar County, Ardabil province, Iran.

== Demographics ==
=== Population ===
At the time of the 2006 National Census, the village's population was 132 in 24 households. The following census in 2011 counted 109 people in 28 households. The 2016 census measured the population of the village as 87 people in 24 households.
