= Gug Tappeh Rural District =

Rural district in Ardabil province, Iran

Gug Tappeh Rural District Persian: دهستان گوگ تپه
- Rural District
- Location within Iran
- Coordinates: 39°22′N 48°12′E
- Country: Iran
- Province: Ardabil
- County: Bileh Savar
- District: Central
- Established: 1987
- Capital: Gug Tappeh

Population (2016)
  - Total: 9,972
- Time zone: UTC+3:30 (IRST)

Gug Tappeh Rural District (Persian: دهستان گوگ تپه) is in the Central District of Bileh Savar County, Ardabil province, Iran. Its capital is the village of Gug Tappeh.

== Demographics ==
=== Population ===
At the time of the 2006 National Census, the rural district's population was 11,391 in 2,335 households. There were 11,688 inhabitants in 3,068 households at the following census of 2011. The 2016 census measured the population of the rural district as 9,972 win 2,953 households. The most populous of its 18 villages was Babak, with 2,656 people.

=== Other villages in the rural district ===
- Beyg Baghlu
- Damirchilu
- Fuladlu Quyi
- Gun Papaq
- Moradlu
- Owdlu
- Qarah Qasemlu
- Qeshlaq-e Aq Borun
- Qeshlaq-e Hajji Allahverdi
- Qeshlaq-e Owch Daraq-e Olya
- Qeshlaq-e Qirlu
- Qeshlaq-e Qush Dash Mirzakhan
- Zargar
