= Babak, Ardabil =

Village in Ardabil province, Iran

Babak Persian: بابك
- Village
- Location within Iran
- Coordinates: 39°28′25″N 48°14′03″E
- Country: Iran
- Province: Ardabil
- County: Bileh Savar
- District: Central
- Rural District: Gug Tappeh

Population (2016)
  - Total: 2,656
- Time zone: UTC+3:30 (IRST)

Babak (Persian: بابك) (Note: Also romanized as Bābak) is a village in Gug Tappeh Rural District of the Central District in Bileh Savar County, Ardabil province, Iran.

== Demographics ==
=== Population ===
At the time of the 2006 National Census, the village's population was 2,673 in 478 households. The following census in 2011 counted 1,852 people in 727 households. The 2016 census measured the population of the village as 2,656 people in 760 households. It was the most populous village in its rural district.
