= Anjirlu, Bileh Savar =

Village in Ardabil province, Iran

Anjirlu Persian: انجيرلو
- Village
- Location within Iran
- Coordinates: 39°10′43″N 48°04′25″E
- Country: Iran
- Province: Ardabil
- County: Bileh Savar
- District: Central
- Rural District: Anjirlu

Population (2016)
  - Total: 688
- Time zone: UTC+3:30 (IRST)

Anjirlu (Persian: انجيرلو) (Note: Also romanized as Anjīrlū) is a village in, and the capital of, Anjirlu Rural District in the Central District of Bileh Savar County, Ardabil province, Iran.

== Demographics ==
=== Population ===
At the time of the 2006 National Census, the village's population was 929 in 180 households. The following census in 2011 counted 1,001 people in 239 households. The 2016 census measured the population of the village as 688 people in 240 households.
