= Ojaq Qeshlaq-e Khoruslu =

Village in Ardabil province, Iran

Ojaq Qeshlaq-e Khoruslu Persian: اجاق قشلاق خروسلو
- Village
- Location within Iran
- Coordinates: 39°09′32″N 47°54′50″E
- Country: Iran
- Province: Ardabil
- County: Bileh Savar
- District: Central
- Rural District: Anjirlu

Population (2016)
  - Total: 159
- Time zone: UTC+3:30 (IRST)

Ojaq Qeshlaq-e Khoruslu (Persian: اجاق قشلاق خروسلو) (Note: Also romanized as Ojāq Qeshlāq-e Khorūslū; also known as Ojāq Qeshlāq) is a village in Anjirlu Rural District of the Central District in Bileh Savar County, Ardabil province, Iran.

== Demographics ==
=== Population ===
At the time of the 2006 National Census, the village's population was 188 in 45 households. The following census in 2011 counted 184 people in 52 households. The 2016 census measured the population of the village as 159 people in 52 households.
