= Bieber (Rodau) =

River in Germany

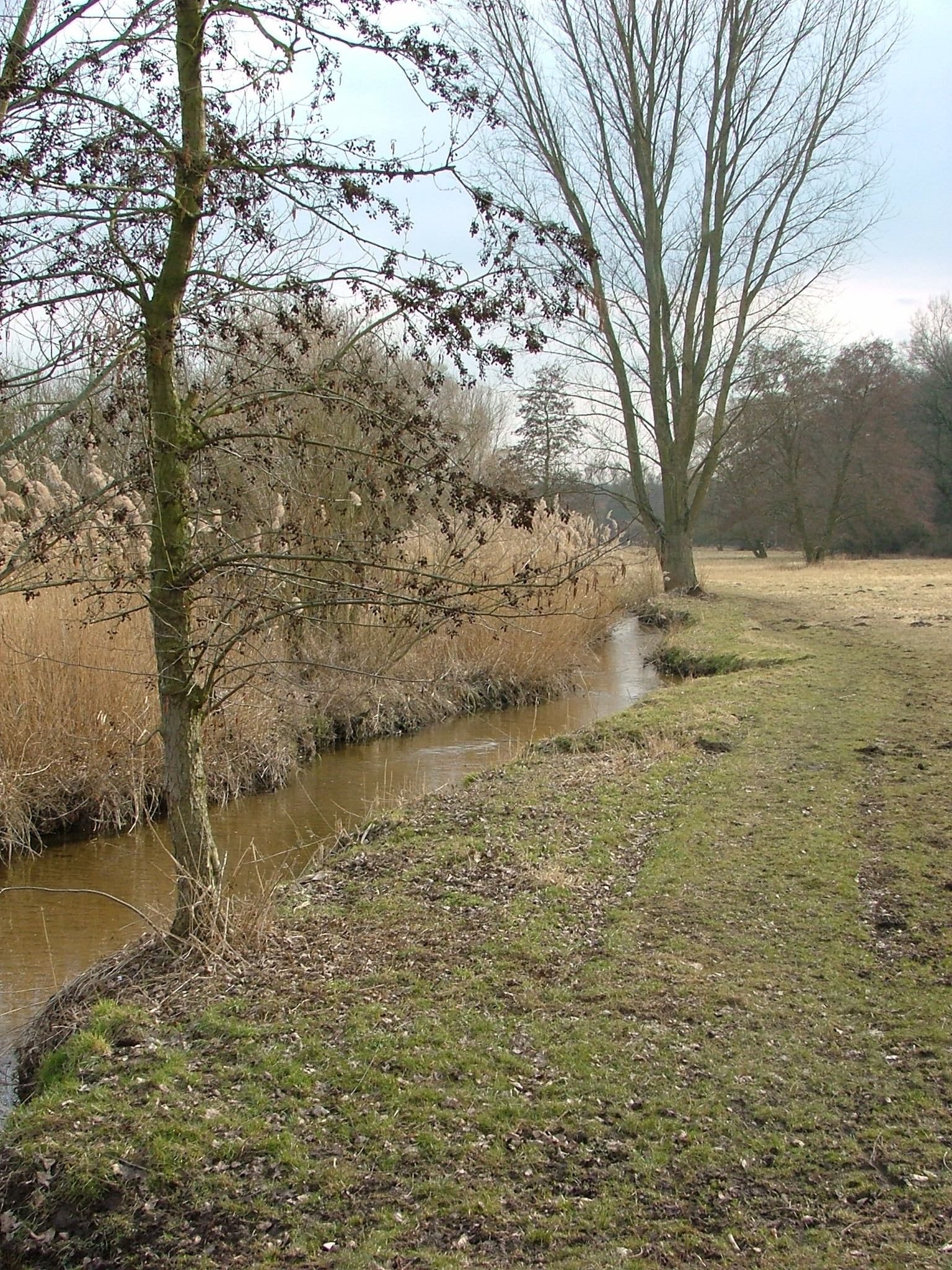
- The Bieber near the Obermühle South of Offenbach-Bieber

Location
- Country: Germany
- State: Hesse

Physical characteristics
- Mouth
  - location: Rodau
  - coordinates: 50.1157°N 8.8351°E
- Length: 16.9 km (10.5 mi)

Basin features
- Progression: Rodau→ Main→ Rhine→ North Sea

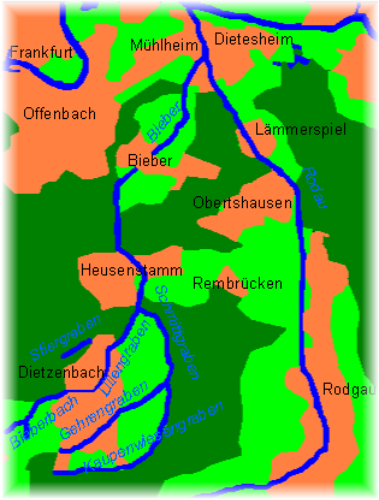
Map of the Bieber

The Bieber is a river of Hesse, Germany. It flows into the Rodau in Mühlheim am Main.

The Bieber rises northeast of Dreieich-Götzenhain in the field "Am green Born" just west of a farm on Kirchborn and flows in a northeasterly direction from there. It takes on the right swelling branch Kirchborn and then pulls through the southern tip of the forest Lichteichen where it flows through the Wollwiesenteich, where it gains from the left another inflow. After re-entry into the field corridor, it soon crosses the county town of Dietzenbach and enters behind it between Dietzenbach and Heusenstamm back into the forest, where she moves past the Patershäuser Hof by its long clearings, here called Liliengraben.

Towards the end of the clearing, it picks up the Schmittgraben from the south and then turns north in the direction of its flow, traverses Heusenstamm, passes the Heusenstammer Schloss and then passes under the crossing A 3. It enters in approximate parallel to the S-Bahn for another forest-and-field section of the Strutäckern in the Offenbach district of Bieber and turns into it to the northeast.

Then Bieber runs from the upper mill underground in a tube and only appears again at the corridor boundary of the place to daylight. After passing under the B 448, it passes through the Feldmark at the cheese mill and accompanied by a wide meadow strip through the forest east of Offenbach. Behind it touches the residential area Markwald of Mühlheim and then flows a little north of it from the left and southwest opposite the Henningweg in the Rodau, which flows into the Main after about a final kilometer Nordlauf then soon.

== See also ==
- List of rivers of Hesse
