= Bebek (surname) =

Bebek is a Croatian surname. Notable people with the surname include:

- Ivan Bebek (born 1977), Croatian football referee
- Željko Bebek (born 1945), Bosnian singer

Ancient Hungarian noble family, the Bebek family, (sometimes referred to as Bubeks) bore this name.

== See also ==
- Bebek (disambiguation)
- Bibek
