= Somokluy-e Sofla =

Village in Ardabil province, Iran

Somokluy-e Sofla Persian: سمكلوي سفلي
- Village
- Location within Iran
- Coordinates: 39°09′52″N 47°52′14″E
- Country: Iran
- Province: Ardabil
- County: Bileh Savar
- District: Central
- Rural District: Anjirlu

Population (2016)
  - Total: 13
- Time zone: UTC+3:30 (IRST)

Somokluy-e Sofla (Persian: سمكلوي سفلي) (Note: Also romanized as Somoklūy-e Soflá; also known as Somoklū, Somoklū-ye Soflá, and Sūmīlkū) is a village in Anjirlu Rural District of the Central District in Bileh Savar County, Ardabil province, Iran.

== Demographics ==
=== Population ===
At the time of the 2006 National Census, the village's population was 83 in 20 households. The following census in 2011 counted 51 people in 13 households. The 2016 census measured the population of the village as 13 people in four households.
