= Bebek =

Bebek may refer to:

== Places ==
- Bebek, Beşiktaş, a historic neighborhood of Istanbul, Turkey
- Bebek Bay, a resort area on the Bosporus in Istanbul, Turkey
- Bebek, Aksaray, a village in the District of Aksaray, Aksaray Province, Turkey
- Bebek, Adıyaman, a village in the District of Adıyaman, Adıyaman Province, Turkey

== Other uses ==
- Bebek (surname), a Croatian surname
- Bebek (family), an ancient Hungarian noble family
- Bebek (album), a 2001 album by İzel
