= Jacqueline Bobak =

American mezzo-soprano singer

Jacqueline Bobak is an American mezzo-soprano singer. She teaches at the California Institute of the Arts.

== Academic career ==
Bobak has a Bachelor of Music degree from Northern Illinois University and master's and doctoral degrees from the University of Illinois at Urbana–Champaign. She was a Lorado Taft artist in residence at The University of Illinois.

Bobak is an associate dean and head of the voice program at the school of music of the California Institute of the Arts, where she has taught since 1991. She has taught at the summer seminar of the Lake Placid Institute; at the International Latvian Young Musicians' Master Classes in Ogre, Latvia; and in universities in Europe and the United States.

== Performance ==
Bobek has had a modestly successful career as a performing artist in the early 21st century, singing opera and chamber music; she specializes in contemporary and avant-garde repertoire. She has appeared with the CalArts New Century Players, with the California E.A.R. Unit, with Electric Phoenix and with Xtet, and has given first performances of works by William Brooks, Ivo Medek, Frederic Rzewski, Wadada Leo Smith, and Chinary Ung.

Bobak has performed at venues including The Hollywood Bowl, The Walt Disney Concert Hall, the Los Angeles County Museum of Art, and the Getty Center.

She has participated in the "Vir2Ual Cage" multimedia project on the works of John Cage, and in the "Green Umbrella" series of the Los Angeles Philharmonic.
