= Joyce Beber =

American advertising executive

- Born: Joyce Sacks; November 20, 1929
- Died: September 17, 2010 (aged 80)
- Education: Columbia University Graduate School of Journalism
- Organization: Beber Silverstein Group

Joyce Beber, born Joyce Sacks, (November 20, 1929 – September 17, 2010) was an advertising executive who co-founded the Beber Silverstein Group and created a number of campaigns for the Helmsley group of hotels. The campaigns promoted Leona Helmsley and her hotel chain; Beber was hired and fired four times by Helmsley.

== Career ==
Born in Brooklyn, Sacks attended yeshiva prior to moving to Manhattan. She earned her bachelor's degree from Purdue University, and received a master's degree in journalism from the Columbia University Graduate School of Journalism. While working in social services at New York City's Mount Sinai Hospital, Sacks met her husband to be, Charles Beber, an intern then who became a gerontologist. They married in 1956, and moved to Miami two years later.

In 1962, she met Elaine Silverstein, with whom she would co-found Beber Silverstein & Partners ten years later, at a time when women headed few agencies, investing $7,000 into the business. With two children in elementary school and no prior plans to start a career, Beber decided to go into the advertising business after hearing a speech in 1971 by Gloria Steinem about women's rights. She got some training from a cousin who owned an advertising agency and started the firm in 1972, where their first client was the American Jewish Committee of which Beber was an officer. Another client was a local florist with a $50,000 ad budget: Ms. Beber’s idea was to sell flowers by subscription, and it worked. Hundreds more clients followed over four decades.

The firm won multiple accounts, including Florida Power & Light, the National Education Association, Humana, Steinway & Sons, Paramount Pictures, the National Organization for Women and Knight-Ridder. The firm also did iconic (and controversial) campaigns for the State of Florida, with the slogan "Florida. The rules are different here." being interpreted as encouraging lawbreaking. She also developed tourism campaigns for Miami that said "Miami. See It Like a Native", a poster of a woman from behind wearing only snorkeling gear and a bathing suit bottom, and a campaign that used the slogan "Miami's For Me". The firm's annual billings reached $100 million.

The agency did work for the Helmsley Hotel group, and was hired — and fired — by hotelier Leona Helmsley on four separate occasions. Beber had to file suit on three occasions to get paid. In one of the firm's first meetings with Helmsley, Beber's conversation was interrupted by a call Mrs. Helmsley took from a hotel guest who had been dissatisfied with a noisy air conditioning unit, and they spoke about Helmsley's frustration with the inadequate quality of the towels the hotel provided. Beber used the conversation as the impetus to develop a campaign for Helmsley that featured her as "Queen of the Palace", carefully watching over every detail at the Harley Hotel in Manhattan. Occupancy shot up from 25% to 87% after just four months, and the campaign was recognized by Adweek magazine as opening "a new chapter in U.S. hotel advertising". and billing the Helmsley Palace Hotel as "The only Palace in the world where the Queen stands guard". A 1985 article in the Chicago Tribune credited the ad campaign with having "made Leona Helmsley more famous than the Helmsley hotel chain for which she speaks". Helmsley fired Beber four different times: once, in order to handle advertising internally; again, after Beber added Donald Trump as a client; next, when she blamed Beber's ad campaign for raising her profile leading to her tax evasion conviction; finally, when Helmsley found out that a man to whom Beber had introduced her (and in whom Helmsley had been romantically interested) turned out to be gay. After one of the firings in 1990, Helmsley told an interviewer for Playboy, "You could say I gave her the royal flush". When the firm was rehired after Helmsley's income tax evasion conviction, Beber developed the slogan "Say what you will, she runs a helluva hotel." Beber's other daughter, Neena, is a playwright.

== Death ==
Beber suffered a stroke in 2003, and died in Miami at age 80 on September 17, 2010, of leukemia. She was survived by her husband, two daughters and four grandchildren. Her daughter Jennifer joined the firm in 1988, later becoming its president.
