= Charles Biefer =

Swiss water polo player

Personal information
- Nationality: Swiss
- Born: 1896

Sport
- Sport: Water polo

Charles Biefer (born 1896, date of death unknown) was a Swiss water polo player. He competed at the 1920 Summer Olympics and the 1924 Winter Olympics.
