= Babak, Hormozgan =

Babak بابك
- Village
- Location within Iran
- Coordinates: 26°31′03″N 57°52′33″E
- Country: Iran
- Province: Hormozgan
- County: Bashagard
- Bakhsh: Central
- Rural District: Sardasht

Population (2006)
  - Total: 120
- Time zone: UTC+3:30 (IRST)
  - Summer (DST): UTC+4:30 (IRDT)

Babak (Persian: بابك, also Romanized as Bābak) is a village in Sardasht Rural District, in the Central District of Bashagard County, Hormozgan Province, Iran. At the 2006 census, its population was 120, in 35 families.
