= Anjirlu Rural District =

Rural district in Ardabil province, Iran

Anjirlu Rural District Persian: دهستان انجيرلو
- Rural District
- Location within Iran
- Coordinates: 39°12′N 47°59′E
- Country: Iran
- Province: Ardabil
- County: Bileh Savar
- District: Central
- Established: 1987
- Capital: Anjirlu

Population (2016)
  - Total: 2,951
- Time zone: UTC+3:30 (IRST)

Anjirlu Rural District (Persian: دهستان انجيرلو) is in the Central District of Bileh Savar County, Ardabil province, Iran. Its capital is the village of Anjirlu.

== Demographics ==
=== Population ===
At the time of the 2006 National Census, the rural district's population was 4,368 in 852 households. There were 4,049 inhabitants in 981 households at the following census of 2011. The 2016 census measured the population of the rural district as 2,951 in 932 households. The most populous of its 26 villages was Qiz Qalehsi, with 761 people.

=== Other villages in the rural district ===
- Akbar Davud-e Qeshlaqi
- Alishan Qeshlaqi
- Gharib Hajji
- Goli Bolagh-e Olya
- Goli Bolagh-e Sofla
- Hajji Bala Beyglu
- Heybat-e Jahan Khanemlu
- Jahan Khanamlu
- Khakriz
- Masjedlu
- Nar Qeshlaqi
- Ojaq Qeshlaq-e Khoruslu
- Para Qeshlaq-e Sofla
- Qeshlaq-e Alish
- Qeshlaq-e Badeyr
- Qeshlaq-e Hadli
- Qeshlaq-e Jahan Khanemlu
- Qeshlaq-e Pasha
- Somokluy-e Olya
- Somokluy-e Sofla
