= Babak (given name) =

- Pronunciation: Persian pronunciation: [bɒːˈbæk]
- Gender: Male
- Language: Persian

Babak (Persian: بابک) is a common Persian given name for males. It derives from the Middle Persian name Pāpak which means "father"

== People with this name ==
- Babak (c. 222), Persian prince and father (or stepfather) of Ardashir I, founder of the Sasanian Empire
- Babak (Sasanian general)
- Babak Khorramdin (795 or 798–838), Khurramite leader who fought against the Abbasid Caliphate
- Babak Amir-Tahmasseb (born 1976), French-Iranian kayaker
- Babak Hassibi (born 1967), Iranian-American electrical engineer
- Babak Jahanbakhsh (born 1983), Iranian pop singer
- Babak Payami (born 1966), Iranian film director
- Babak Rafati (born 1970), Iranian-German football referee
- Babak Ganjei (born 1978-1979), British artist
- Bobak Ferdowsi (born 1979), American engineer at NASA's Jet Propulsion Laboratory

== See also ==
- Babak (disambiguation)
