= Bruna Beber =

Brazilian poet and writer

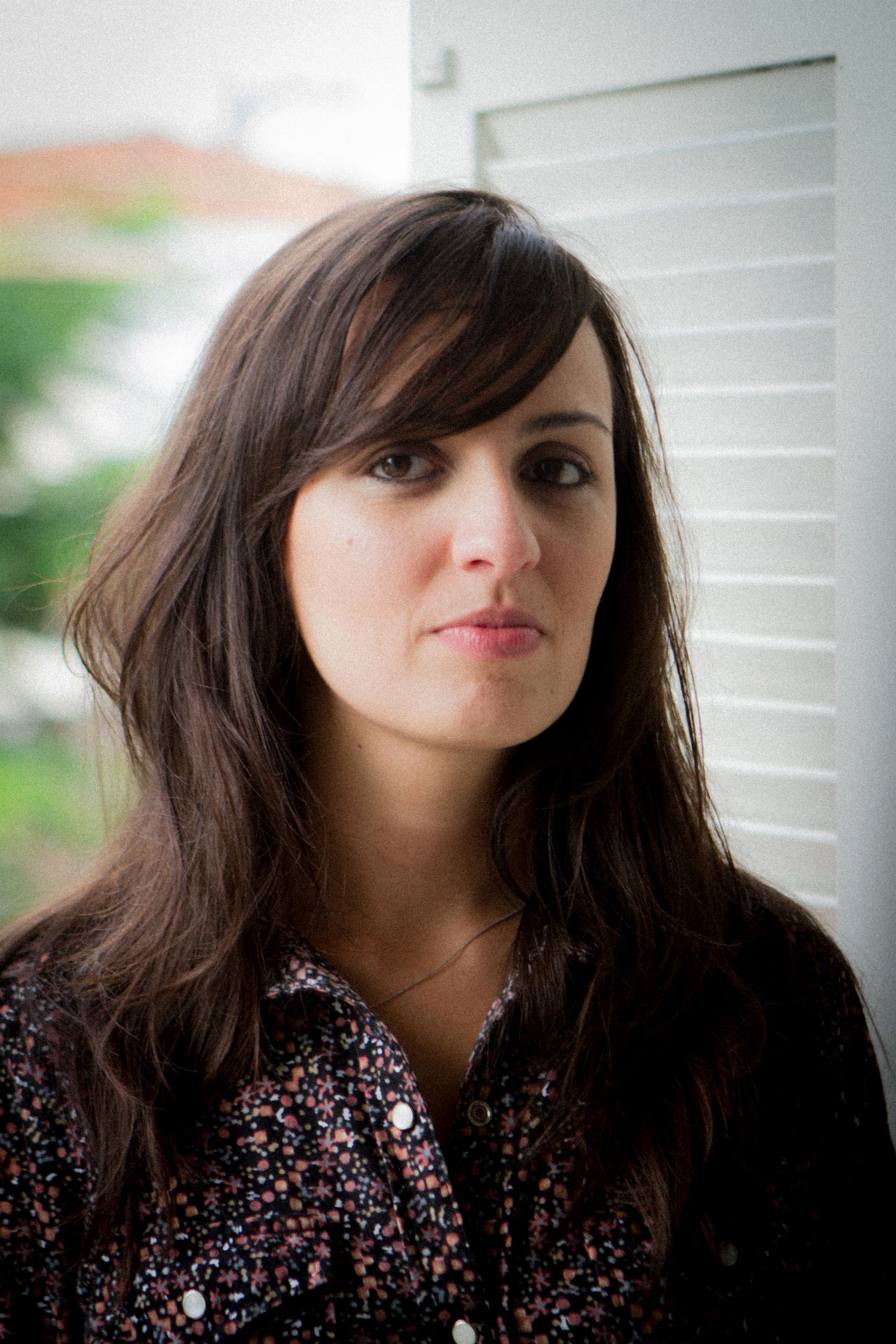
- Bruna Beber, 2013
- Born: Bruna Beber Franco Alexandrino de Lima; March 5, 1984 (age 42); Duque de Caxias, Rio de Janeiro, Brazil
- Occupations: Poet, writer
- Website: www.brunabeber.com

Bruna Beber Franco Alexandrino de Lima (Duque de Caxias, March 5, 1984) is a Brazilian poet and writer.

Bruna Beber collaborated, during the 2000s, with several websites and literature, poetry, music and Internet magazines. In September 2006, she published her poetry debut book, A fila sem fim dos demônios descontentes. She curated the exhibition Blooks - Letras na rede, alongside the poet Omar Salomão, in September 2007, under the coordination of Heloísa Buarque de Hollanda. She was the winner of the 2nd QUEM Acontece Award in the literary revelation category of 2008.

Her poems were translated and published in anthologies and websites in Argentina, Germany, Italy, Mexico, Portugal, and the United States.

== Works ==
- Rapapés & apupos (Edições Moinhos de Vento, 2010; Ed. 7Letras, 2012)
- Balés (Ed. Língua Geral, 2009)
- A fila sem fim dos demônios descontentes (Ed. 7Letras, 2006)
- Rua da PadariA (Ed. Record, 2013)
- Ladainha (Ed. Record, 2017)

=== Anthologies (poems) ===
- Otra línea de fuego (Ed. Selo Maremoto, 2009), antologia espanhola de poesia brasileira contemporânea organizada por Heloísa Buarque de Hollanda e Teresa Arjón, em edição bilíngue.
- Traçados Diversos, antologia de poesia contemporânea (Ed. Scipione, 2009)
- Poesia do dia: poetas de hoje para leitores de agora (Ed. Ática, 2008)
- Caos portátil: poesía contemporánea del Brasil (Ed. El Billar de Lucrecia, 2007)

=== Anthologies (crônicas) ===
- BlablaBlogue (Editora Terracota, maio 2009), organizada por Nelson de Oliveira
- Pitanga [edição independente da loja Pitanga - Lisboa/Portugal, outubro de 2009)
