= Sigmar Bieber =

German footballer

Personal information
- Date of birth: 4 January 1968 (age 58)
- Place of birth: Gelsenkirchen, Germany
- Position: Midfielder

Youth career
- –1987: FC Schalke 04

Senior career*
Years	Team	Apps	(Gls)
1987–1991	FC Schalke 04		
1991–1993	Wuppertaler SV		
1993–1994	VfL Gevelsberg		
1994–1996	FC Gütersloh		
1996–1999	Rot-Weiß Oberhausen		
1999–2000	Rot-Weiss Essen		
2000–2001	SC Westfalia Herne		
- * Club domestic league appearances and goals

Sigmar Bieber (born 4 January 1968) is a retired German football midfielder.
