= Babak (Sasanian officer) =

6th-century Sasanian official

Head of the Department of the Warriors
- Monarch: Khosrow I
- Preceded by: Office established

Personal details
- Citizenship: Sasanian Empire
- Parent: Biru (father)
- Occupation: Priest
- Known for: Role in reforms of the Sasanian army

Military service
- Allegiance: Sasanian Empire
- Branch/service: Sasanian army

Babak was a 6th-century Sasanian officeholder known for his major role in the reformation of the Sasanian military during Khosrow I's reign.

== Name ==
His name has been recorded as "Babak, son of ʾlbyrwʾn (Arabic: البيروان)" by al-Tabari. This Arabic corruption is reconstructed as Bērawān by Theodor Nöldeke and Behruwān (بهروان) by Ahmad Tafazzoli. Mohammad-Taqi Bahar explains it as "Babak, son of Bīrū (Persian: بیرو)", which could be an alternative form of Wīrū (ویرو), a Persian male given name mentioned in Vis o Ramin. The final -ān would be the suffix meaning "son of". Bābak is the Arabic and New Persian form of the Middle Persian Pābag.

== Career ==
Al-Tabari describes Babak as "a man of noble birth known for his magnanimous qualities and capability". He is mentioned as a secretary, but according to the Shahnameh, Babak was a priest (mowbed). In an effort for reforming the military and establishing a standing army, King Khosrow I put Babak in charge of the Department of the Warriors (Middle Persian: Dīwān ī Gund). A "list" for the pieces of equipment for the aswaran cavalry was written.

There is an account in al-Tabari's Tarikh al-Tabari and Ferdowsi's Shahnameh, describing a military parade of the fully armed Sasanian cavalrymen before Babak in order to present themselves for inspection after the military reforms. As they appeared before Babak, he sent them away, demanding that "everyone", including a properly armed King Khosrow I, be present on the following day. Failing this, the king would not receive his annual salary, which was based on the 4,000 dirhams received by a cavalry officer, plus one extra dirham. Khosrow I acquiesced, and participated, fully armed, in the parade next day; this story demonstrated that everyone, including the king, was subject to the royal law.
