= Andy Bieber =

Canadian football player (1917–1985)

Profile
- Position: Halfback

Personal information
- Born: May 14, 1917; Winnipeg, Manitoba, Canada
- Died: November 18, 1985 (aged 68); Winnipeg, Manitoba, Canada

Career history
- 1936–1941: Winnipeg Blue Bombers

Awards and highlights
- Grey Cup champion (1939, 1941)

Andrew Godfrey Bieber (May 14, 1917 – November 18, 1985) was a Canadian professional football player who played for the Winnipeg Blue Bombers. He won the Grey Cup with them in 1939 and 1941. He is a member of the Blue Bombers Hall of Fame.
