= Bieber (Haune) =

River in Germany

Location
- Country: Germany
- State: Hesse

Physical characteristics
- Mouth
  - location: Haune
  - coordinates: 50.5837°N 9.7696°E
- Length: 15.9 km (9.9 mi)

Basin features
- Progression: Haune→ Fulda→ Weser→ North Sea

The Bieber is a river of Hesse, Germany. It flows into the Haune's left bank northeast of Fulda.

== See also ==
- List of rivers of Hesse
