= George Edward Biber =

German writer

George Edward Biber (born Georg Eduard Biber; 4 September 1801 – 19 January 1874) was a German writer who migrated to the United Kingdom, where he became a man of letters and Anglican priest.

== Life ==
Biber was born in 1801 at Ludwigsburg, Duchy of Württemberg, to Johann Gottlieb Biber and Anna Maria Gugel. After studying at the Lyceum there, where his father was then professor, he entered the university of Tübingen. He took there the degree of Ph.D., and subsequently received an LL.D. at the university of Göttingen.

For political reasons, Biber left Württemberg, first for Italy, and then for the Grisons, where for several months he lay low in a farmhouse. He then to Yverdun, where he became a master in one of the institutions set up by Heinrich Pestalozzi. In 1826 he accepted the offer of a tutorship in England. He became the head of a classical school at Hampstead, and later at Coombe Wood.

On his arrival in England Biber lacked religious convictions, but joined the Church of England. Naturalised by act of parliament, he was ordained to the curacy of Ham, London in July 1839. In 1842 he was appointed to the new vicarage of Holy Trinity, Roehampton, and ministered there for 30 years. He opposed the disestablishment of the Church of Ireland, and took part the establishment of the National Club founded in 1845 by John Campbell Colquhoun; it was a pressure group for Anglicans and other Protestants. He was also a founder of the Metropolitan Church Union in 1849, and in 1850 of the Society for the Revival of Convocation.

Biber was elected a member of the council of the English Church Union in 1863, and was prominent in the case of J. W. Colenso. He resigned his seat in June 1864, finding unacceptable some of his liberal and Anglo-Catholic colleagues.

One of the main writers in the English Review, Biber also contributed to the Churchman's Magazine, the Literary Churchman, the Church Review, the Colonial Church Chronicles and to the English Churchman. He edited John Bull, another periodical for which he wrote, from 1848 to 1856.

In later life, Biber lived for periods in Brighton. Early in 1872 he was promoted by Lord Chancellor Hatherley to the rectory of West Allington, near Grantham. He died there in 1874.

== Works ==
Biber published a major theological work at the time of the Oxford Movement, The Standard of Catholicity, or an Attempt to point out in a plain Manner certain safe and leading Principles amidst the conflicting Opinions by which the Church is at present agitated (London, 1840; 2nd edition, 1844). In 1842 he followed it with Catholicity v. Sibthorp, called in its second edition of 1844 The Catholicity of the Anglican Church vindicated, and the alleged Catholicity of the Roman Church disproved. This work was addressed to Richard Waldo Sibthorp, an Anglican cleric who in 1841 had converted to Catholicism (temporarily as it turned out).

On this issue, of the essential meaning of "catholicity" in Christianity, Biber's line was orthodox for the High Church faction of the Church of England. Other views of his were in some ways close to the Tractarians, and he wrote many pamphlets.

Sympathising with the later Old Catholic movement of Germany, Biber carried on a Latin correspondence with one of its leader, Michaelis. It was published as De Unitate Ecclesiæ, et de Concilio Œcumenico libero congregando Epistola;'an English version was called, On the Unity of the Church, London, 1871. He attended the Old Catholic congress at Cologne, and he published a German sermon, Ein Wort der Liebe und Hoffnung, English version A Word of Love and Hope, addressed to the Old Catholics of Germany, London, 1872.

Other publications were:

- Beitrag zur Biographie Heinrich Pestalozzi's, St. Gallen, 1827
- The Christian Minister and Family Friend, and Christian Education, (1830), based on lectures delivered in 1828 and 1829.
- Henry Pestalozzi and his Plan of Education, London, 1831
- Sermons for Saints' Days, London, 1846
- The Seven Voices of the Spirit, London, 1857, a commentary on the Apocalypse
- Royalty of Christ and the Church and Kingdom of England, London, 1857;
- Twenty-four Tales of the English Church, London, 1832
- The Supremacy Question, or Justice to the Church of England, London, 1847, expanded in the following year as The Royal Supremacy over the Church, considered as to its Origin and its Constitutional Limits, London, 1848
- Life of St. Paul, London, 1849
- The Communion of the Faithful essential to the Celebration of the Holy Eucharist, London, 1863
- The Veracity and Divine Authority of the Pentateuch vindicated, London, 1863.
- The Supremacy Question considered in its successive Phases, Theocratic, Imperial, or Royal, Papal, and Popular, London, 1865

== Family ==
Biber married Elizabeth Barnes, daughter of William Barnes. They had a son, George Eden Biber (1832–1866), also a cleric, who matriculated at Oriel College, Oxford in 1851. He married in 1856 John [sic] Berry Erskine, and changed his surname to Biber Erskine, for sake of an entail. He was survived by two sons and a daughter of the marriage.

== Notes ==
Attribution

This article incorporates text from a publication now in the public domain: Stephen, Leslie, ed. (1885). "Biber, George Edward". Dictionary of National Biography. Vol. 4. London: Smith, Elder & Co.
