= Friedrich Bieber =

Austrian anthropologist

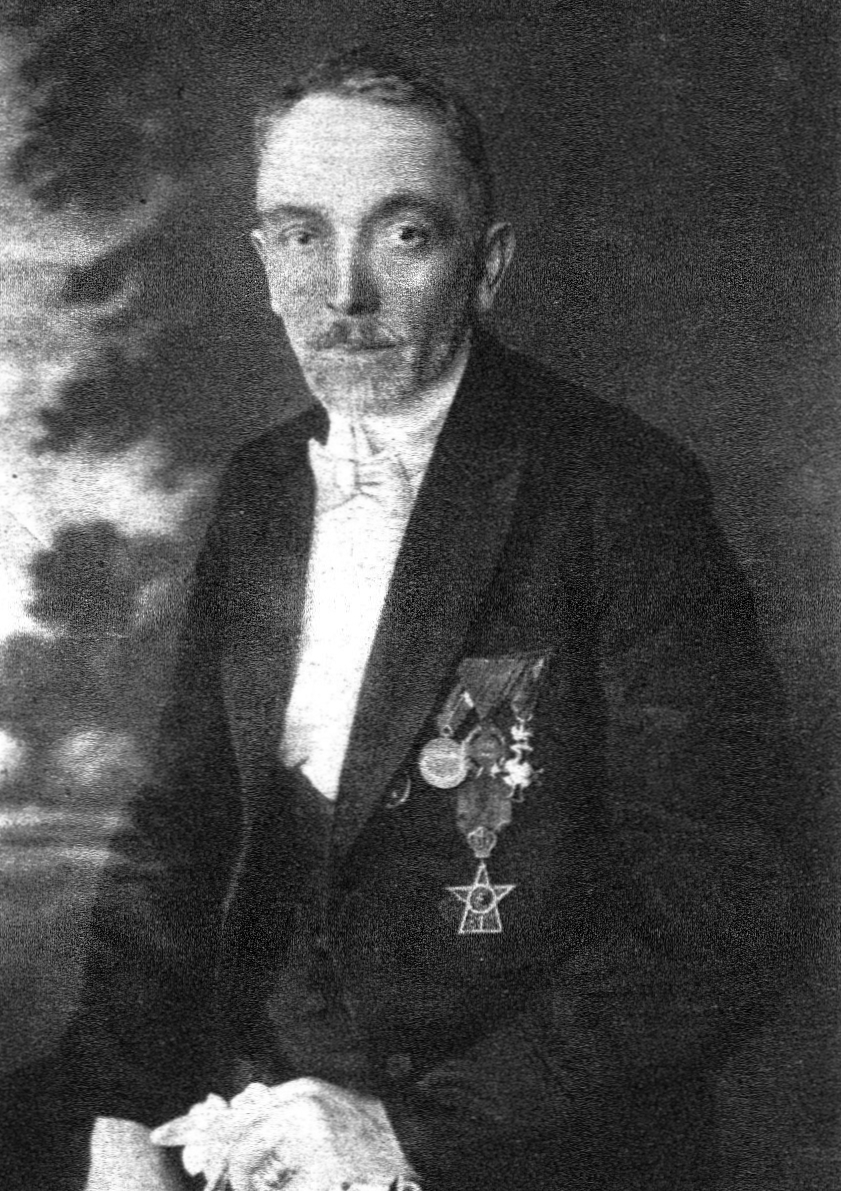
Friedrich Julius Bieber

Friedrich Julius Bieber (24 February 1873 in Vienna – 3 March 1924) was an Austrian anthropologist. He was known for his study of the Kaffa people of south-west Ethiopia.
