= Beber =

Beber is a surname. Notable people with the surname include:

- Ambrosius Beber (fl. 1610–1620), a German composer
- Bruna Beber (born 1984), Brazilian poet
- Dalirio Beber (born 1949) Brazilian politician
- Joyce Beber (1929–2010), an American advertising executive
- Neena Beber, American television producer
- Tonya Van Beber, American politician

== See also ==
- Beber (Ohre), a river in Germany
