= Emilie Bieber =

German photographer (1810–1884)

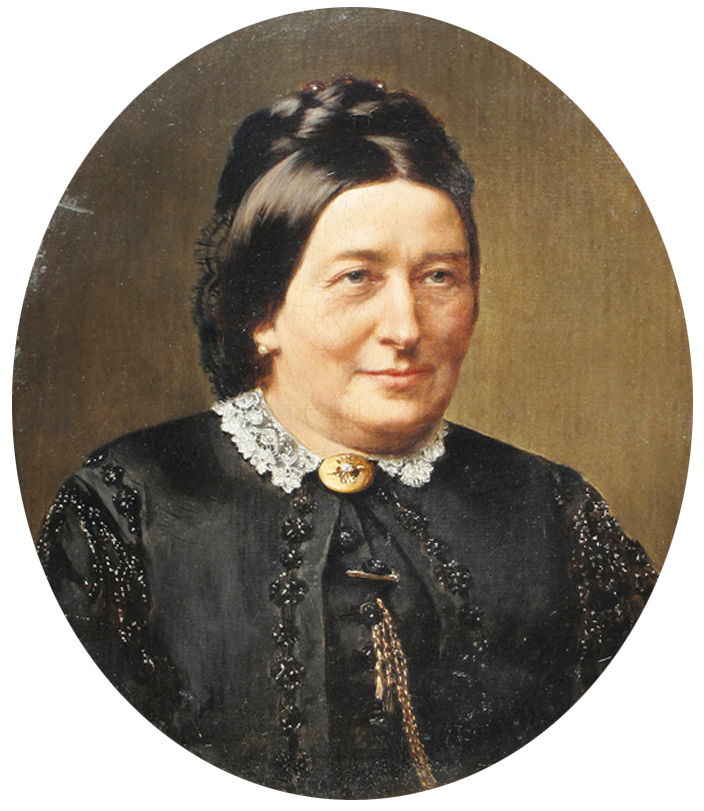
Emilie Bieber

Emilie Bieber (1810–1884) was a German photographer who opened a studio in Hamburg as early as 1852.

== Biography ==
On 16 September 1852, Bieber opened a daguerreotype studio at 26, Großen Bäckerstraße in Hamburg at a time when photography was practiced almost exclusively by men. As a result, she was one of the first women to become a professional photographer in Germany. Initially her business did not do well. Just as she was on the point of selling it, she received encouragement from a soothsayer who saw "many carriages waiting outside her studio." Thanks to such encouragement, she went on to become a successful portrait photographer, specializing in hand-tinted portraits. In 1872, Prince Friedrich Karl of Prussia appointed her court photographer. After moving her studio to 20, Neuer Jungfernstieg, she transferred her business to her nephew Leonard Bieber (1841–1931) who successfully managed the business from 1885, opening a branch in Berlin in 1892.

== Gallery ==
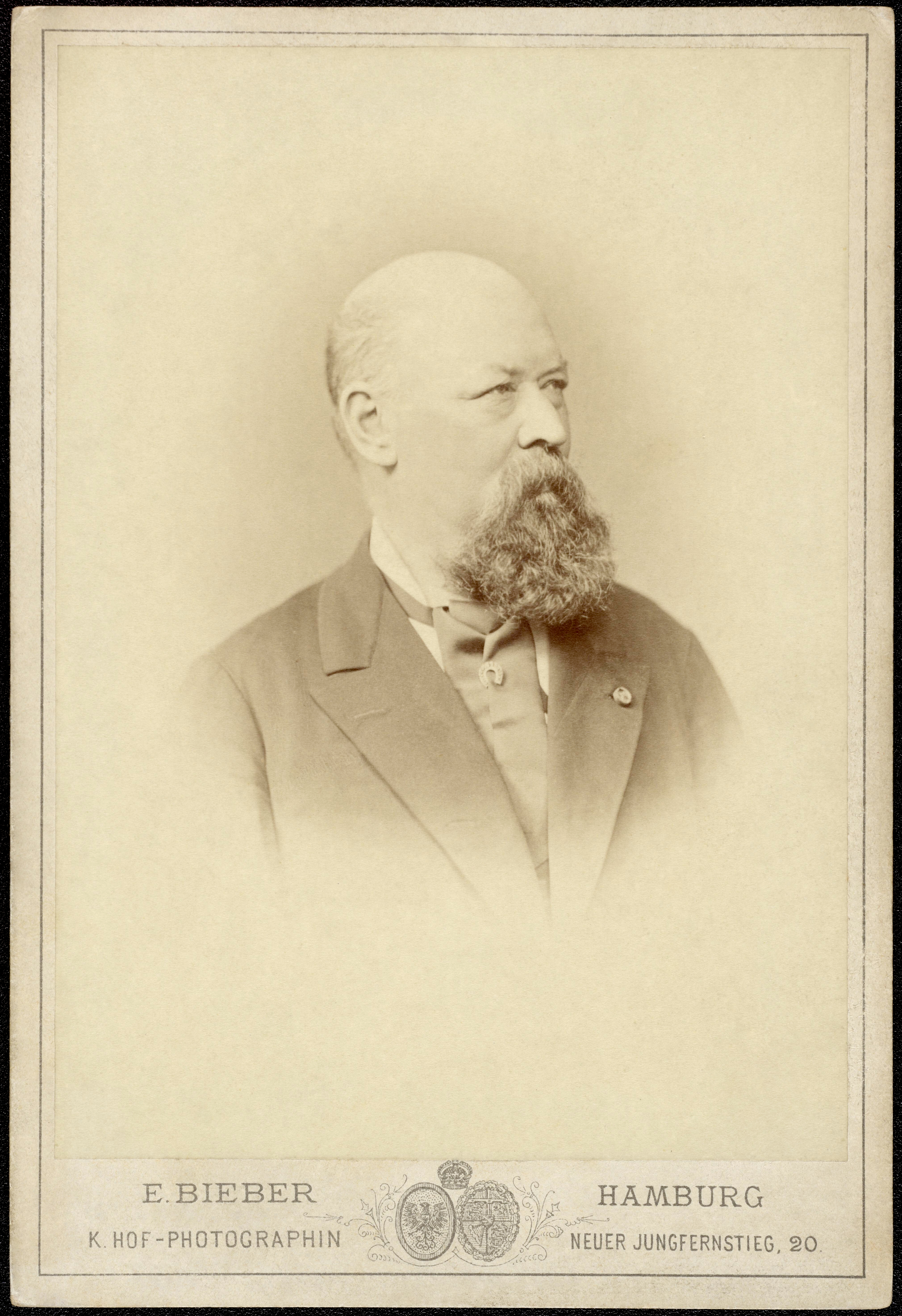
Franz von Suppé

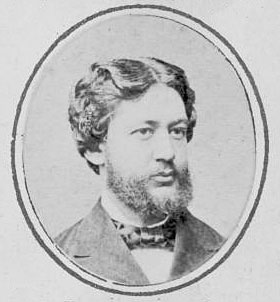
Austrian cellist Louis Hegyesi

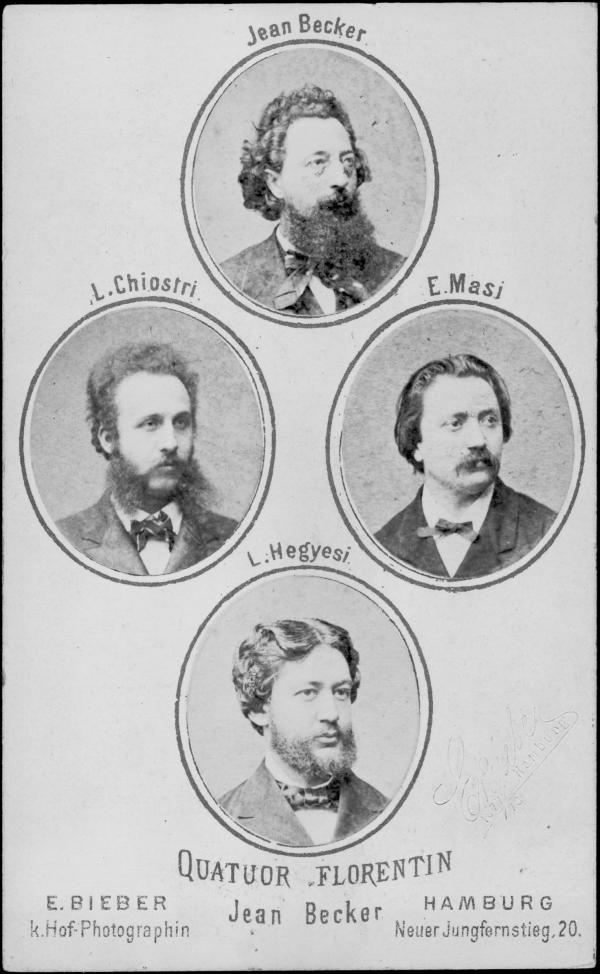
Quatuor Florentin
