= Slavic water spirits =

Spirits in Slavic paganism

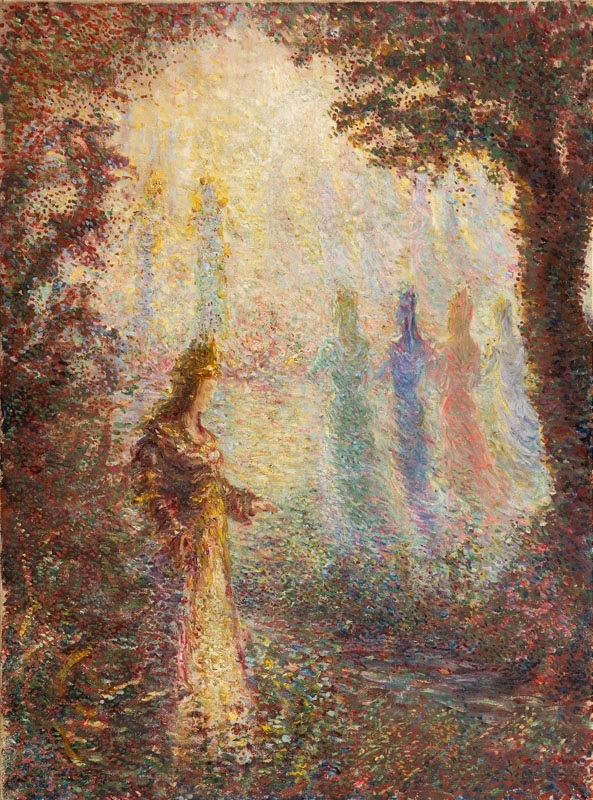
Rusalki, a type of minor goddesses, represented by Franciszek Siedlecki.

In Slavic paganism there are a variety of female tutelary spirits associated with water. They have been compared to the Greek Nymphs, and they may be either white (beneficent) or black (maleficent). They may be called Navki, Rusalki, and Vily.

The Proto-Slavic root *navь-, which forms one of the names for these beings, means "dead", as these minor goddesses are conceived as the spirits of dead children or young women. They are represented as half-naked beautiful girls with long hair, but in the South Slavic tradition also as birds who soar in the depths of the skies. They live in waters, woods and steppes, and they giggle, sing, play music and clap their hands. They are so beautiful that they bewitch young men and might bring them to death by drawing them into deep water.

== Etymology ==
Navia, spelled in various ways in the Slavic languages, refers to the souls of the dead. Navka and Mavka (pl. Navki and Mavki) are variations with the diminutive suffix -ka. They are also known as Lalka (pl. Lalki). The Proto-Slavic root *navь-, means "dead", "deceased" or "corpse". The word Nav is also the name of the underworld, Vyraj, which is presided by the chthonic god Veles.

The world of the dead is believed to be separated from the world of the living either by a sea or a river located deep underground. In the folk beliefs of Ruthenia, Veles lives in a swamp located at the centre of Nav, sitting on a golden throne at the base of the world tree, and wielding a sword. Symbolically, the Nav is also described as a huge green plain–pasture, onto which Veles guides the souls. The entrance to Nav is guarded by a zmey, a dragon.

According to Stanisław Urbańczyk, amongst other scholars, Navia was a general name for demons arising from the souls of tragic and premature deaths, the killers and the killed, warlocks, and the drowned. They were said to be hostile and unfavourable towards the living, being jealous of life. In Bulgarian folklore there exists the character of twelve Navias who suck the blood out of women giving birth, whereas in the Primary Chronicle the Navias are presented as a demonic personification of the 1092 plague in Polotsk. According to folk beliefs, Navias may take the form of birds.

== Types of water goddesses ==
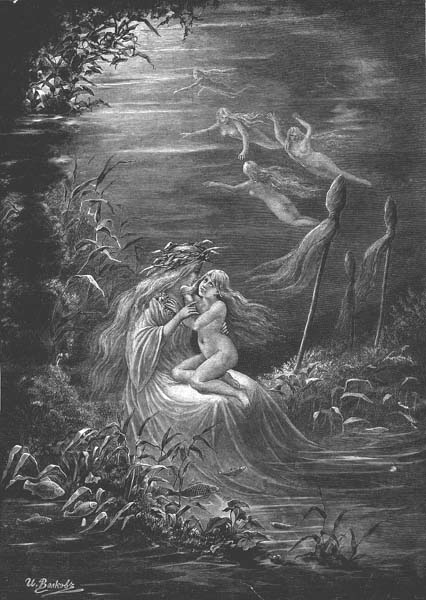
A Rusalka and her daughter, by I. Volkov, 1899.

=== Rusalka ===
According to Vladimir Propp, Rusalka (pl. Rusalki) was an appellation used by the early Slavs for tutelary deities of water who favour fertility, and they were not considered evil entities before the nineteenth century. They came out of the water in spring to transfer life-giving moisture to the fields, thus nurturing the crops.

In nineteenth-century descriptions, however, the Rusalka became an unquiet, dangerous, unclean spirit (Nav). According to Dmitry Zelenin, young women, who either committed suicide by drowning due to an unhappy marriage (they might have been jilted by their lovers or abused and harassed by their much older husbands) or who were violently drowned against their will (especially after becoming pregnant with unwanted children), must live out their designated time on earth as Rusalkas. Original Slavic lore suggests that not all Rusalkas were linked with death from water.

They appear in the form of beautiful girls, with long hair, generally naked but covered with their long tresses, with wreaths of sedge on their heads. They live in groups in crystal palaces at the bottom of rivers, emerging only in springtime; others live in fields and forests. In springtime, they dance and sing along the riverbanks promoting the growth of rye. After the first thunder, they return to their rivers or rise to the skies.

According to Polish folklore, they appeared on new moon and lured young men to play with them, killing them with tickles or frenzied dancing. Sometimes they would ask a riddle, and, if given the right answer, they would leave the man alone. They were particularly mean towards young girls. In some regions they were called majka (pl. majki); in the Tatra Mountains – dziwożona. Other names used to describe this spirit were: water maiden, moriana and wodiana (the last one became topielica later). A rusalka wasn't necessarily a water spirit – forest ones existed too, and they appeared as more mature than their water counterparts (they also had black hair instead of golden).

They were worshipped together with ancestors during the Rosalia (or Rusalye) festival in spring, originally a Roman festival for offering roses (and other flowers) to gods and ancestors; from the festival derives the term rusalka itself. Another time associated with the Rusalkas is the green week (or Rusalnaya nedelja, "week of the Rusalkas") in early June; a common feature of this celebration was the ritual banishment or burial of the Rusalka at the end of the week, which remained popular in Russia, Belarus, and Ukraine until the 1930s.

=== Vila ===
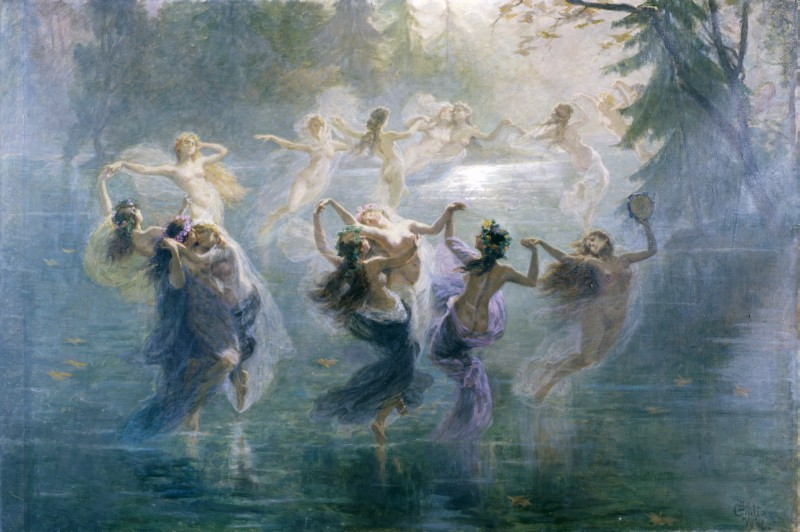
Vilas (Le Villi, 1906) as represented by Bartolomeo Giuliano.

Vila (pl. Vily) are another type of minor goddesses, already identified as Nymphs by the Greek historian Procopius; their name comes from the same root as the name of Veles. They are described as beautiful, eternally young, dressed in white, with eyes flashing like thunders, and provided with wings. They live in the clouds, in mountain woods or in the waters. They are well-disposed towards men, and they are able to turn themselves into horses, wolves, snakes, falcons and swans. The cult of the Vilas was still practised among South Slavs in the early twentieth century, with offerings of fruits and flowers in caves, cakes near wells, and ribbons hanged to the branches of trees.

== Variations ==
- Rusałka (Polish);
- Navi, Navjaci (Bulgarian);
- Navje, Mavje (Slovenian);
- Nejka, Majka, Mavka (Ukrainian);
- Nemodlika (Bohemian, Moravian);
- Russalka (Russian, Ukrainian, Belarusian);
- Vila, Wila;
- Samovila, Samodiva (Bulgarian);

== See also ==
- Vyraj

== Gallery of household deities ==
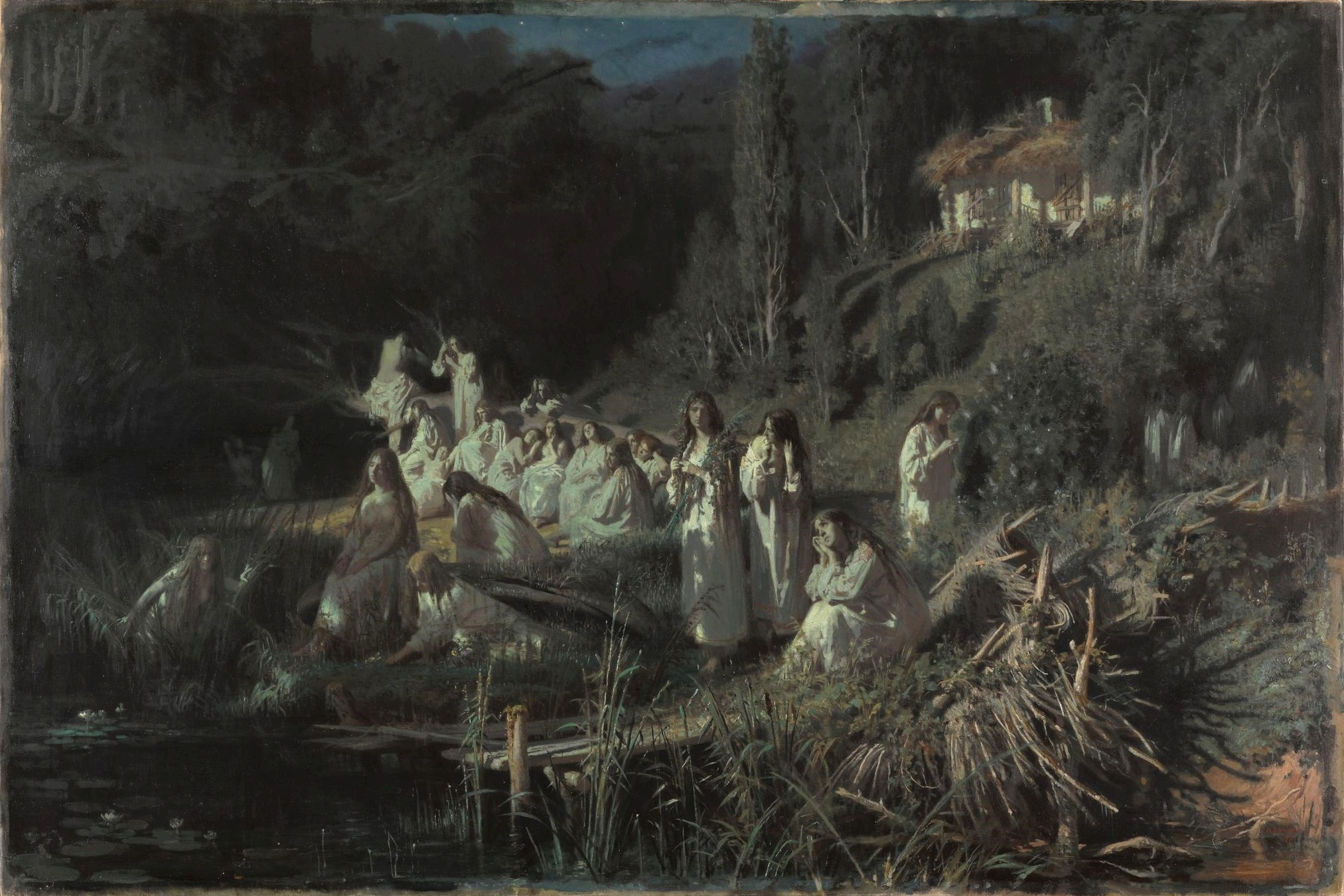
The Mermaids, 1871, by Ivan Kramskoi

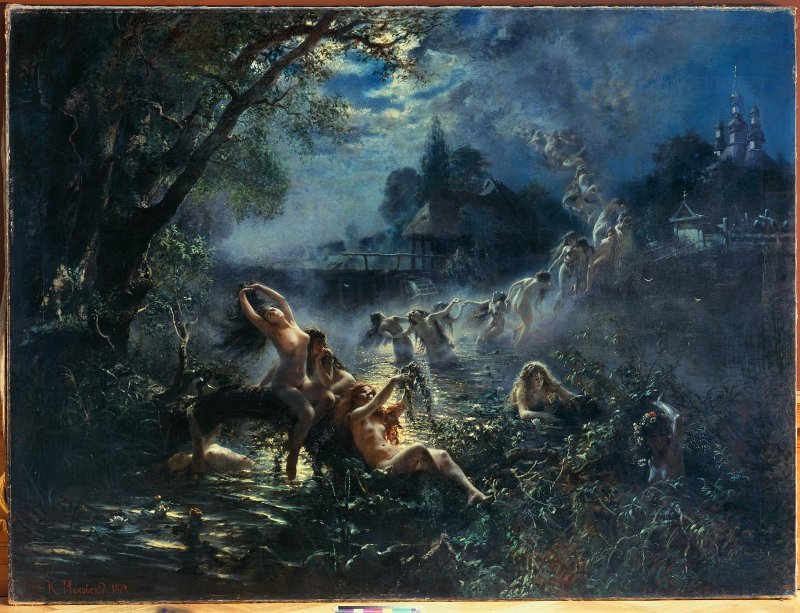
Rusalky, 1879, by Konstantin Makovsky

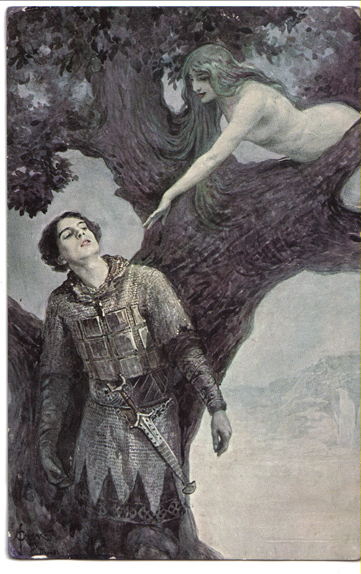
Rusalka, 1928, by Sergey Solomko

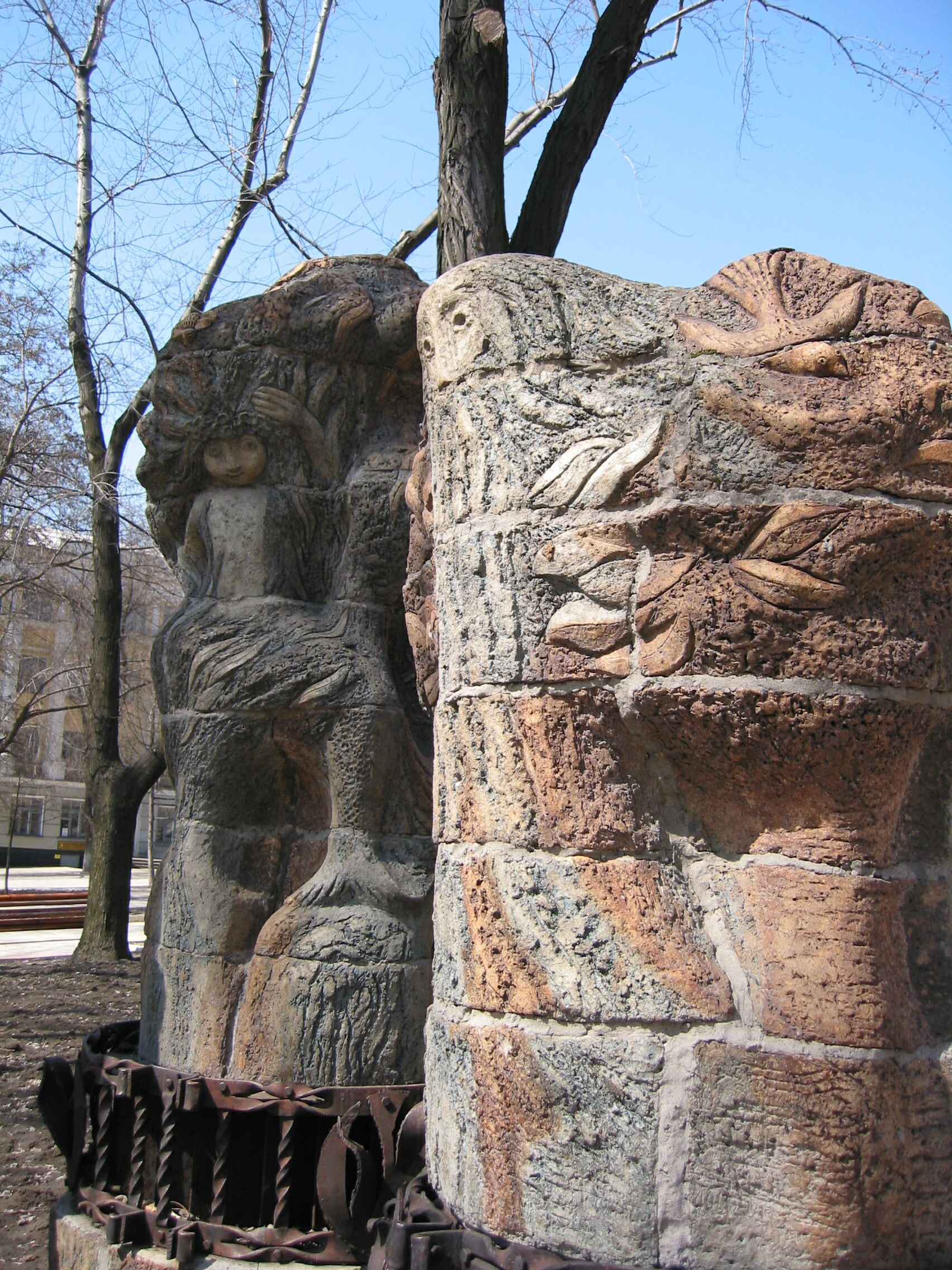
Stone representation of spirits in Donetsk
