= Bibel =

Bibel is a surname. Notable people with the surname include:

- Leon Bibel (1913–1995), American painter and printmaker
- Wolfgang Bibel (born 1938), German computer scientist and mathematician

== See also ==
- Bible (disambiguation)
