= Dziwożona =

Swamp demon in Slavic mythology

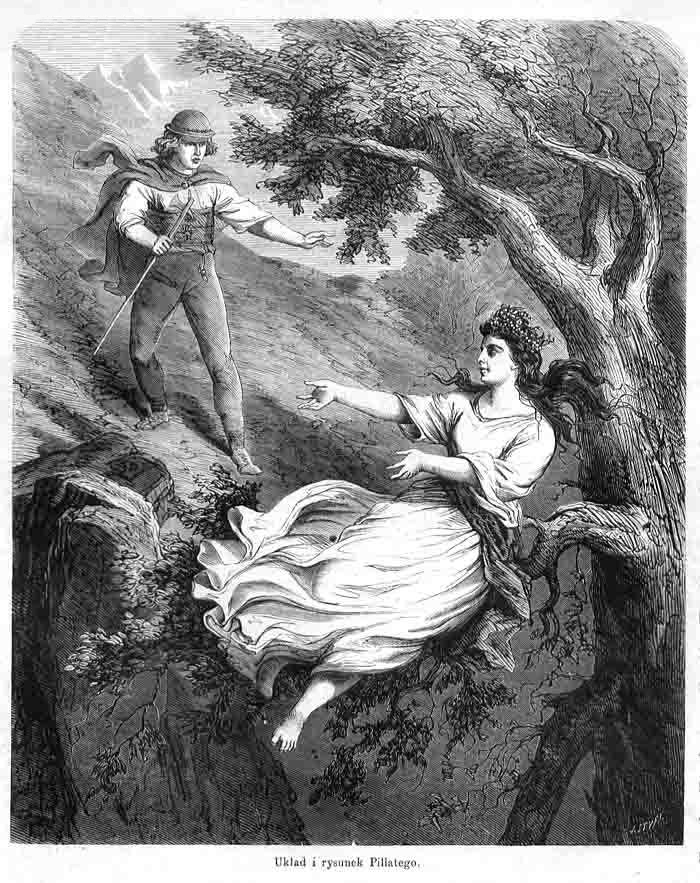
Dziwożona. Woodcut by Jan Styfi (1839-1921) based on an earlier engraving by Henryk Pillati. Published in Tygodnik Ilustrowany magazine on October 22, 1864

Dziwożona (or Mamuna or Boginka) is a female swamp demon in Slavic mythology known for being malicious and dangerous. Most at risk of becoming one of these demons after death were thought to be midwives, old maids, unmarried mothers, pregnant women who die before childbirth, as well as abandoned children born out of wedlock.

== Etymology ==
From dziwo (God, sacred, wonder, see Deus) + żona (female, see gyne). In Slovak she was called „diva lena”/ „divá žena”, in Czech „divoženka”, which means "wild woman". In modern Polish the literal meaning is strangewife. This is also where the Polish "dziwożona" came from; the term was popularized by the writer Zygmunt Kaczkowski in his book written in 1855 under the same name. Other names include the Hutsul dykaja żena or the Sorb wódna żona. The term Dziwożona is exclusive to mountain regions; in different places, a similar spirit was called mamuna or boginka, and later all three became rusalka.

== Behaviour ==
Dziwożona was said to live in thickets near rivers, streams and lakes. According to some, she took the form of an ugly, old woman with a hairy body, long straight hair and breasts so huge that she used them to wash her clothes. On her head she wore a red hat with a fern twig attached to it.

Dziwożona was said to kidnap human babies just after they were born and replace them with her own children, known as foundlings or changelings. A changeling could be recognized by its uncommon appearance – disproportionate body, often with some kind of disability – as well as its wickedness. It had a huge abdomen, unusually small or large head, a hump, thin arms and legs, a hairy body and long claws; it also prematurely cut its first teeth. Its behaviour was said to be marked by a great spitefulness towards people around it, a fear of its mother, noisiness, reluctance to sleep and exceptional gluttony. As an adult (which was in fact rare, as nearly all changelings were thought to die in early childhood), it was disabled, gibbered instead of talked, and mistrusted people.

To protect a child against being kidnapped by Dziwożona, a mother had to tie a red ribbon around its hand (this custom is still preserved in some regions of Poland, although without the original meaning), put a red hat on its head and shield its face from the light of the moon. Under no circumstances should she wash its nappies after sunset nor turn her head away from the child when it was asleep. Another method of deterring a Dziwożona was to keep a St. John's wort flower at home or to grab it when the danger was direct. This practice is also described in sources describing boginki.

However, even if Dziwożona managed to take a baby away, there was still a way to get it back. The mother had to take the changeling to a midden, whip it with a birch twig and pour water over it from an eggshell, shouting "Take yours, give mine back!", at which point Dziwożona normally felt sorry for her offspring and took it away, returning the one she stole.
