= Rodau (Main) =

River in Hesse, Germany

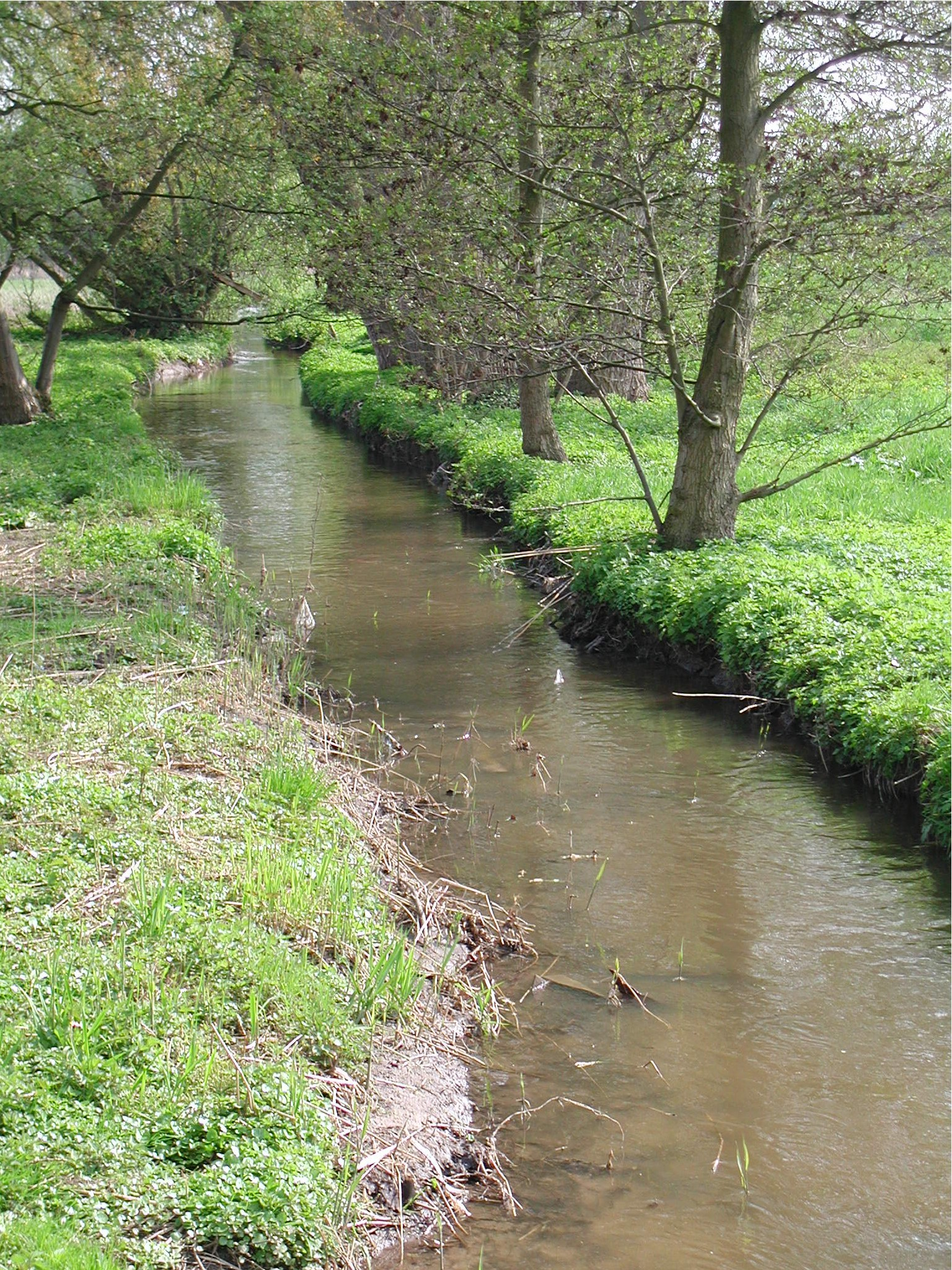

Location
- Country: Germany
- State: Hesse

Physical characteristics
- Mouth
  - location: Mühlheim am Main
  - coordinates: 50.1312°N 8.8271°E
- Length: 27.5 km (17.1 mi)

Basin features
- Progression: Main→ Rhine→ North Sea

Rodau is a river of Hesse, Germany. It is a left tributary of the Main in Mühlheim am Main.

== See also ==
- List of rivers of Hesse
