= Central District (Bileh Savar County) =

District in Ardabil province, Iran

Central District (Bileh Savar County) Persian: بخش مرکزی شهرستان بیله‌ سوار
- District
- Location within Iran
- Coordinates: 39°19′N 48°06′E
- Country: Iran
- Province: Ardabil
- County: Bileh Savar
- Established: 1991

Population (2016)
  - Total: 29,111
- Time zone: UTC+3:30 (IRST)

The Central District of Bileh Savar County (Persian: بخش مرکزی شهرستان بیله‌ سوار) is in Ardabil province, Iran. Its capital is the city of Bileh Savar.

== Demographics ==
=== Population ===
At the time of the 2006 National Census, the district's population was 29,786 in 6,438 households. The following census in 2011 counted 30,920 people in 8,082 households. The 2016 census measured the population of the district as 29,111 inhabitants living in 8,722 households.

=== Administrative divisions ===
Central District (Bileh Savar County) Population
Administrative Divisions	2006	2011	2016
Anjirlu RD	4,368	4,049	2,951
Gug Tappeh RD	11,391	11,688	9,972
Bileh Savar (city)	14,027	15,183	16,188
Total	29,786	30,920	29,111
RD = Rural District
