= Lea Salonga on screen and stage =

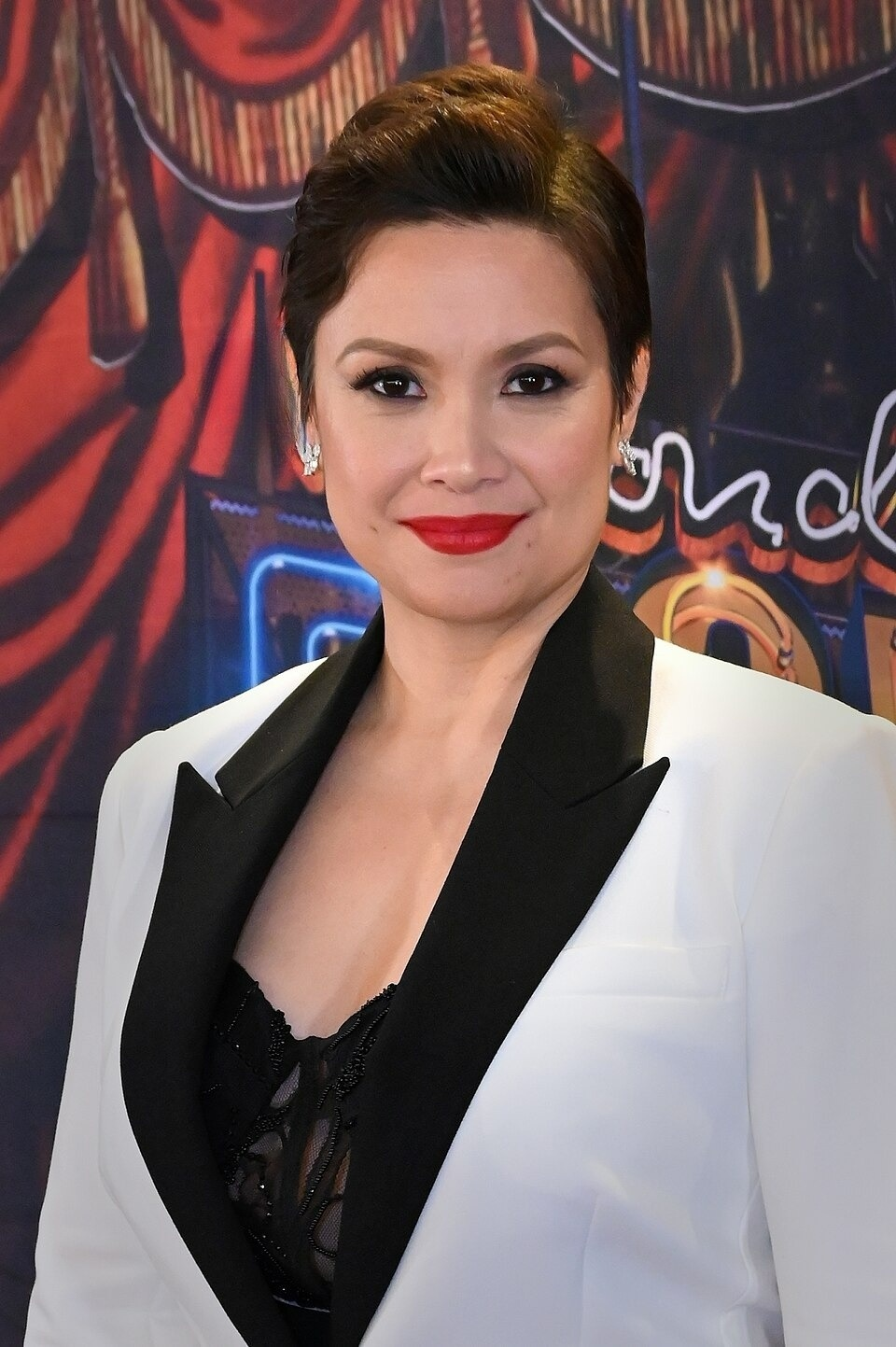
Salonga in 2025

Filipino actress Lea Salonga has appeared in international theatre productions, television shows, films, and video games. She made her professional debut on stage in the 1978 Repertory Philippines production of The King and I. She went on to appear and star in productions such as Cat on a Hot Tin Roof (1978), Fiddler on the Roof (1978), Annie (1980), The Sound of Music (1980), The Rose Tattoo (1980), and The Bad Seed (1981) in Manila. In 1981, Salonga made her film debut as Lisa in the Filipino comedy Tropang Bulilit. Salonga continued performing in theatre productions in Manila, including The Goodbye Girl (1982), The Paper Moon (1983), a revival of Annie (1984), and The Fantasticks (1988). From 1983 to 1985, Salonga hosted her own television variety show entitled Love, Lea. In 1986, she also appeared as a Thursday group member on the television series That's Entertainment. Throughout the 1980s, she also appeared in the Filipino films Like Father, Like Son (1985), Ninja Kids (1986), Captain Barbell (1986), Pik Pak Boom (1988), and Dear Diary (1989).

Salonga rose to international recognition in 1989 after starring as Kim in the original West End production of Miss Saigon, a role she later reprised when the musical transferred to Broadway in 1991. A documentary entitled The Heat Is On, which details the creation and casting process of the original production, was filmed and released in 1989. In 1991, she appeared as Kim during the 65th Macy's Thanksgiving Day Parade. In 1992, Salonga finished her run in Miss Saigon to provide the singing voice for Princess Jasmine in Disney's Aladdin. In the same year, she returned to the Philippines to star as Sandy in the romantic drama film Bakit Labis Kitang Mahal. In 1993, Salonga returned to the Broadway stage as Éponine in Les Misérables. In the same year, she appeared as a guest star in Olsen Twins Mother's Day Special and Sesame Street and as a narrator in Reading Rainbow. In 1994, Salonga returned again to the Philippines to star as Eliza Doolittle in My Fair Lady before portraying The Witch in the Singapore production Into the Woods. In 1995, Salonga starred as Agnes in the Filipino film Sana Maulit Muli and Geri Riorden in the television film Redwood Curtain. Salonga also starred as Sandy Dombrowski in the Manila production of Grease before reprising the role of Éponine in the 10th anniversary concert of Les Misérables, which was filmed and later released in 1998. In 1996, Salonga once again reprised the role of Éponine in the West End production and third U.S. national tour of Les Misérables in Honolulu. In 1997, she began appearing as a guest performer and co-host in the Filipino variety show ASAP. In 1998, Salonga provided the singing voice for Mulan in Disney's Mulan. In 1999, Salonga starred as Sonia Walsk in the Singapore production of They're Playing Our Song, later reprising the role in the 2000 Manila production. In the same year, she also returned to the West End production of Miss Saigon as Kim to close the show as well as the Broadway production. In 2000, Salonga again reprised the same role in the original Manila production of Miss Saigon before returning once more to Broadway to close that production in 2001.

In 2001, Salonga appeared as Lien Hughes in the American soap opera As the World Turns, a role she later reprised in 2003. She also made a guest appearance as Amparo in the medical drama series ER. Also in 2001, Salonga began portraying Mei-Li in the Los Angeles production of Flower Drum Song. In 2002, Salonga returned to the Philippines to star as Catherine in the Manila production of Proof before reprising the role of Mei-Li in the Broadway revival of Flower Drum Song. While performing in this production, she also appeared as a guest performer in Something Good: A Broadway Salute to Richard Rogers on His 100th Birthday, which was filmed and televised. In 2004, Salonga starred as Lizzie Fields in the Manila production of Baby. She also provided the English voice of Yasuko Kusakabe in Disney's dub of My Neighbor Totoro, reprised the role of the singing voice of Mulan in Mulan II, and made a guest appearance on the animated series Johnny Bravo in the same year. In 2007, Salonga returned to Broadway to perform the role of Fantine in the revival of Les Misérables and reprised the role of the singing voice of Princess Jasmine in the film Disney Princess Enchanted Tales: Follow Your Dreams. In 2008, she portrayed the title role in the Asian tour of Rodgers and Hammerstein's Cinderella.

In 2010, Salonga starred as Grizabella in the Manila production of Cats before reprising the role of Fantine at the 25th anniversary concert of Les Misérables, which was filmed and later released. In 2011, Salonga appeared as a judge for Miss Universe 2011 in São Paulo, Brazil, which was televised worldwide. In 2012, she portrayed Veronica in the Manila production of God of Carnage before starring as Kei Kimura in the original San Diego production of Allegiance. She also again reprised the role of the singing voice of Princess Jasmine in the American animated series Sofia the First. In 2013, she starred as Mother in a concert production of Ragtime, held in New York City. From 2013 to 2015, Salonga became appeared as one of the coaches on the reality television singing competition The Voice of the Philippines. In 2014, she also began appearing as a coach on The Voice Kids, returned to Sofia the First to reprise the role of the singing voice of Mulan, and performed at the 25th anniversary gala performance of Miss Saigon, which was filmed and later released in 2016. In 2015, Salonga returned to Broadway to reprise the role of Kei Kimura in the original Broadway production of Allegiance, which was filmed and released in theaters in 2016. In 2016, Salonga starred as Helen Bechdel in the Manila production of Fun Home, made a guest appearance on Crazy Ex-Girlfriend as Aunt Myrna, and provided the voice of Mother Nature in Nature Is Speaking. In 2017, she began appearing as a coach on The Voice Teens before portraying Erzulie in the Broadway revival of Once on This Island and performing the role during the 91st Macy's Thanksgiving Day Parade. In 2018, she portrayed Grace Farrell in the Hollywood Bowl production of Annie and narrated the film Expedition Reef before returning to the role of Erzulie to close the Broadway revival production of Once on This Island in 2019. In 2019, Salonga starred as Mrs. Lovett in the Manila and Singapore productions of Sweeney Todd: The Demon Barber of Fleet Street. In the same year, she appeared as Gail Garcia in the American film Yellow Rose.

In 2020, she returned as a coach on The Voice Teens. Later in the year, on November 27, her 2019 concert with the Sydney Symphony Orchestra was broadcast on PBS as part of the series Great Performances. In 2021, she voiced Mysterious Woman in the animated Netflix series Centaurworld. In 2022, she narrated an episode of the series American Experience before appearing in the recurring role of Elodie Honrada in the HBO Max drama series Pretty Little Liars: Original Sin. She reprised this role in Pretty Little Liars: Summer School, which was released in May 2024. In the same year, she also provided the voices of Amalia and Dia in the adult animated sitcom series Little Demon. On April 2, 2023, Salonga presented at the 2023 Laurence Olivier Awards. On May 25 of the same year, she was featured on the TAAF AAPI Heritage Heroes 2023 documentary special in the short film Who I Am Inside. In July 2023, Salonga performed as Aurora Aquino in the original Broadway production of Here Lies Love. In September 2023, she began starring with Bernadette Peters in the Stephen Sondheim West End tribute revue, Stephen Sondheim's Old Friends. In December 2023, her 2022 Christmas concerts with the Tabernacle Choir were broadcast on PBS. In 2024, she was featured in the animated children series Firebuds. In October 2024, Salonga starred in a Filipino production of the Franz Xaver Kroetz solo play Wunschkonzert (or Request Program), retitled Request sa Radyo, at the Samsung Performing Arts Center in Manila. She alternated the lead role of Ms. Reyes with Filipino actress Dolly de Leon. In November 2024, she performed on the Sesame Street float during the televised 98th Macy's Thanksgiving Day Parade. In January 2025, Salonga made a guest appearance on an episode of Finding Your Roots. That same year, Salonga and Bernadette Peters began reprising their performances in the Broadway production of Stephen Sondheim's Old Friends at the Samuel J. Friedman Theatre, following a pre-Broadway run at the Ahmanson Theatre in Los Angeles.

== Theatre ==
Year(s)	Title	Role	Venue	Notes	Ref(s)
1978	The King and I	Ensemble	Cultural Center of the Philippines Complex, Pasay	Professional debut	
1978	Cat on a Hot Tin Roof	Ensemble		Manila	
1978	Fiddler on the Roof	Ensemble	Cultural Center of the Philippines Complex, Pasay		
1980	Annie	Annie		Original Manila production	
1980	The Sound of Music	Brigitta		Manila	
1980	The Rose Tattoo	Unknown		Manila	
1981	The Bad Seed	Rhoda		Manila	
1982	The Goodbye Girl	Lucy		Manila	
1983	The Paper Moon	Addie		Manila	
1984	Annie	Annie		Manila revival	
1988	The Fantasticks	Luisa		Manila	
1989–1990, 1999	Miss Saigon	Kim	Theatre Royal, Drury Lane, West End	Original West End production	
1991–1992, 1999, 2001	Miss Saigon	Kim	Broadway Theatre, Broadway	Original Broadway production	
1993	Les Misérables	Éponine	Imperial Theatre, Broadway	Replacement	
1994	My Fair Lady	Eliza Doolittle	Meralco Theater, Pasig		
1994	Into the Woods	Witch	Victoria Theatre, Singapore		
1995	Grease	Sandy Dombrowski	Meralco Theater, Pasig	Manila	
1995	Les Misérables: The 10th Anniversary Concert	Éponine	Royal Albert Hall, London	Concert production	
1996	Les Misérables	Éponine	Palace Theatre, West End	Replacement	
1996	Les Misérables	Éponine	Neal S. Blaisdell Center Concert Hall, Honolulu	U.S. national tour	
1999	They're Playing Our Song	Sonia Walsk	Jubilee Hall, Singapore		
2000	They're Playing Our Song	Sonia Walsk	AFP Theater, Quezon City		
2000	Miss Saigon	Kim	Cultural Center of the Philippines Complex, Pasay	Original Manila production	
2001–2002	Flower Drum Song	Mei-Li	Mark Taper Forum, Los Angeles		
2002	Proof	Catherine	GSIS Theater, Pasay		
2002–2003	Flower Drum Song	Mei-Li	Virginia Theatre, Broadway	Broadway revival	
2002	Something Good: A Broadway Salute to Richard Rogers on His 100th Birthday	Performer	Gershwin Theatre, Broadway		
2004	Baby	Lizzie Fields	Meralco Theater, Pasig		
2007	Les Misérables	Fantine	Broadhurst Theatre, Broadway	Replacement	
2008	Cinderella	Cinderella		Asian tour	
2010	Cats	Grizabella	Nicanor Abelardo Theatre, Manila		
2010	Les Misérables in Concert: The 25th Anniversary	Fantine	The O2 Arena, London	Concert production	
2012	God of Carnage	Veronica	Carlos P. Romulo Auditorium, Makati		
2012	God of Carnage	Veronica	DBS Arts Centre, Singapore		
2012	Allegiance	Kei Kimura	Old Globe Theatre, San Diego	Original San Diego production	
2013	Ragtime	Mother	Avery Fisher Hall, New York City	Concert production	
2015–2016	Allegiance	Kei Kimura	Longacre Theatre, Broadway	Original Broadway production	
2016	Fun Home	Helen Bechdel	Carlos P. Romulo Auditorium, Makati		
2017–2018, 2018–2019	Once on This Island	Erzulie	Circle in the Square Theatre, Broadway	Broadway revival	
2018	Annie	Grace Farrell	Hollywood Bowl, Los Angeles		
2019	Sweeney Todd: The Demon Barber of Fleet Street	Mrs. Lovett	The Theatre at Solaire, Parañaque		
2019	Sweeney Todd: The Demon Barber of Fleet Street	Mrs. Lovett	Sands Theatre, Singapore		
2023	Here Lies Love	Aurora Aquino / Producer	Broadway Theatre, Broadway	Original Broadway production; producing debut	
2023–2024	Stephen Sondheim’s Old Friends	Herself / Various	Gielgud Theatre, West End	Original West End production	
2024	Request sa Radyo	Ms. Reyes	Samsung Performing Arts Center, Makati	Manila	
2025	Stephen Sondheim’s Old Friends	Herself / Various	Ahmanson Theatre, Los Angeles	North American premiere	
2025	Stephen Sondheim’s Old Friends	Herself / Various	Samuel J. Friedman Theatre, Broadway	Original Broadway production	
2025	Into the Woods	Witch	Samsung Performing Arts Center, Makati	Manila	
2026	Les Misérables	Madame Thenardier	World Tour Spectacular		

== Film ==
Year	Title	Role	Notes	Ref(s)
1981	Tropang Bulilit	Lisa	Film debut	
1985	Like Father, Like Son	Angela		
1986	Ninja Kids	Yoko		
1986	Captain Barbell	Rosemarie		
1988	Pik Pak Boom	Rosie	"Manyika" segment	
1989	Dear Diary	Lenny Tacorda	"Dear Killer" segment	
1989	The Heat Is On	Herself / Kim	Documentary	
1992	Aladdin	Princess Jasmine (singing voice)	Voice	
1992	Bakit Labis Kitang Mahal	Sandy		
1995	Sana Maulit Muli	Agnes		
1998	Mulan	Mulan (singing voice)	Voice	
1998	Les Misérables: The Dream Cast in Concert	Éponine	Live concert recording	
2004	My Neighbor Totoro	Yasuko Kusakabe	English dub (Disney version)	
2004	Mulan II	Mulan (singing voice)	Direct-to-video	
2005	Disney Princess: A Christmas of Enchantment	Princess Jasmine (singing voice)	Direct-to-video	
2007	Disney Princess Enchanted Tales: Follow Your Dreams	Princess Jasmine (singing voice)	Direct-to-video	
2010	Les Misérables in Concert: The 25th Anniversary	Fantine	Live concert	
2016	Miss Saigon: 25th Anniversary	Herself / Kim	Live recording of stage performance	
2016	Allegiance	Kei Kimura	Live recording of stage performance	
2018	Expedition Reef	Narrator	Voice	
2019	Yellow Rose	Gail Garcia		
2023	Once Upon a Studio	Mulan	Voice	
2025	KPop Demon Hunters	Celine (singing voice)	Netflix original movie	
2026	Forgotten Island	Manang	Voice	
TBA	The Vale: Origins †	Addy Lee	Short film	

Key
†	Denotes films that have not yet been released

== Television ==
Year(s)	Title	Role	Notes	Network(s)	Ref(s)
1983–1985	Love, Lea	Herself	Variety show		
1986	That's Entertainment	Herself	Thursday group member	GMA Network	
1987	Vilma	Herself	Performer	GMA Network	
1987	John en Marsha	Lea	Volume 12, Episode 1	Radio Philippines Network	
1991	45th Annual Tony Awards	Herself / Kim	Performer, Winner	CBS	
1991	65th Macy's Thanksgiving Day Parade	Kim	Performer	NBC	
1993	Olsen Twins Mother's Day Special	Herself	Television film		
1993	Geraldo	Herself	Guest, performer	Syndicated	
1993	Sesame Street	Herself	Episode 3154	PBS	
1993, 2001	Reading Rainbow	Narrator	Voice; 2 episodes: "Silent Lotus" and "My America: A Poetry Atlas of the United States"	PBS	
1995	Redwood Curtain	Geri Riorden	Television film	American Broadcasting Company	
1995	Aladdin on Ice	Princess Jasmine (singing voice)	Voice (uncredited); television film of live ice-skating performance		
1997–present	ASAP	Herself	Guest performer and co-host	ABS-CBN	
2001, 2003	As the World Turns	Lien Hughes #2	Recurring role	CBS	
2001	ER	Amparo	Season 8, Episode 10: "I'll Be Home for Christmas"	NBC	
2002	56th Annual Tony Awards	Herself	Performer	CBS	
2004	Johnny Bravo	Cheerleader #1 / Princess / Princess #1	Voice; 2 episodes	Cartoon Network	
2005	Harmony in Faith	Narrator	Documentary	Hallmark Channel	
2010	The Wendy Williams Show	Herself	Guest performer	Syndication	
2011	Miss Universe 2011	Herself	Judge	NBC	
2013	Sofia the First	Princess Jasmine (singing voice)	Voice; 1 episode	Disney Channel	
2013	Gandang Gabi, Vice!	Herself	1 episode	ABS-CBN	
2013, 2014–15	The Voice of the Philippines	Herself	Coach (2 seasons)	ABS-CBN	
2014	Sofia the First	Mulan (singing voice)	Voice; 1 episode	Disney Channel	
2014–2019	The Voice Kids	Herself	Coach (4 seasons)	ABS-CBN	
2016	Crazy Ex-Girlfriend	Aunt Myrna	1 episode	The CW	
2016	Nature Is Speaking	Mother Nature	Voice; Episode: "Inang Kalikasan"		
2017	71st Annual Tony Awards	Herself	Presenter	CBS	
2017	91st Macy's Thanksgiving Day Parade	Erzulie	Performer	NBC	
2017, 2020	The Voice Teens	Herself	Coach (2 seasons)	ABS-CBN	
2018	72nd Annual Tony Awards	Herself / Erzulie	Performer	CBS	
2020	Great Performances	Herself	Season 48, Episode 9: "Lea Salonga in Concert"	CBS	
2021	Centaurworld	Mysterious Woman	Voice; 6 episodes	Netflix	
2021	United in Song: Celebrating the American Dream	Herself	Performer; television special		
2022	Great Performances	Herself	Season 49, Episode 16: "Reopening: The Broadway Revival"	PBS	
2022	American Experience	Narrator	Voice; Season 34, Episode 7: "Plague at the Golden Gate"	PBS	
2022	National Memorial Day Concert	Herself	Performer	PBS	
2022	Pretty Little Liars: Original Sin	Elodie Honrada	Main role; 8 episodes	Max	
2022	Little Demon	Amalia / Dia	Voice; 2 episodes	FXX	
2023	2023 Laurence Olivier Awards	Herself	Presenter	ITV	
2023	TAAF AAPI Heritage Heroes 2023	Herself	"Who I Am Inside"; documentary special short film	Hulu	
2023	Christmas with The Tabernacle Choir at Temple Square	Herself	Performer	PBS	
2024	Firebuds	Yolanda Yamada	Voice; 1 episode: "Balancing Act/Monster Truck Piston"	Disney Junior	
2024	Pretty Little Liars: Summer School	Elodie Honrada	Recurring role	Max	
2024	98th Macy's Thanksgiving Day Parade	Herself	Performer	NBC	
2025	Finding Your Roots	Herself	Guest; Season 11, Episode 1: "Largar Than Life"	PBS	
2025	The Cleaning Lady	Rose	Guest; Season 4, Episode 2: "Le Medecin"	Fox	

== Video games ==
Year	Title	Role	Notes	Ref(s)
1994	Disney’s Activity Center: Aladdin	Princess Jasmine (singing voice)	Voice; Windows and Mac	
1998	Disney's Animated Storybook: Mulan	Mulan (singing voice)	Voice; Windows, Mac, PlayStation	
2001	Disney's Aladdin in Nasira's Revenge	Princess Jasmine (singing voice)	Voice; PlayStation and Windows	
2010	Disney Sing It: Family Hits	Princess Jasmine (singing voice)	Voice; PlayStation 3 and Wii	

== See also ==
- List of awards and nominations received by Lea Salonga
