= Ben Richter =

American composer (born 1986)

- Ben Richter performing in Lowell, MA, 2025

Background information
- Born: 1986 (age 39–40)
- Origin: United States
- Genres: experimental; contemporary classical; minimalism; microtonal; ambient; drone
- Occupations: composer, performer
- Instrument: accordion
- Labels: New World Records, Infrequent Seams, Indexical
- Member of: Ghost Ensemble
- Website: https://www.benrichtermusic.com

Ben Richter (born 1986) is an American composer, accordionist, and director of Ghost Ensemble, an experimental chamber ensemble based in New York.

== Biography ==
Ben Richter was born in the United States in 1986. Specializing in microtonal accordion performance, he composes chamber music that explores subtle gestures, the interactions of gradual processes, modes of awareness, and Deep Listening. He has collaborated with Pauline Oliveros, Phill Niblock, Carmina Escobar, SEM Ensemble, Nieuw Ensemble, and The Dresden Dolls, among others. He teaches at CalArts and holds an M.M. in music from the Royal Conservatory of The Hague (2012) and a B.A. from Bard College (2008), where he studied with Kyle Gann, Joan Tower, and George Tsontakis and privately with Pauline Oliveros. In 2012, he founded Ghost Ensemble, which frequently performs his music and that of other living composers.

== Selected compositions ==
Richter's works include:

- Healing Ghost/Destroying Angel (2013), a 60-minute diptych chamber work for Ghost Ensemble.
- Farther Reaches (2013), a slowly building orchestra work exploring timbral shifts and constant portamento movement.
- Rivulose (2015), piano concerto featured at Ostrava Days 2015 and on Czech Radio.
- Wind People (2016), an acoustic chamber work for Ghost Ensemble combining elements of ambient drone, doom metal, and classical music.
- Panthalassa: Dream Music of the Once and Future Ocean (2017), a 46-minute immersive work for just intonation accordion.
- Tides of the Wolf (2019), an opera collaboration with novelist Edie Meidav and vocalist Carmina Escobar.
- Rewild (2022), a 50-minute ecological work for Ghost Ensemble.

== Discography ==
=== as Ben Richter ===
- Aurogeny - CD (Infrequent Seams, December 2023)
- Panthalassa: Dream Music of the Once and Future Ocean - CD (Infrequent Seams, June 2017)

=== with Ghost Ensemble ===
- Rewild - CD (New World Records, October 2024), including Richter's Rewild
- Mountain Air - CD (Indexical, September 2021)
- We Who Walk Again - LP (Indexical, May 2018), including Richter's Wind People
- Lightbulb Ensemble & Ghost Ensemble Live at Pioneer Works (Indexical, 2015), including Richter's Healing Ghost

=== with The Dresden Dolls ===
- The Dresden Dolls: In Paradise - DVD (Roadrunner Records, 2005)
