= Ghost Ensemble =

American musical group

- Origin: New York, NY
- Genres: experimental; contemporary classical; minimalism; microtonal; ambient; drone
- Years active: 2012–present
- Label: Indexical
- Members: Ben Richter; Sky Macklay; James Ilgenfritz; Margaret Lancaster; Chris Nappi; Lucia Stavros; Martine Thomas; Tyler J. Borden; Kyle Motl; Carl Bettendorf
- Website: http://www.ghostensemble.org

Ghost Ensemble is a New York-based experimental new music ensemble composed of flute, oboe, accordion, percussion, harp, viola, cello, two contrabasses, and a conductor. The ensemble frequently commissions new works that merge classically notated music and improvisation with experimental sound practices. They follow an aesthetic that has been described as "music composed for a deep listening that fixes you in the present," that "uses sound to seek an altered consciousness, from a meditative awareness to a look, perhaps, into a different dimension".

The ensemble is closely connected to the music of Pauline Oliveros, who introduced several members of the ensemble before its inception. The group frequently performs the work of Oliveros and advocates for her philosophy of Deep Listening. Ghost Ensemble's 2018 debut LP features work by Oliveros, ensemble director Ben Richter, and founding oboist Sky Macklay. The 2021 release Mountain Air features the Oliveros work of the same name and works by Marguerite Brown and Teodora Stepancic. Other composers commissioned by the ensemble include Catherine Lamb, Miya Masaoka, Sarah Davachi, ensemble bassist James Ilgenfritz, Elizabeth Adams, Kristina Wolfe, Andrew C. Smith, and Kyle Gann. Performance collaborators have included Carmina Escobar and David Rothenberg. Ghost Ensemble has performed nationally at venues such as REDCAT in Los Angeles and Pioneer Works in New York.

== Discography ==
- interius/exterius - LP (greyfade, May 2025), with Catherine Lamb
- Rewild - CD (New World Records, October 2024), with Ben Richter
- Mountain Air - CD (Indexical, September 2021), works by Pauline Oliveros, Teodora Stepančić, Marguerite Brown
- We Who Walk Again - LP (Indexical, May 2018), works by Sky Macklay, Pauline Oliveros, Ben Richter
- Lightbulb Ensemble & Ghost Ensemble Live at Pioneer Works (Indexical, 2015)
