= Geisterbahn =

Play by Franz Xaver Kroetz

Geisterbahn (Ghost Train) is a play by Franz Xaver Kroetz. The sequel to Stallerhof (1971), it is cited as one of Kroetz's most important works in the period. Geisterbahn was written soon after Stallerhoff but remained unperformed until 1975.

The playwright Kroetz is known for his plays featuring severely mentally or emotionally impaired characters, often set in his native Bavaria. Geisterbahn and Stallerhoff are plays which are renowned for their sex and violence, with "graphic scenes of rape, defecation, masturbation, nudity, and an infanticide". During the play, Sepp and Beppi's child, born at the end of Stallerhof, is killed.
