= Josef Maria Horváth =

Austro-Hungarian composer (1931–2019)

- Horváth, date unknown
- Born: József Mária Horváth; 29 December 1931; Pécs, Hungary
- Died: October 21, 2019 (aged 87); Salzburg, Austria
- Occupations: Composer; Pianist; Conductor
- Works: List of compositions

Josef Maria Horváth (born József Mária Horváth; 20 December 1931 – 21 October 2019) was an Austrian composer of Hungarian descent, who wrote contemporary classical music. A Professor at the Mozarteum University Salzburg, he left his concert pianist and conductor career in 1964 to focus on composition. Horváth was among the most important 20th-century composers active in Salzburg.

== Life ==
Josef Maria Horváth was born on 20 December 1931 as József Mária Horváth in Pécs, Hungary. He learned to play the organ at the Jesuit School of his hometown. After high school he studied piano (receiving his diploma in 1956), music composition, and conducting at the Liszt Academy in Budapest. Horváth emigrated to Austria in 1956 to study at the Mozarteum University Salzburg in Salzburg. His studies lasted until 1959 with a focus on piano, composition and electronic music under Cesar Bresgen and Kurt Leimer.

After his 1959 graduation, Horváth led a career within Austria and abroad as a pianist, conductor and sometimes organist, described by his later publisher Doblinger as a "successful concert career" [erfolgreiche Konzerttätigkeit]. He often performed his own compositions.

Based in Salzburg, in 1964 Horváth left a career as a pianist to concentrating almost exclusively on composition. He joined the faculty of his alma mater, the Mozarteum University, from 1979 onwards as Professor of Music Theory and Practice of Contemporary Music and Counterpoint [Theorie und Praxis der Neuen Musik und Kontrapunkt].

Throughout his career, Horváth was commissioned by Australian Broadcasting Corporation, the Ensemble 20. Jahrhundert, and the Salzburg Festival, among other ensembles and organizations. According to composer Rupert Huber, Horváth's works are of impeccable craftsmanship and combine "compositional rigor and coherence with great beauty of sound". The musicologist Cliff Eisen described Horváth as among the most important 20th-century composers active in Salzburg. Horváth died on 21 October 2019 in Salzburg.

== Awards ==
- Lilli Lehmann Medal, 1959
- First Prize, International Composers' Competition from JMI, 1967
- Theodor Körner Prize, 1968
- Unnamed award from the Austrian Ministry of Education, 1973

== List of compositions ==
- Passacaglia, for string orchestra (1955)
- Entropia, symphony (1961)
- Trio for Violin, Horn and Piano (1963)
- Redundanz 1, for wind octet (1966)
- Redundanz 2, for string quartet (1967)
- Redundanz 3, for wind octet and string quartet (1968)
- Tombeau de Gigue, for orchestra (1971)
- Melencolia, for solo violin solo and orchestra (1972)
- Origines, for an chamber ensemble
- Sothis, for 13 instruments (1977)
- Sonata piccola, for organ (2005)
- Music for Wind Orchestra and Tape for the Salzburg Felsenreitschule. Collaborative composition with Gerhard Wimberger and Irmfried Radauer
- A Mass, Requiem and various songs
