= Peter Askim =

American composer and musician

- Born: Peter Askim
- Genres: classical
- Occupations: Composer, Conductor, Educator, Double bassist
- Instrument: Double bass
- Labels: Gasparo, Albany
- Website: http://www.peteraskim.com

Peter Askim is an American composer of modern classical music, conductor, music educator and a double bassist.

== Background ==
Born in Denmark, to a Norwegian father and an American mother, he grew up in Cumberland, Maine. He studied at the Hochschule für Musik und Darstellende Kunst in Vienna, and holds bachelors, masters and doctoral degrees from Yale University. He also holds a Doctor of Musical Arts degree in Composition from the University of Texas at Austin.

He studied composition with Dan Welcher, Donald Grantham, Anthony Davis, Jan Radzynkski, Syd Hodkinson and David Finko. His double bass instructors were George Rubino, Diana Gannett, Donald Palma, Wolfgang Harrer and Ludwig Streicher.

== Musical career ==
Active as a composer, conductor and double bassist, Peter Askim is currently the music director and composer-in-residence of the Idyllwild Arts Academy. He has been a member of the Honolulu Symphony Orchestra, and served on the faculty of the University of Hawaii at Manoa, where he directed the Contemporary Music Ensemble and taught bass, theory and composition. Numerous orchestras, music festivals and performers have commissioned work from Askim, including the Tokyo Symphony Orchestra, the Honolulu Symphony, Orchestra Asia-Japan, The Yale Symphony Orchestra, the Idyllwild Arts Orchestra, the Portland Chamber Music Festival, Serenata Santa Fe, Metropolitan Opera soprano Lauren Flanigan, and Grammy-nominated soprano Judith Kellock. His compositions are published by Liben Music Publishers, Discordia Music and the International Society of Bassists. His music is recorded on the Gasparo and Albany labels.

As a conductor, Askim has served as music director of Branford Chamber Orchestra, and makes frequent guest conducting appearances, including the Wroclaw (Poland) Chamber Orchestra Sotto Voce and the Honolulu Symphony Orchestra. He has premiered numerous works: most recently Swansong by Richard Danielpour.

He is a frequent recitalist for the International Society of Bassists and the International Contrabass Festival. He was a guest recitalist and teacher at the World Bass Festival in Wroclaw, Poland. He has also received critical praise as a jazz artist in JazzTimes, the New York Post and New York Newsday.

== Selected works ==
- Islands: Concerto for Double Bass and String Orchestra
- Moving, Still for Orchestra
- As Glaciers Thaw... for String Orchestra
- ...but the rain... for Shakuhachi and 21-string Koto
- Eight Solitudes for Bass and Piano
- Edge for Solo Double Bass
- Meridians for Orchestra
