= Lexington Symphony =

Orchestra based in Lexington, Massachusetts

- Orchestra
- Former name: Lexington Sinfonietta
- Founded: 1995
- Location: Lexington, Massachusetts, U.S.
- Principal conductor: Jonathan McPhee
- Website: www.lexingtonsymphony.org

Founded as the Lexington Sinfonietta in 1995 by conductor Hisao Watanabe, the Lexington Symphony is a group of professional musicians from the Lexington, Massachusetts, area. The orchestra's performing home is Cary Hall.

The Lexington Symphony performs a subscription series of Saturday evening and Sunday afternoon concerts each year in Lexington, including an April event linked to the town's historic heritage and Patriots' Day celebration. In 2012, to celebrate the town of Lexington's 300th anniversary, the orchestra premiered a work they commissioned from composer Sky Macklay called Dissolving Bands.

The Lexington Symphony frequently features musicians from the local area in its performances, such as Lexington residents and teachers Magdalena Richter, violinist, Sarah Takagi, pianist, Epp Sonin, soprano, Paul Carlson, pianist, and Thomas Stumpf, pianist, as well as high school students, including participants in Project STEP.

Other soloists include Irina Muresanu, Janna Baty, Gail Williams, Gale Fuller, Stefan Jackiw, Roger Tapping (formerly of the Takács Quartet), and Stephanie Chase. Scheduled soloists include David Deveau and guest conductor Bruce Hangen. In 2010, Lexington Symphony collaborated with Symphony New Hampshire for a performance of Mahler's Symphony No. 8.

== Community outreach ==
In 2009, the orchestra launched an interactive program for children called "Orchestrating Kids Through Classics" with a performance in Cary Hall in Lexington which was attended by third grade classes in the Lexington Public Schools. In 2011, the program expanded beyond Lexington to performances for elementary school students in Framingham, Massachusetts.

The Lexington Symphony is a partner in Music Matters, a program organized by the Massachusetts Teacher's Association and WCRB, which brings Lexington Symphony musicians to elementary schools throughout the Commonwealth. Members of the orchestra visit classes, demonstrate their instruments, and have the kids try it themselves.

In addition, smaller ensembles from the orchestra perform community outreach performances throughout the year as the Lexington Symphony Chamber Players. Local performances have taken place at the Lexington Historical Society's Munroe and Buckman Taverns, Depot Square Gallery, SAGE at Temple Isaiah, the Arts Walk and Shopper's Night, and Fiske Elementary School. Performance venues outside Lexington include MIT, Tufts and Brandeis. The Chamber Players have collaborated with the Museum of Fine Arts, Boston, in presentation of a lecture on early American instruments by Darcy Kuronen, the MFA's Curator of Musical Instruments, at Lexington's National Heritage Museum.

== Jonathan McPhee ==
Jonathan McPhee is the music director and conductor of the Lexington Symphony. He is also music director of the Boston Ballet Orchestra, and the Nashua Symphony Orchestra & Chorus in New Hampshire.

Recent guest engagements include the Portland Symphony Orchestra, Plymouth Philharmonic, Youngstown Symphony Orchestra, the Orquesta Sinfonica de Tenerife in Spain, and the Lithuanian National Orchestra. McPhee has also appeared with the BBC Scottish Symphony Orchestra, Buffalo Philharmonic, the Louisiana Philharmonic, The Hague Philharmonic, Rochester Philharmonic, San Francisco Symphony, Orchestre Colonne (Paris), the National Philharmonic in London, the Danish Radio Symphony Orchestra, and the Bergen Philharmonic Orchestra in Norway, among others. He has conducted for many of the world's premier dance companies, including the New York City Ballet, The Royal Ballet (England), Martha Graham Dance Company, National Ballet of Canada, and the Australian Ballet. In addition, McPhee has also conducted opera, appearing with Opera Boston, the American Opera Center in New York, and Boston University Opera.

McPhee is an artistic advisor for Young Audiences of Massachusetts and his work with Boston's WCRB-FM on Kids' Classical Hour resulted in a 1998 Gabriel Award.

Born in Philadelphia, McPhee received his licentiate from the London Royal Academy of Music and a B.M. and M.M. from the Juilliard School. While at Juilliard, McPhee was the recipient of a Naumburg Scholarship in Conducting and English Horn. He has studied with Leonard Brain, David Diamond, Thomas Stacy, Rudolf Kempe, Sixten Ehrling, and participated in master classes with Sir Georg Solti and James Levine at Juilliard.
