= American Experience season 33 =

American Experience
- Season 33
- No. of episodes: 8

Release
- Original network: PBS
- Original release: January 11 – September 28, 2021

Season chronology
- ← Previous; Season 32 Next → Season 34

Season thirty-three of the television program American Experience aired on the PBS network in the United States on January 11, 2021 and concluded on September 28, 2021. The season contained eight new episodes and began with the film The Codebreaker.

== Episodes ==
No. overall	No. in season	Title	Directed by	Written by	Original release date
351	1	"The Codebreaker"	Chana Gazit	Chana Gazit	January 11, 2021
A film about cryptanalyst Elizebeth Smith Friedman. Narrated by Kate Burton.
352	2	"Voice of Freedom"	Rob Rapley	Rob Rapley	February 15, 2021
A documentary that recounts the life of African-American contralto Marian Anderson and examines the 1939 DAR Constitution Hall controversy and her subsequent concert at the Lincoln Memorial. In 1939, the Daughters of the American Revolution (DAR) denied Anderson the opportunity to sing at the DAR Constitution Hall because of a DAR racial exclusion policy, causing First Lady Eleanor Roosevelt to resign her membership from the DAR in protest. Instead, Anderson performed an open-air concert on Easter Sunday, April 9, 1939, on the steps of the Lincoln Memorial in Washington, D.C. Anderson sang before a crowd of more than 75,000 people and a radio audience in the millions. Narrated by Renée Elise Goldsberry.
353	3	"The Blinding of Isaac Woodard"	Jamila Ephron	Jamila Ephron & Mark Zwonitzer	March 30, 2021
Black army sergeant Isaac Woodard, the victim of a horrific incident of racial violence, becomes a catalyst for the civil rights movement. Narrated by Andre Holland.
354	4	"American Oz"	Randall MacLowry & Tracy Heather Strain	Randall MacLowry & Tracy Heather Strain	April 19, 2021
The life of L. Frank Baum, author of The Wonderful Wizard of Oz and the popular series it inspired. Voice of L. Frank Baum: Michael Stuhlbarg.
355	5	"Billy Graham"	Sarah Colt	Keven McAlester	May 17, 2021
The life of Billy Graham, who became one of the most influential religious leaders of the 20th century.
356	6	"Sandra Day O'Connor: The First"	Michelle Ferrari	Michelle Ferrari	September 13, 2021
The life of Sandra Day O'Connor, who served as the first female associate judge on the U.S. Supreme Court. Narrated by Kate Burton.
357	7	"Citizen Hearst" (Part 1)"	Amanda Pollak	Gene Tempest	September 27, 2021
Narrated by Peter Krause.
358	8	"Citizen Hearst" (Part 2)"	Stephen Ives	Stephen Ives	September 28, 2021
Narrated by Peter Krause.
