= James Ilgenfritz =

American musician (born 1978)

- Born: November 16, 1978 (age 47)
- Origin: Monroe, Michigan, United States
- Genres: experimental; contemporary classical; jazz; microtonal
- Occupations: composer, performer
- Instrument: contrabass
- Labels: Infrequent Seams, Telegraph Harp, Indexical
- Website: https://www.jamesilgenfritz.net

James Ilgenfritz (born 1978) is an American composer, double bass player, and multi-instrumentalist based in Brooklyn, New York. He is also a jazz sideman.

As a composer, he is known for his surreal experimental multimedia chamber operas, including The Ticket That Exploded (2011, in residency at ISSUE Project Room), and I Looked At The Eclipse (2019, in residency at Roulette Intermedium), and frenetic chamber works including In The Summer Every Truth Is Like A Saturday (2019).

As a jazz and experimental music sideman, he has collaborated with Lukas Ligeti and Eyal Maoz (in the trio Hypercolor), Elliott Sharp, Pauline Oliveros, Roscoe Mitchell, Anthony Braxton, John Zorn, Miya Masaoka, JG Thirlwell, Annie Gosfield, SEM Ensemble, Liturgy, and Ghost Ensemble.

Ilgenfritz holds a bachelor's degree in jazz and contemporary improvisation from the University of Michigan (2002), where he studied with Steve Rush, Marion Hayden, Diana Gannett, and Stuart Sankey; a master's degree from the University of California, San Diego, where he studied with Mark Dresser, Charles Curtis, and Miller Puckette; and a Ph.D. from the University of California, Irvine (2023). He formerly taught at the Brooklyn Conservatory of Music, directing a Suzuki bass program there from 2011 through 2019.

== Discography ==
- You Scream A Rapid Language - CD (Infrequent Seams, December 2019)
- Opalescence - CD (Telegraph Harp, July 2018)
- Origami Cosmos - CD (Infrequent Seams, March 2017)
- The Ticket That Exploded (An Opera) - CD (Con D'Or, 2015)
- Compositions (Braxton) - CD (Infrequent Seams, 2012)
