= Catherine Lamb =

American composer and violist

Catherine Lamb (born 1982) is an American composer and violist, and a winner of the 2020 Ernst von Siemens Composer Prize.

== Career ==
Lamb was born in Olympia, Washington. She describes her music as exploring "the interaction of tone, summations of shapes and shadows, phenomenological expansions, the architecture of the liminal (states in between outside/inside), and the long introduction form". Most of her works explore extended harmonic spaces in just intonation. Lamb explained her compositional philosophy in The Wire: "I follow the philosophy that the most intense sound is not the most intensive... I don’t agree with those who believe that sounds need to be pushed in order to be physical, or that they need to be loud in order to hear difference or summation tones. Particularly when working with particular tonal colourations and shadings, the more the tones are played in a plain and relaxed manner with room to blossom, the more expressive and generative they might become.”

Lamb was also the film score composer for Anhe Ghore Da Daan. She has collaborated with Éliane Radigue, Marc Sabat, and Johnny Chang; received commissions from the BBC Scottish Symphony Orchestra, Ensemble Dedalus, Ensemble Musikfabrik, Ensemble Resonanz, Ghost Ensemble, EXAUDI, Konzert Minimal, the London Contemporary Orchestra, NeoN, Plus Minus Ensemble, Explore Ensemble, Yarn/Wire; and awards and grants from the Ernst von Siemens Composer Prize, Foundation for Contemporary Arts, Henry Cowell Foundation, and Akademie Schloss Solitude, among others.

Lamb studied at CalArts with James Tenney and Michael Pisaro and independently with Mani Kaul, and received her MFA from Bard College.

== Works ==
Lamb's notable works include divisio spiralis (2019), curvo totalitas, Parallaxis Forma (2016), muto infinitas (2016), Point/Wave (2015), Matter/Moving (2012), and the Prisma Interius series (2015–present). Lamb was commissioned by the BBC for Portions Transparent/Opaque, which premiered as the 13th performance of the 2023 BBC Proms.

== Discography ==
Lamb's music has been featured several times on the British experimental music label Another Timbre, with releases including, among other labels:

- three bodies (moving) (at53)
- Viola Torros, Catherine Lamb & Johnny Chang (at131)
- point/wave (at142)
- Atmospheres Transparent/Opaque, featuring Ensemble Dedalus (New World Records)
- Muto Infinitas (at173)
- String Quartets, with the JACK Quartet (Kairos)
- parallaxis forma (at215) featuring Explore Ensemble, Exaudi Vocal Ensemble, and Lotte Betts-Dean
- Prisma Interius VIII (at218)
- Curva Triangulus (at227) featuring Ensemble Proton
- interius/exterius, with Ghost Ensemble (greyfade)
