= Lilli Lehmann Medal =

Austrian music award

The Lilli Lehmann Medal is an award by the Mozarteum International Foundation, named in honour of soprano Lilli Lehmann.

== Recipients ==
Among the people who have received it are:

- Ruth Kemper
- Margaret Halstead, 1933
- Irmgard Seefried
- George Hadjinikos, 1949
- Maria Stader, 1950, 1956
- Hans Braun, 1950
- Julius Patzak, 1950
- Elisabeth Schwarzkopf, 1950
- Josef Maria Horváth, 1959
- Ingrid Haebler, before 1959
- Gwendolin Sims-Warren, 1963
- Rotraud Hansmann, 1966
- Thomas Stumpf, 1972
- Bettina Schoeller
- Evmorfia Metaxaki
- Gustav Kuhn
- Theo Alcántara
- Klaus Jäckle, 1990
- Irena Bespalovaite, 2001
- Sergio Cárdenas, 1975
- Alexandra Bauer, 2003
- Marie-Dominique Ryckmanns, 2022
