= American Experience season 32 =

American Experience
- Season 32
- No. of episodes: 8

Release
- Original network: PBS
- Original release: January 6 – July 7, 2020

Season chronology
- ← Previous; Season 31 Next → Season 33

Season thirty-two of the television program American Experience aired on the PBS network in the United States on January 6, 2020 and concluded on July 7, 2020. The season contained eight new episodes and began with the film McCarthy.

== Episodes ==
No. overall	No. in season	Title	Directed by	Written by	Original release date
343	1	"McCarthy"	Sharon Grimberg	Sharon Grimberg	January 6, 2020
344	2	"The Poison Squad"	John Maggio	John Maggio	January 28, 2020
Narrated by Corey Stoll.
345	3	"The Man Who Tried to Feed the World"	Rob Rapley	Rob Rapley	April 21, 2020
A film about Norman Borlaug, an American agronomist considered the father of the Green Revolution. Narrated by Michael Murphy.
346	4	"George W. Bush (Part 1)"	Jamila Ephron	Chris Durrance & Barak Goodman	May 4, 2020
Narrated by Corey Stoll.
347	5	"George W. Bush (Part 2)"	Jamila Ephron	Chris Durrance & Barak Goodman	May 5, 2020
Narrated by Corey Stoll.
348	6	"Mr. Tornado"	Michael Rossi	Michael Rossi	May 19, 2020
Narrated by Joe Morton.
349	7	"The Vote (Part 1)"	Michelle Ferrari	Michelle Ferrari	July 6, 2020
Narrated by Kate Burton. Voices: Patricia Clarkson, Audra McDonald, and Mae Whitman.
350	8	"The Vote (Part 2)"	Michelle Ferrari	Michelle Ferrari	July 7, 2020
Narrated by Kate Burton. Voices: Patricia Clarkson, Laura Linney, and Mae Whitman.
