= Thomas Stumpf =

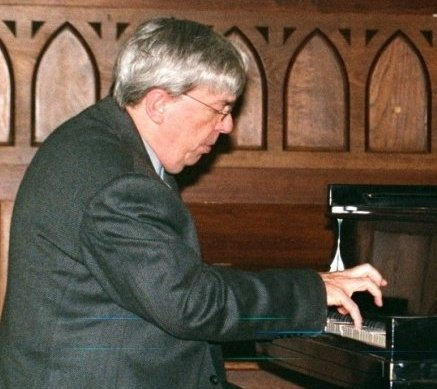

Background information
- Born: 1950/03/25; Shanghai, China
- Genre: Classical
- Occupations: Performer, teacher, composer
- Instrument: Piano
- Labels: Neuma, Albany Records

Thomas Stumpf is a classical pianist in the Boston area. He is also a conductor, composer, author, and teacher.

== Biography ==
Thomas Stumpf received his degrees in piano performance from the Mozarteum in Salzburg, Austria, and the New England Conservatory of Music in Boston. He was awarded the Bösendorfer Prize and the Lilli Lehmann Medal. He has appeared with the Hong Kong Philharmonic, the Boston Pops Orchestra (under Arthur Fiedler), Alea III (under Theodore Antoniou), and the Lexington Symphony. Stumpf is a well-known collaborative pianist, and in that role, he has performed with Rita Streich, Edith Mathis, D'Anna Fortunato, Richard Stoltzman, Jack Brymer, Walter Trampler and Leslie Parnas.

He has premiered many compositions by contemporary American composers and is a composer himself. Stumpf's compositions have appeared on concert programs in Boston, throughout the United States as well as in Germany and the U.S.S.R.; in 1992 he won the Kahn Award for his music theater project "Dark Lady," one section of which was recorded on the Neuma label by soprano Joan Heller. In 2005, his choral work “Though I walk” was premiered at St. Bartholomew's in New York City by the Pharos Music Project.

He is director emeritus of Music at Follen Church Society-Unitarian Universalist in Lexington, Massachusetts, where he conducted the Senior Choir in many major choral works, from Bach's St. Matthew Passion and Mozart's Requiem to Britten's "Ceremony of Carols" and the Sacred Concerts of Duke Ellington. In his spare time he also works on musicals with the two middle schools in Lexington. He also conducted the Follen Youth Choir, and directed the Youth and Junior Choirs every June in fully staged, double cast productions of Gilbert and Sullivan operettas. His experience at Follen led to his first book: a collection of essays entitled "A Sounding Mirror: Courage and Music in our Time," published in 2005 by Higganum Hill Books. He is also the co-founder and artistic director of Prism Opera, and has conducted and directed Mozart's "La Clemenza di Tito" (in his own translation), as well as operas by Britten, Vaughan Williams and Holst.

Stumpf has taught piano at the New England Conservatory and Boston University (where he was Chair of the Collaborative Piano Department from 1990 to 1997). He regularly gives master-classes at the Musikschule in Mannheim, Germany. He has taught at University of Massachusetts Lowell (where he has been the head of the keyboard department) and is currently on the Applied Music faculty at Tufts University.

== Awards ==
- Bösendorfer Prize (Vienna, 1970)
- Lilli Lehmann Medal (Salzburg, 1972)
- Kahn Award (Boston, 1992)
