= Sky Macklay =

American classical composer

Sky Macklay (born 1988) is an American composer of concert music and an oboist. She was winner of the Leo Kaplan Award (the top prize in the Morton Gould Young Composer Award of the American Society of Composers, Authors and Publishers) in 2013 and 2016. Born in Waseca, Minnesota, she completed a Doctor of Musical Arts degree in composition from Columbia University in the City of New York in 2018. She also holds degrees from The University of Memphis (MM) and Luther College (BA). She is a founding member of Ghost Ensemble. Previously, she served as Assistant Professor of Composition at Valparaiso University. and serves as Lecturer of Composition at the Peabody Institute.

== Biography ==
=== Early life and musical education ===
Macklay started off playing oboe at the age of 10, and was an active participant in choir growing up. She also picked up the piano around the age of 12. By the time she was in her late teens, 17 or 18, she started composing. This focus on composition was later formalized during her sophomore year of undergraduate studies for her BA degree at Luther College. Alongside her interest in composition, she did continue on with her studies in oboe, even through her MM degree at The University of Memphis.

Under the mentorship of George Lewis, Georg Friedrich Haas, and Fred Lerdahl, she completed her DMA degree in composition from Columbia University in the City of New York.

== Selected compositions ==
Macklay has published a complete list of her works. These include:

- Dissolving Bands (2012), an abstract orchestral reflection on the American Revolutionary War, commissioned by the Lexington Symphony and The Walden School for the tercentennial of Lexington, Massachusetts. The title is a reference to the United States Declaration of Independence. It won the 2013 Leo Kaplan Award, the top prize in the ASCAP Morton Gould Young Composer Awards.
- Harmonibots (2015), a sonic and kinetic installation of inflatable harmonica-playing robots commissioned by the International Alliance for Women in Music.
- Many Many Cadences (2016), a string quartet for Spektral Quartet, Macklay's second ASCAP Award recipient and a Grammy nominee.
