= Rafa Esparza =

American performance artist (born 1981)

rafa esparza
- Born: Rafael Esparza; 1981 (age 44–45); Los Angeles, California, U.S.
- Education: University of California, Los Angeles
- Known for: Performance Art
- Notable work: de la Calle (2019), staring at the sun (2019-2020)
- Awards: Pérez Prize (2022), Latinx Arts Fellowship, Mellon Foundation (2021), Lucas Artist Fellowship (2020), Louis Comfort Tiffany Foundation Award (2017), Art Matters Foundation Grant (2014), California Community Foundation Fellowship for Visual Artists (2014)

Rafael Esparza (born 1981 in Pasadena, California), is a multidisciplinary performance artist who works and lives in Los Angeles.

== Early life and education ==
Esparza was born and raised in Los Angeles, California, and is the son of Mexican immigrants from Durango, Mexico. He learnt to hand-make adobe bricks in 2014 after learning from his father.

He attended East Los Angeles College where he discovered the group Asco. Esparza later attended UCLA where he was influenced by works of Ron Athey.

== Work and career ==
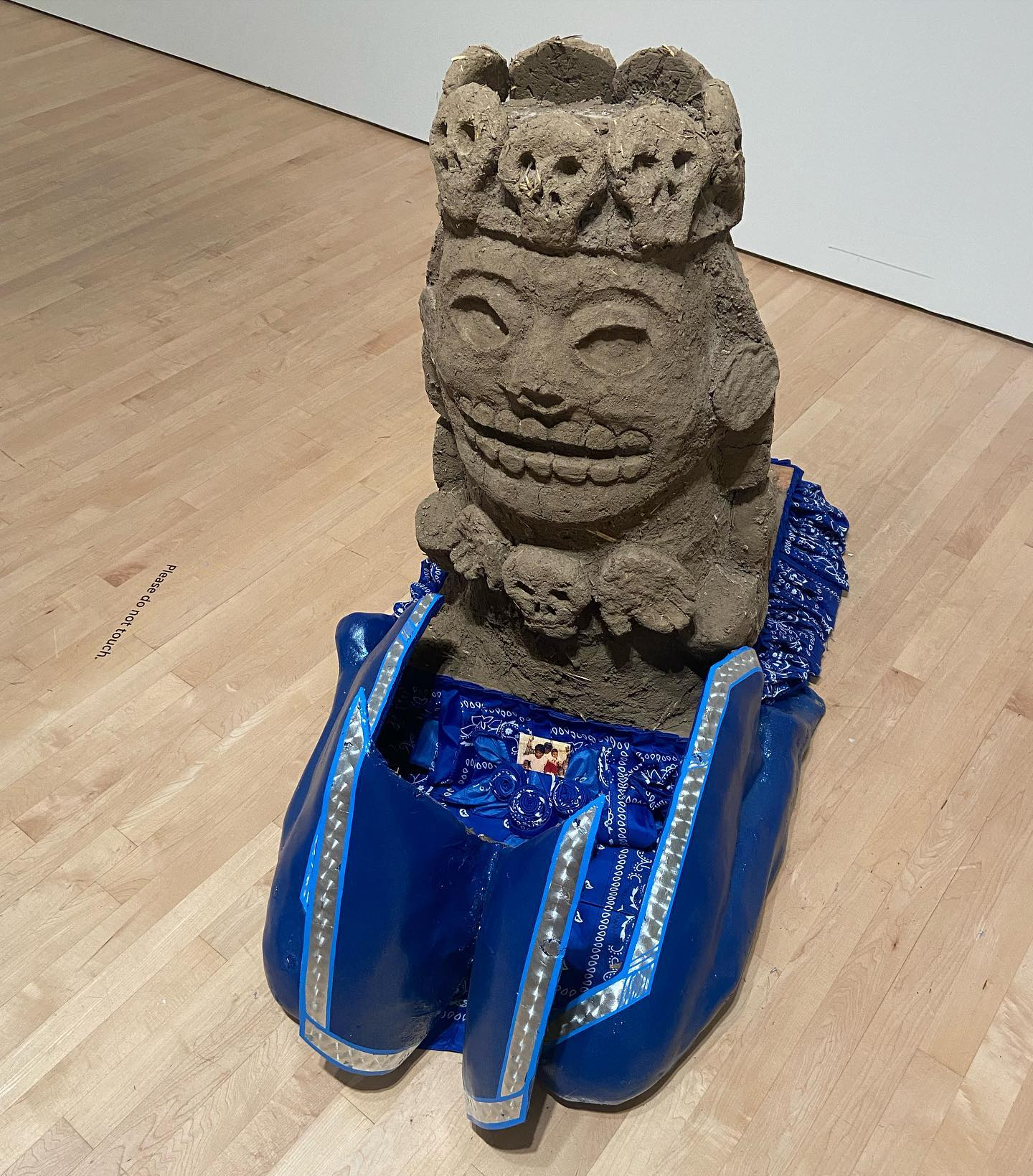
Close-up view of "Sitting in Chrome" exhibition, 2023

Esparza presented his solo exhibition, Staring at the Sun at MASS MoCA, North Adams, Massachusetts.

In 2013, Esparza performed chino, indio, negro with Sebastian Hernandez at Perform Chinatown 2013 near the site of the Chinese Massacre of 1871 in response to that event. Esparza performed El Hoyo with his brother, Beto Esparza, and fellow artist Nick Duran that same year.

He performed in Dorian Wood's "O" video.

Esparza buried various objects including corn cobs, a mailbox with a bullet hole through it, a recliner with a cactus planted in its seat, and two black folding chairs as part of the exhibition Made in L.A. 2016: a, the, though, only.

Esparza also collaborated with artist Cassils and 80 other artists to form In Plain Sight which aimed towards justice of immigration.

Esparza was included in the 2017 Whitney Biennial.

In 2015, Esparza performed Red Summer where he walked nearby a police academy firing range with a target on his back and fell to the ground everytime a bullet was heard for 12 hours.

In 2018, Esparza's performed his first solo mueseum presentation titled, de la Calle at the Institute of Contemporary Art, Los Angeles.

From January 20 - March 3, 2018, at the Commonwealth and Council Gallery, Esparza, in collaboration with Beatriz Cortez, had an exhibition named Pasado mañana which directly translates to "the day after tomorrow".

On September 21, 2019, Esparza performed bust: indestructible columns alongside sculptor Timo Fahler. Esparza incased himself waist-deep into a concrete cylinder and chiseled the concrete to free himself while wearing a black blazer and tie resembling an abolitionist orator.

In 2021, Esparza presented al Tempo at the Jeffrey Deitch Gallery which showcases an intimate scene two Latino gay men at a bar.

In 2021, Esparza's work, Yosi con Abuelita, which featured activist Yosimar Reyes with his grandmother was displayed at San Jose Museum of Art.

Esparza performed at the Art Basel Miami with a performance, titled Corpo RanfLA: Terra Cruiser in 2022 where he invited people to ride and mount him.

== Collections ==
Esparza's work has been showcased and included in many public art institutions including:

- Vincent Price Art Museum, Monterey Park, CA (2013)
- Clockshop, Bowtie Project, Los Angeles (2014)
- Los Angeles Contemporary Exhibitions, CA (2015)
- Armory Center for the Arts, Pasadena (2015)
- Hammer Museum, Los Angeles (2016)
- Bemis Center for Contemporary Art, Omaha, NE (2017)
- ArtPace, San Antonio, TX (2018)
- Museum of Contemporary Art, Los Angeles (2018)
- Performance Space New York and the Ellipse, Washington, D.C. (2019)
- Kohn Gallery, Los Angeles (2020)
- Commonwealth and Council, Los Angeles (2021)
- Art Basel Miami Beach, (2022)
- MASS MoCA, (2019)
- Pérez Art Museum Miami (2024)

== Awards ==
Esparza is the recipient of the 2022 Pérez Prize, the 2021 Latinx Arts Fellowship, Mellon Foundation, the 2020 Lucas Artist Fellowship, the Louis Comfort Tiffany Foundation Award in 2017, and California Community Foundation Fellowship for Visual Artists in 2014.
