= Gerd Kühr =

Austrian conductor, composer and academic teacher

- Born: 28 December 1952 (age 73); Maria Luggau, Austria
- Education: Mozarteum
- Occupations: Composer; Conductor; Academic teacher
- Notable work: operas, film music
- Awards: Ernst von Siemens Music Prize
- Website: www.gerd-kuehr.at

Gerd Kühr, also Gerd Kuhr (born 28 December 1952), is an Austrian conductor, composer of classical music and academic teacher. He is known for operas, such as Stallerhof on a libretto by the author of the play, Franz Xaver Kroetz, and film music including Schlöndorff's Eine Liebe von Swann.

== Career ==
Born in Maria Luggau, Kühr studied history, conducting and composition at the Mozarteum in Salzburg, and took master classes in conducting with Gerhard Wimberger, Hans Swarowsky and Sergiu Celibidache. He continued his studies of composition with Josef Friedrich Doppelbauer and Hans Werner Henze. In 1983 he collaborated with Henze, David Graham and Marcel Wengler to compose the film music for Volker Schlöndorff's Eine Liebe von Swann after Marcel Proust.

His opera Stallerhof, to a libretto of Franz Xaver Kroetz based on his own play, was premiered at the first Munich Biennale in 1988, as a co-production with the Staatstheater Wiesbaden. Ulf Schirmer conducted the premiere at the Kongresssaal of Deutsches Museum. The play Stallerhof, a dialect play on a taboo subject matter, was premiered in 1972. A review of the opera in a production of the Theater Luzern remarks:

Kroetz's Stallerhof is a work about inability to communicate, which opens space for music. Gerd Kühr's music serves the function of expressing the feelings and situations in which people find themselves. With a fairly large chamber orchestra he provides a rich tapestry of colours and motives. There is expressionist music, which brings to mind. the inarticulacy and exploitation suffered by Wozzeck.

Kühr composed in 1997/99 the opera Tod und Teufel (Death and Devil) on a libretto of Peter Turrini on a commission of the Theater Graz and the festival Steirischer Herbst on the occasion of the centennial of the opera house. Kühr composed the opera Agleia Federweiß in 2000/01 on a libretto of Petra Ernst, commissioned by the Jugendmusikfest Deutschlandsberg, a music festival for young people founded by Henze as part of the festival Steirischer Herbst.

Kühr taught from 1985 to 1994 in Graz, from 1992 to 1994 at the Mozarteum. Since 1995 he has been professor for composition at the Graz University of Music.

He was awarded the Ernst von Siemens Music Composers' Prize in 1995.

== Operas ==
Premiere	Title	Description	Libretto and source
3 June 1988, Munich Biennale	Stallerhof	Opera, 90'	Franz Xaver Kroetz, after his own play
17 September 1999, Grazer Oper/ Steirischer Herbst	Tod und Teufel	Opera, 105'	Peter Turrini, after his own play (1990)
24 October 2001, Deutschlandsberg	Agleia Federweiß	Kleine Oper, 75'	Petra Ernst
