= Stallerhof =

1971 play in three acts by Franz Xaver Kroetz

- A theatrical poster of a Stallerhof production in Cyprus
- Original language: German
- Written by: Franz Xaver Kroetz
- Characters: Beppi, Sepp, Staller, Stallerin
- Genre: Drama
- Setting: Farmhouse in Bavaria

Premiere
- Date: 24 June 1972
- Place: Deutsches Schauspielhaus, Hamburg

Stallerhof is a 1971 play in three acts by Franz Xaver Kroetz. Along with its sequel Geisterbahn (1975), it is regarded as one of Kroetz's most important works in the period. The play focuses on "the parent-child relationship between a farming couple and their myopic, retarded daughter Beppi, as well as on the relationship between the young girl and her lover, the old loner Sepp". The playwright Kroetz is known for his plays featuring severely mentally or emotionally impaired characters, often set in his native Bavaria.

== Content ==
Act 1

The intellectually disabled, shortsighted Beppi is regarded as a social disgrace by her parents, the farmer Staller and his wife. The permanent pressure to which Beppi is exposed takes its toll. When she is unable to read a letter without making mistakes, she is slapped. But when she is left to herself, she can read it perfectly.

The only one who treats her well is Sepp, an almost 60-year-old labourer. He tells her a touching story about North American Indians in which a woman outcast by her tribe is rescued by a white man. The labourer, downtrodden by Beppi's parents, longs for freedom and independence, but is unable to fulfill his social and sexual desires. He can only act as master towards his dog.

Act 2

Beppi and Sepp take a ride on a ghost train in an amusement park. Sepp initially comforts the frightened Beppi, but then seduces her. Afterwards he takes her to a restaurant, increasingly developing his new role as her master and protector.

When Beppi's parents discover the affair, Staller loses his temper, confronts Sepp, and poisons the dog in revenge. Sepp has to leave the farm and gives Beppi a bar of chocolate as a leaving present.

Act 3

Staller and his wife argue about what to do with their pregnant daughter, even contemplating murder. They want her to have an abortion, but don't force it on her out of pity. Like it or not, Beppi must now be taken more seriously than in the past. The play ends with the onset of her labour pains.

== Sex and violence ==
Stallerhoff and Geisterbahn, both first published in 1971, (although Geistbahn was not performed until 1975) are plays which are known for their sex and violence, with "graphic scenes of rape, defecation, masturbation, nudity, and an infanticide". In another play, two of the protagonists take turns to shoot and wound each other. The "only action" in the third scene of this play is said to be the sight of the ageing farmhand masturbating whilst sitting on a toilet.

== Reception ==
The premiere of the stage play was in Hamburg's Deutsches Schauspielhaus on 24 June 1972, directed by Ulrich Heising, who was known for social criticism. It made the 18-year-old actress Eva Mattes, who was seen nude for half a scene, famous. Reinhard Baumgart wrote on June 26 in the Süddeutsche Zeitung that the Beppi played by Mattes gained an aura that Kroetz had probably not even planned. Mattes received the Hamburg Island Award for Best Actress of the Year for her performance in 1972. The film scholar Michael Töteberg has stated that no later production reached the intensity of the first one.

Mel Gussow, who attended a 1981 performance at the Theater for the New City, dubbed the play "compulsively fascinating". He noted "the author's unconventional artistry and his radical line of vision. [...] though his observations seem dispassionate, his play is suffused with primitive emotions, and there is even a kind of beauty." He said that both Request Concert and Farmyard "are not plays that one is likely to forget." A Boston production, titled Staller's Farm, ran from May 6 to June 5, 1982. In The Boston Phoenix, Carolyn Clay noted that "The events of this play are simple, scatological, and crude; the language is (in critic Richard Gilman's words) 'maimed' and 'stricken'; and the feelings are like bare, anguished faces without any mouths." Farmyard was described as "haunting" in a 2006 issue of Theatre Record.

Stallerhof was translated into Hebrew and in 1986 performed at the Habima National Theatre in Israel. After attending a 2006 performance at the Southwark Playhouse, Philip Fisher argued that the work "can hardly be described as cheerful but it is moving and puts on stage a stratum of society rarely thrown into the limelight." In 2014 the play enjoyed a tour across Cyprus by the ONE/OFF group, performed in Greek.

=== Sequel ===
In 1975, Stallerhof was followed by the sequel Geisterbahn, which ends with Sepp and Beppi's child being killed.

=== Opera ===
In 1988 the Austrian composer Gerd Kühr wrote an opera of the same title, on a libretto by Kroetz, closely modeled on the original. It was premiered at the first Munich Biennale. A review notes: "Kroetz's Stallerhof is a work about inability to communicate, which opens space for music. ... There is expressionist music, which brings to mind. the inarticulacy and exploitation suffered by Wozzeck. In 2006 it was revived at the Southwark Playhouse in London.
