= American Experience season 31 =

American Experience
- Season 31
- No. of episodes: 7

Release
- Original network: PBS
- Original release: January 15 – September 10, 2019

Season chronology
- ← Previous; Season 30 Next → Season 32

Season thirty-one of the television program American Experience aired on the PBS network in the United States on January 15, 2019 and concluded on September 10, 2019. The season contained seven new episodes and began with the film The Swamp.

== Episodes ==
No. overall	No. in season	Title	Directed by	Written by	Original release date
336	1	"The Swamp"	Randall MacLowery	Teleplay by : Michelle Ferrari & Randall MacLowry; Story by : Randall MacLowry	January 15, 2019
Narrated by Tim Hopper.
337	2	"Sealab"	Stephen Ives	Stephen Ives	February 12, 2019
Narrated by Michael Murphy.
338	3	"Chasing the Moon (Part 1)"	Robert Stone	Robert Stone	July 8, 2019
339	4	"Chasing the Moon (Part 2)"	Robert Stone	Robert Stone	July 9, 2019
340	5	"Chasing the Moon (Part 3)"	Robert Stone	Robert Stone	July 10, 2019
341	6	"Woodstock"	Barak Goodman	Barak Goodman & Don Kleszy	August 6, 2019
342	7	"The Feud"	Randall MacLowry	Randall MacLowry	September 10, 2019
Narrated by Michael Murphy.
