= American Experience season 37 =

2025 season of television series

American Experience
- Season 37
- No. of episodes: 7

Release
- Original network: PBS
- Original release: February 25 – October 28, 2025

Season chronology
- ← Previous; Season 36

Season thirty-seven of the television program American Experience aired on the PBS network in the United States on February 25, 2025 and concluded on October 28, 2025. The season contained seven new episodes and began with the film Forgotten Hero: Walter White and the NAACP.

== Episodes ==
No. overall	No. in season	Title	Directed by	Written by	Original release date
381	1	"Forgotten Hero: Walter White and the NAACP"	Michelle Smawley	Rob Rapley	February 25, 2025
382	2	"Change, Not Charity: The Americans with Disabilities Act"	James LeBrecht	Chana Gazit	March 25, 2025
383	3	"Mr. Polaroid"	Gene Tempest	Gene Tempest	May 19, 2025
384	4	"Clearing the Air: The War on Smog"	Peter Yost	Peter Yost & Edna Alburquerque	August 26, 2025
385	5	"Hard Hat Riot"	Marc Levin	Marc Levin & Daphne Pinkerson	September 30, 2025
386	6	"Kissinger (Part One)"	Barak Goodman	Barak Goodman	October 27, 2025
387	7	"Kissinger (Part Two)"	Barak Goodman	Barak Goodman	October 28, 2025
388	8	"Bombshell"	Ben Loeterman	Ben Loeterman	January 6, 2026
