= American Experience season 36 =

2024 season of television series

American Experience
- Season 36
- No. of episodes: 7

Release
- Original network: PBS
- Original release: January 23 – November 30, 2024

Season chronology
- ← Previous; Season 35 Next → Season 37

Season thirty-six of the television program American Experience aired on the PBS network in the United States on January 23, 2024 and is scheduled to conclude on November 30, 2024. The season contained seven new episodes and began with the film Nazi Town USA.

== Episodes ==
No. overall	No. in season	Title	Directed by	Written by	Original release date
374	1	"Nazi Town, USA"	Peter Yost	Peter Yost	January 23, 2024
375	2	"Fly With Me"	Sarah Colt & Helen Dobrowski	Sarah Colt	February 20, 2024
376	3	"The Cancer Detectives"	Amanda Pollak & Gene Tempest	Gene Tempest	March 26, 2024
377	4	"Poisoned Ground: The Tragedy at Love Canal"	Jamila Ephron	Jamila Ephron	April 22, 2024
378	5	"The Riot Report"	Michelle Ferrari	Michelle Ferrari & Jelani Cobb	May 21, 2024
379	6	"The American Vice President"	Michelle Ferrari	Michelle Ferrari	October 1, 2024
380	7	"American Coup: Wilmington 1898"	Brad Lichtenstein & Yoruba Richen	Brad Lichtenstein, Yoruba Richen & Peter Miller	November 12, 2024
