= American Experience season 35 =

American Experience
- Season 35
- No. of episodes: 9

Release
- Original network: PBS
- Original release: January 3 – October 30, 2023

Season chronology
- ← Previous; Season 34 Next → Season 36

Season thirty-five of the television program American Experience aired on the PBS network in the United States on January 3, 2023 and concluded on October 30, 2023. The season contained nine new episodes and began with the film The Lie Detector.

== Episodes ==
No. overall	No. in season	Title	Directed by	Written by	Original release date
365	1	"The Lie Detector"	Rob Rapley	Rob Rapley	January 3, 2023
Narrated by Andre Braugher. This was his last television role before his death in December 2023.
366	2	"Zora Neale Hurston: Claiming a Space"	Tracy Heather Strain	Tracy Heather Strain	January 17, 2023
Narrated by Vanessa Williams. Voice of Zora Neale Hurston: Bahni Turpin.
367	3	"Ruthless: Monopoly's Secret History"	Stephen Ives	Stephen Ives	February 20, 2023
368	4	"The Movement and the 'Madman'"	Stephen Talbot	(none credited)	March 28, 2023
369	5	"The Sun Queen"	Amanda Pollak	Gene Tempest	April 4, 2023
370	6	"Casa Susanna"	Sébastien Lifshitz	Sébastien Lifshitz	June 27, 2023
371	7	"The Busing Battleground"	Sharon Grimberg & Cyndee Readdean	Sharon Grimberg	September 11, 2023
372	8	"The Harvest: Integrating Mississippi's Schools"	Douglas A. Blackmon & Sam Pollard	Douglas A. Blackmon	September 12, 2023
373	9	"The War on Disco"	Lisa Quijano Wolfinger	Rushmore Denooyer	October 30, 2023
