= Elizabeth Blancas =

Xicana artist

Elizabeth Blancas is a first generation queer Xicana artist based in the Bay Area. She specializes in muralism and screen printing and exploring themes around sexuality, culture, identity, and womanhood.

== Selected works ==
" Tú Eres Mi Otro Yo"

"Tú Eres Mi Otro Yo" is a mural installation commissioned by the San Francisco COVID Command Center in Clarion Alley. The mural is focused on nationally acclaimed Latinx poet, Yosimar Reyes and his grandmother Mardonia Galeana wearing masks with text saying "you are the other me" in Spanish. Yosimar Reyes and Elizabeth Blancas met in 2014 where they worked in a Misson-based art space known as Galeria de La Raza. When Blancas was commissioned for this piece she wanted to stress the importance of inter-generational care in the Latinx community, as well as uplifting the undocumented community. The mural was in collaboration with Clarion Alley Mural Project otherwise known as CAMP, a collective of murals artists who push forward creative socially engaged murals.

"Tomorrow's World is Yours to Build"

"Tomorrow's World is Yours to Build" is the first ever mural installation at Chabot Community College in Hayward, California. The mural was initiated in 2018 by student activists a part of the Stay Woke Collective, a student run club hopping to unite community in bringing social change on campus. The project is supported by Ethnic Studies faculty and the Public Art Committee.The phrase "Tomorrow's World is Yours to Build" is a quote by Yuri Kochiyama a Japanese American rights activist from the Bay Area. Blancas, states "She was one of the voices I kept coming back to when designing the mural. A large part of the design process happened amidst a chaotic time, 2020-2021. With an ongoing pandemic, state sanctioned violence, civil unrest, and climate catastrophe all occurring– “tomorrow” felt so bleak. I hope Kochiyama's words offer our community the [same] solace and empowerment they gave me.” The mural features two Chabot college students Salimah “Mrs.Mak” Shabazz and Taufa Setefano, close friends of Blancas.

"Women and two Spirits are the Backbone of Every Tribe"

"Women and two Spirits are the Backbone of Every Tribe" is part of series of mural installations by ten indigenous artists as part of Unceded Voices, a convergence of Indigenous identified women. This mural highlights two women who were key figures in protesting against the pipeline in Standing Rock.

== Bibliography ==
- Dolkart, Andrew Scott (2003), "Haight, Charles C(oolidge)", Oxford Art Online, Oxford University Press, retrieved 2022-02-28
- Montes, Daniel; News, Bay City (2021-05-03). "S.F. mural celebrates Latino community, spotlight impacts of COVID pandemic". Local News Matters. Retrieved 2022-02-26.
  - This is a peer-reviewed news article, so it should be a reliable source. It covers the depth of one of her newest mural installations in the San Francisco, Bay Area.
- Reyes, Sean (2021-03-12). "Mural: Photo Essay". El Tecolote. Retrieved 2022-02-26.
  - This is a peer-reviewed bi-weekly newspaper article, so it should be a reliable source.It's helpful in establishing notability.
- Daly, Clara-Sophia (2021-06-16). "New murals honor Chicana artist Yolanda López and pay homage to Bay Area solidarity movements". Mission Local. Retrieved 2022-02-26.
  - This is a peer-reviewed newspaper article that should be a credible and reliable source.
- Mateo, Michaela (2022-01-21). "Tomorrow's World is Yours to Build". The Chabot Spectator. Retrieved 2022-02-26.
  - This is a community college newspaper, so it should be a reliable source for notability.
- UNCEDED VOICES #1 – Elizabeth Blancas, retrieved 2022-02-28
  - A docu-series about Unceded Voices and the focus on Elizabeth Blancas.
- "Unceded Voices paints Indigenous perspectives". The Eastern Door. 2017-08-18. Retrieved 2022-02-28.
