= Dorian Wood =

American musician, artist and writer

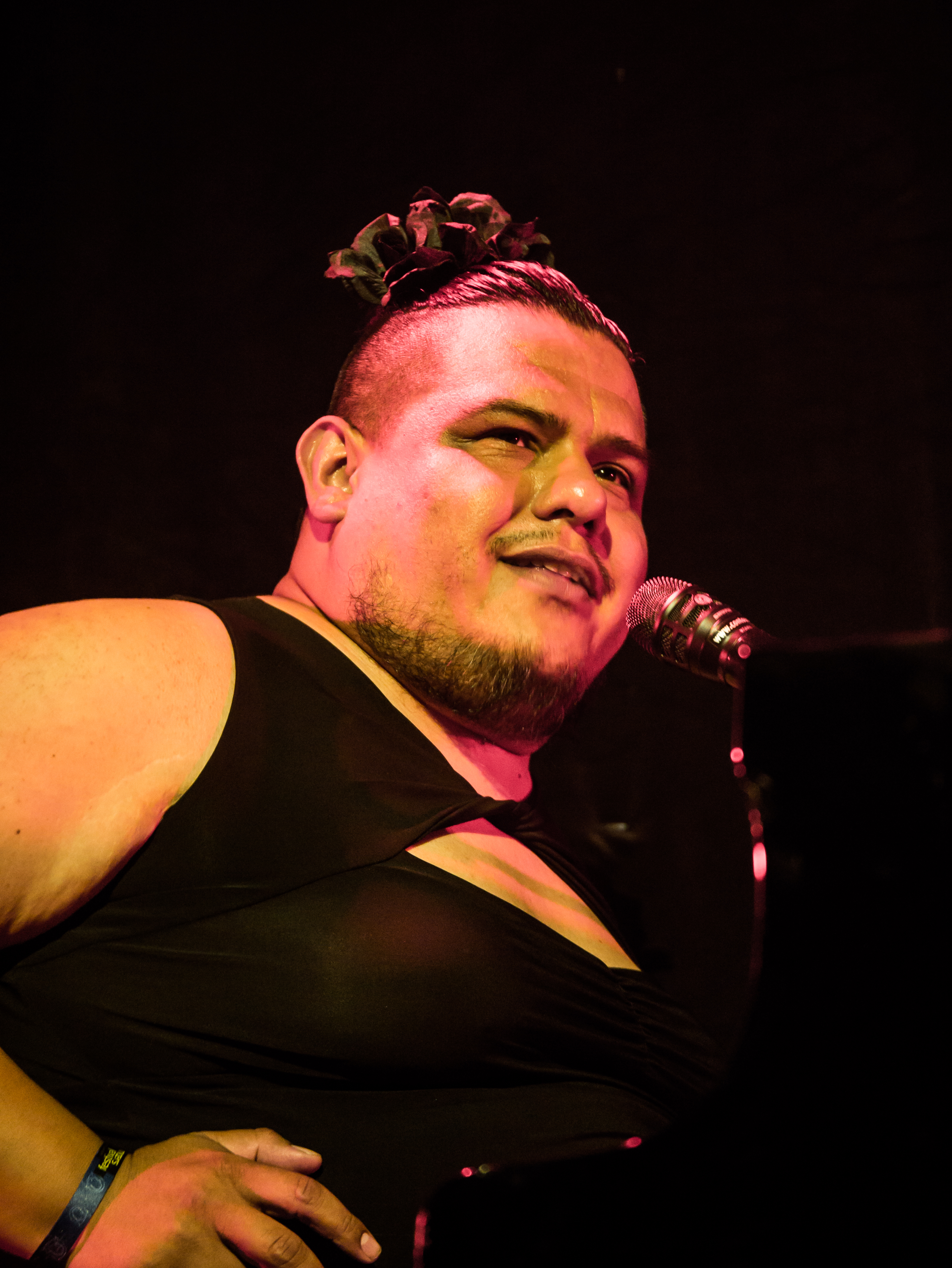
- Dorian Wood at the Moers Festival 2017
- Born: 1975 (age 50–51); Los Angeles, California
- Occupations: Singer, composer, performance artist, visual artist, writer

Dorian Wood (born 1975) is an American singer, composer, performance artist, visual artist, and writer.

== Early life and education ==
Wood was born in Los Angeles, California to Costa Rican parents. They began their musical education at a very early age, under the tutelage of their grandfather, the pianist Calasanz Alvarez. In their early teens, Wood's parents divorced, and Wood's mother moved them and their sisters to Costa Rica. They continued their studies at the Conservatorio de Castella, and after graduating, they made their way back to Los Angeles. They studied film at Los Angeles City College for two years but then dropped out to concentrate on music. Wood first gained exposure performing on the gay bar circuit.

== Career ==
Wood released their debut album, BOLKA, independently in 2006. Produced by Rebecca Stout, BOLKA received wide critical acclaim for its impeccable merging of folk, soul, Bulgarian choral music and experimental music. They quickly followed up BOLKA with the EP, Black Pig Suite. In 2010, they released the album Brutus, which featured only Wood on vocal and piano, and was recorded live at the church St. Giles in the Fields in London, in the midst of their European tour.

Wood was a member of the Los Angeles-based experimental orchestra Killsonic for three years. Wood received critical praise for their performance and "picture perfect" art direction (Los Angeles Times) in the Killsonic opera, Tongues Bloody Tongues, presented at the REDCAT in Los Angeles in 2010. Wood performed at the REDCAT again in 2011 in the opera Zoophilic Follies, along with Timur and The Dime Museum.

In 2011, Wood was commissioned by LACE (Los Angeles Contemporary Exhibitions) to present a new work for the performance series Los Angeles Goes Live, part of Pacific Standard Time. Wood's performance installation, Athco, Or The Renaissance of Faggot Tree, incorporated over 30 performers, and was presented at Barnsdall Art Park. That same year, Wood performed with acclaimed artist Marina Abramović in her piece An Artist's Life Manifesto, presented at the Museum of Contemporary Art, Los Angeles.

Wood released the album Rattle Rattle in 2013. An epic collection of original doomsday-themed songs that form one strong, continuous piece, Rattle Rattle incorporated over 60 musicians, including a 45-member choir assembled by Wood themself, The Difficult Women, as well as duets with Angela Correa (Correatown, Les Shelleys) and Nina Savary. Wood directed the controversial video for the first single "La Cara Infinita" (a duet with Eddika Organista), which featured a guest appearance by Margaret Cho. Wood's following video for their single "O" featured performance artist Rafa Esparza and model/make-up artist Taryn Piana.

In October 2014, Wood toured Europe in support of the release of their EP, Down, The Dirty Roof, via Atonal Industries. In 2015, Wood released a digital EP, "Hymn to Freedom", also via Atonal Industries.

In May 2017, Wood released the album XALÁ. Recorded at the Auditori Municipal in Vila-Real, Spain, "XALÁ" is their first full-length release recorded completely in Spanish. Described by Wood as an exploration and simultaneous devaluing of hyper masculinity, they are accompanied on the recording by bassist Xavi Muñoz and percussionist Marcos Junquera.

In April 2019, Wood debuted their orchestral tribute project to iconic Mexican-Costa Rican singer Chavela Vargas, XAVELA LUX AETERNA, at the Festival Internacional de Arte Sacro in Madrid. The project was created in collaboration with Spanish artist Alberto Montero. The project toured Europe, the U.S. and Mexico from 2019 through the beginning of 2020. In May 2020, Wood released the EP Paloma, which was recorded at Teatro Real Coliseo de Carlos III in Spain, during the final concert of the tour.

Wood announced in 2020 the release of two back-to-back albums, ARDOR and REACTOR. The albums were recorded during an artist residency at Human Resources LA.

In 2022, Wood debuted their tribute to the singer Lhasa De Sela, entitled LHASA, at the Festival Internacional de Arte Sacro in Madrid, in collaboration with singer Carmina Escobar and composer Adrián Cortés.

== Discography ==
- BOLKA (2006)
- Black Pig Suite EP (2009)
- Brutus (2010)
- Glassellalia EP (2012)
- Pearline EP (2012)
- Rattle Rattle (2013)
- La Cara Infinita EP (2013)
- Down, The Dirty Roof EP (2014)
- Hymn to Freedom EP (2015)
- Ten Bowie Songs (2016)
- XALÁ (2017)
- Segua EP (2018)
- Rhythm Nation 1814 (Live at Human Resources) (2019)
- Paloma EP (2020)
- ARDOR (2020)
- REACTOR (2020)
- Invasiva (2022)
- Philomeno EP (2022)

== Personal life ==
Wood is genderfluid and uses she/her and they/them pronouns.
