= Gerhard Wimberger =

Austrian composer and conductor

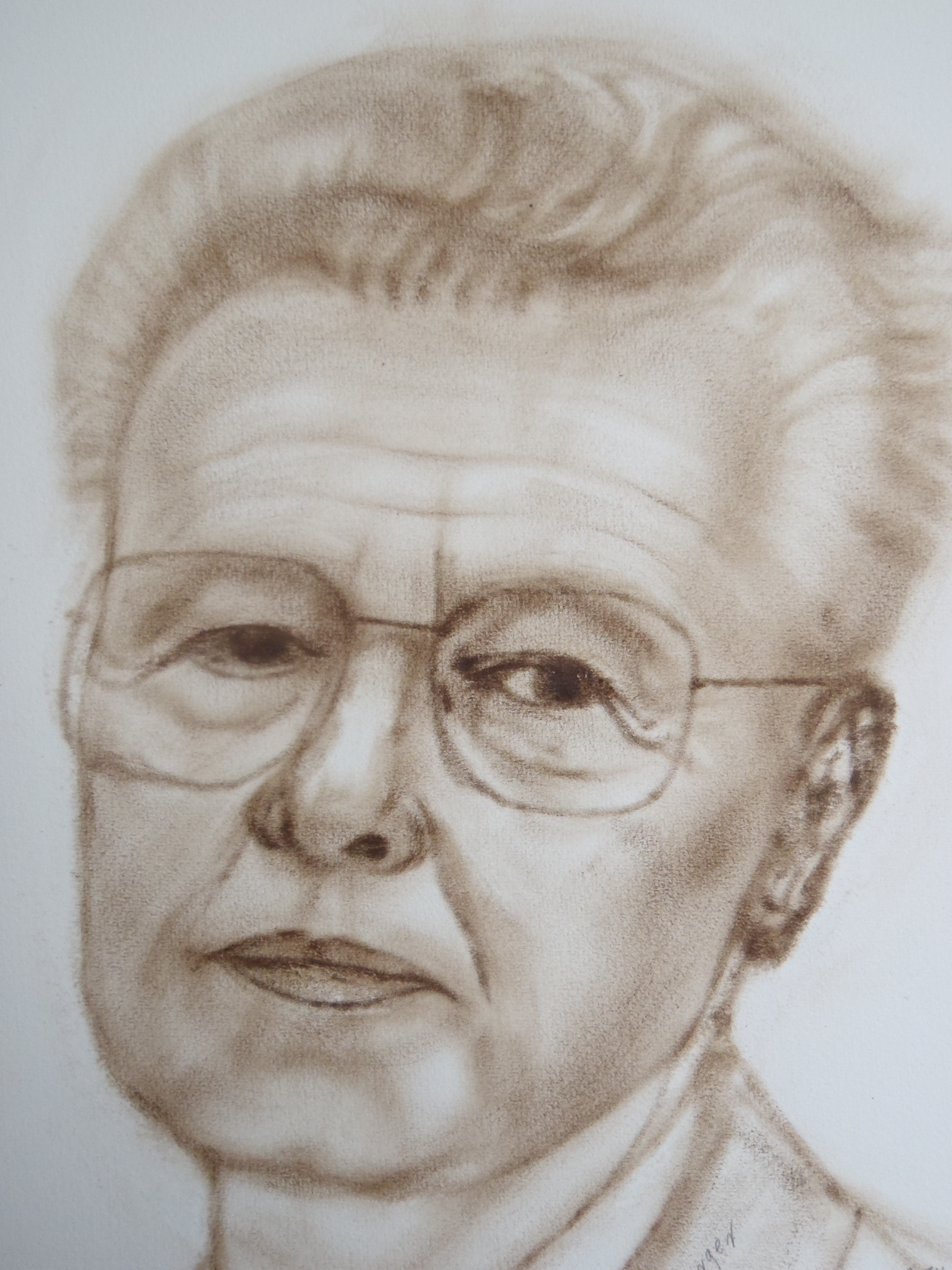
- Born: 30 August 1923; Vienna, Austria
- Died: 12 October 2016 (aged 93); Salzburg, Austria
- Education: Mozarteum
- Occupations: Composer; Academic teacher
- Works: List of compositions

Gerhard Wimberger (30 August 1923 – 12 October 2016) was an Austrian composer and conductor.

== Career ==
Born in Vienna on 30 August 1923, Wimberger studied at the Mozarteum in Salzburg. His teachers were Cesar Bresgen and Johann Nepomuk David for composition, and Clemens Krauss and Bernhard Paumgartner for conducting.

After World War II, in which he served in the army, he worked as vocal coach at the Vienna Volksoper, then as conductor at the Landestheater in Salzburg, before becoming a teacher for conducting and composition at the Mozarteum. Among his many pupils were Klaus Ager, Sergio Cárdenas, Dieter Lehnhoff, and Gerd Kühr. Wimberger also served as member of the directory of the Salzburg Festival, and as president of the Austrian Composers' Association AKM.

Wimberger died on 12 October 2016 at the age of 93. A memorial concert was held in his honor at the Mozarteum in January 2017.

== Scenic works ==
- Heinrich und Kleist, Scenes for Music Theatre (2004), chamber opera (2011)
- Wolf Dietrich Prince of Salzburg (1985/87), scenic chronicles
- Paradou (1981/58), opera after Émile Zola
- The Golden Shoes (1983), ballet music for television
- Jedermann (1983), incidental music
- Rules of Life (1970/73), scenic music
- Helen the Victim (1967), musical
- Dame Kobold (1964)
- Lady Clown (1963/64), musical comedy
- Hero and Leander (1962/63), dance drama
- La Battaglia or the Red Feathers, opera
- Display Story (1952/53)

== Concert music ==
- Musica Cellisima (2003), cello and orchestra
- Musica Tranquilla (2000), orchestra
- Strange Evening Music (1999), chamber orchestra
- Flows (1997), string sextet
- Combophony (1995), 7 instruments
- Premonitions (1994), orchestra
- Burletta (1993), violin, piano
- In the Name of Love (1992), tenor, piano
- Dance Concerto (1991/92), chamber orchestra
- Vanity in the Life of a Manager (1991/92), voices and orchestra
- Disegni (1991), piano
- Three Sonatas for Synthesizer (1990–91)
- Quintet (1990), classical wind quintet
- Diary 1942 (1990/91), baritone, chorus, orchestra
- Concerto for Synthesizer (1989)
- Vagabondage (1988), big band
- We Do Not Stop Breathing, mezzo-soprano, piano
- Night Music Mourning Music Final Music (1987/88), orchestra
- Fantasy for Eight Players (1982), octet
- Concertino per Orchestra (1981)
- Chromatic Variation on a Waltz by Diabelli (1981), piano
- Second Piano Concerto (1980/81), piano, orchestra
- Six Love Songs on Baroque Texts (1980), baritone and harpsichord or piano
- Sonetti in vita e in morte di Madonna Laura (1979), a cappella chorus
- Projections on Themes of W. A. Mozart (1978), orchestra
- Programme (1977/78), large orchestra
- String Quartet (1978/79)
- Concerto for Twelve Players (1978/79)
- Contours (1977), piano
- My Life, My Death (1976), baritone, instruments, and tape
- Motus (1976), large orchestra
- Plays (1975), 12 cellos, winds, and percussion
- Short Stories (1974/75), eleven winds
- Memento Vivere (1973/74), mezzo-soprano, baritone, 3 speakers, choir, orchestra
- Mulitiplay – Canonic Reflections (1972/73), 23 players
- Signum (1969), organ
- Four Songs (1969), voice and instruments
- Chronique (1968/69), orchestra
- Ars Amatoria (1967), cantata for chorus, combo, and chamber orchestra
- Four Movements on German Folksongs (1966), soprano, 3 instruments, chorus
- Risonanze (1965/66), three orchestral groups
- Kästner-Songbook (1962), medium voice, piano
- Stories (1962), winds and percussion
- Three Lyrical Chansons (1957), voice and chamber orchestra
- Wedding Mail Cantata (1957), mixed chorus, harpsichord, and double bass
- Allegro giocoso (1956), orchestra
- Agustin Variations-Loga-rhythms (1956), orchestra
- Figures and Fantasies (1956), orchestra
- Concerto for Piano and Chamber Orchestra (1955)
- Divertimento (1954), string orchestra
- Musica Brevis (1950), orchestra

== Literature ==
- Goertz, Harald; Wimberger, Gerhard (1991). Gerhard Wimberger (in German). Wien: E. Lafite, Österreichischer Bundesverlag. ISBN 978-3-215-07700-5. OCLC 23985854.

== Decorations and awards ==
- 1967: Austrian State Prize for Music in the field of composition
- 1979: Austrian Ministry of Education, Science and Culture Prize for Music
- 1983: Austrian Cross of Honour for Science and Art, 1st class
- 1991: Grand Decoration of Honour in Silver for Services to the Republic of Austria
- 1992: Honorary Member of the Mozarteum University of Salzburg
- 1994: Silver Mozart Medal of the International Mozarteum Foundation
- 1998: Honorary Member of the International Mozarteum Foundation
- 2003: Ring of Salzburg
- Gold decoration of Salzburg
