= American Experience season 34 =

American Experience
- Season 34
- No. of episodes: 6

Release
- Original network: PBS
- Original release: February 7 – November 15, 2022

Season chronology
- ← Previous; Season 33 Next → Season 35

Season thirty-four of the television program American Experience aired on the PBS network in the United States on February 7, 2022 and concluded on November 15, 2022. The season contained six new episodes and began with the film Riveted: The History of Jeans.

== Episodes ==
No. overall	No. in season	Title	Directed by	Written by	Original release date
359	1	"Riveted: The History of Jeans"	Michael Bicks & Anna Lee Strachan	Michael Bicks & Anna Lee Strachan	February 7, 2022
360	2	"The American Diplomat"	Leola Calzolai-Stewart	Ken Chowder	February 15, 2022
Narrated by Andre Braugher.
361	3	"Flood in the Desert"	Rob Rapley	Rob Rapley	May 3, 2022
Narrated by Andre Braugher.
362	4	"Plague at the Golden Gate"	Li-Shin Yu	Susan Kim	May 24, 2022
Narrated by Lea Salonga.
363	5	"Taken Hostage (Part One)"	Robert Stone	Robert Stone	November 14, 2022
An exploration into the backstory of how the United States became involved in the Middle East and the nation's role that led to the Iranian Revolution and the Iran hostage crisis.
364	6	"Taken Hostage (Part Two)"	Robert Stone	Robert Stone	November 15, 2022
