= Request Concert (play) =

1971 wordless monodramatic play

- Original title: Wunschkonzert
- Written by: Franz Xaver Kroetz
- Subject: Mental illness, social isolation, suicide
- Genre: Drama

Premiere
- Date premiered: 1973
- Place premiered: Staatstheater Stuttgart Stuttgart, Germany

Request Concert (German: Wunschkonzert), also known as Request Program or Request Programme, is a wordless monodramatic play written by Franz Xaver Kroetz. The play was originally written in 1971 and premiered in 1973 at the Staatstheater Stuttgart in Stuttgart, Germany.

== Plot ==
A middle-aged woman arrives at her apartment, where she lives in solitude. She quietly navigates through her evening routine, which includes preparing dinner and cleaning. Searching for a distraction, she tunes into a radio program. She is visibly melancholy, speaking to no one, not even herself. As the night progresses, she succumbs to an unfortunate fate.

== Notable productions ==
- Staatstheater Stuttgart, Stuttgart (1973) — World premiere
- Traverse Theatre, Edinburgh (1974) — British premiere, starring Scottish actress Kay Gallie
- Women's Interart Center, New York City (1981) — American premiere, starring American actress Joan MacIntosh
- Cast Theatre, Los Angeles (1986) — Los Angeles production, starring American actress Salome Jens
- Fishman Space, New York City (2016) — New York City production, starring Polish actress Danuta Stenka
- Samsung Performing Arts Theatre, Makati (2024) — Philippine premiere, starring Filipino actresses Lea Salonga and Dolly de Leon in alternating performances

== Reception ==
Mel Gussow reviewed Request Concert positively in 1981, saying that because of the "clearsighted dramatic vision of Mr. Kroetz [...] the mundane is transformed into something close to hypnotic. [...] Through an accumulation of details and objects, we arrive at a point of complete empathy with the woman." In a 1986 performance starring Salome Jens, Dan Sullivan of Los Angeles Times wrote that "one becomes absorbed in the woman's little tasks and the meticulous way she goes about them. [...] Kroetz may not have meant to leave a loophole [with the ending], but it only enriches his play." Katie Mitchell has called it a "difficult, beautiful play." A writer noted in The Herald that in 2011, the play continued to enjoy a level of attention uncommon for works by German writers of Kroetz's generation.

Reviewing the 2016 BAM Fisher performance, Elisabeth Vincentelli of The New York Times said Request Concert (partly because of Danuta Stenka's performance) remains a work of "heart-wrenching power [...] Partly this has to do with the resilience of loneliness and boredom in our lives, despite our access to so-called social media." Reviewing the same performance, Paul David Young wrote, "Though she does not vocalize, Frau Rasch speaks on behalf of those voiceless souls in contemporary society who feel lost, purposeless, alone and unconnected. It is a political and very human voice." In a chapter of The Schaubühne Berlin under Thomas Ostermeier, Marvin Carlson referred to it as "powerful."

In review of the 2024 Philippine production, titled Request sa Radyo, starring Lea Salonga and Dolly de Leon in alternating performances, Celine Lagundi of Vogue Philippines wrote that the play "opens opportunities for important discourse about loneliness and isolation especially in the workplace, and the importance of mental wellness through community." Hannah Mallorca of the Inquirer wrote that the play is "not for everyone. [...] But it's a piece that commands attention through silence, and how its realistic moments—almost to the point of making the viewers question their sanity as well—remind the viewers that struggling with loneliness manifests through stillness."
