= Kat Evasco =

American artist

Kat Evasco is a queer Filipina American stand up comedian, performing artist, playwright, writer, and producer living in San Francisco, CA. She holds a BA in Asian American Studies from San Francisco State University.

== Works ==
Kat Evasco was the co-creator of the BAKLA SHOW I & II (2007, 2010), highlighting the experiences of the queer Filipino community. The show was named to reclaim the term bakla and to be inclusive of gay, lesbian, bisexual transgender and queer Filipino identities.

Evasco performed "Stories of Queer Diaspora", an independently run performance arts and literary series that celebrates how self-identified queer immigrant and 1st/2nd generation individuals unapologetically navigate their bodies, gender, culture, sexuality, and history at La Pena Cultural Center.

Evasco has been performing stand-up comedy since 2007. Some of her skits include her coming out story in 2014 and body image issues in 2009. She has performed at venues including Bindlestiff Studio, the Haha Cafe, San Jose Improv, the Purple Onion, Napa Valley Opera House, Logan Center for the Arts, Annenberg Center for the Performing Arts, and FringeArts.

Evasco is most well known for Mommy Queerest which was written by Kat Evasco and John Caldon and performed by Kat Evasco. This piece chronicles the coming out process of a lesbian daughter and a closeted lesbian mother, illustrating how the reclaiming of their sexuality challenges and strengthens their relationship. Mommy, Queerest contributes a voice that actively imparts the message of empowerment and inspires an intergenerational discourse among diverse communities. Kat's use of comedy invites the audience to laugh at the darkest human conditions, while providing a critical lens through which to analyze the detrimental effects of homophobia in our society. The play stems from the belief that silence enables homophobia and perpetuates cycles of abuse.

== Activism ==
Evasco has spoken on a number of issues such as immigration rights as it relates to the queer Asian, Southeast Asian and South Asian communities, gentrification in San Francisco and how it affects local Filipino artists as well as how surviving sexual abuse and incest can intersect with performance art

== Professional affiliations ==
- Artistic Director of Guerrilla Rep since November 2015
- Chief Dream Director of The Future Project since February 2015
- Production Manager of Youth Speaks Inc between September 2011 - December 2014

== Honors and awards ==
In October 2012, Evasco was the recipient of the Next Gen Arts Leadership grant from the Creative Capacity Fund and the Center for Cultural Innovation.
