= Carmina Escobar =

Mexican-American musician and artist (born 1981)

Carmina Escobar (born 1981) is an experimental vocalist, improviser, performance artist, multimedia artist, filmmaker, composer, and educator from Mexico City who lives and works in Los Angeles, California. Jeffrey Fleishman from the Los Angeles Times has written that Escobar "can make her voice sound like insects dancing on dry leaves or a rocket ship dying in space." She is on the VoiceArts faculty of the California Institute of the Arts where she teaches on "voice technique, experimental voice workshops, contemporary vocal music, and interdisciplinary projects regarding the voice".

== Education ==
Escobar studied music in the Escuela Superior de Música of the Instituto Nacional de Bellas Artes in Mexico City where she was trained through the classical canon, "but her soul and voice--she was labeled a soprano and mezzo-soprano--felt constricted by what she called music 'that's mostly male, mostly European.'" These constrictions led her to explore other possibilities of the voice, extended techniques being a prominent one, and to seek additional training from artists living in Mexico City such as Hebe Rosell and Juan Pablo Villa. In the United States and in other locales, Escobar continued her vocal experimentation techniques with additional training with Jaqueline Bobak, Meredith Monk, Jaap Blonk. She is a graduate of the MFA program in VoiceArts at the California Institute of the Arts.

== Notable work ==
Escobar has gained national and international recognition for her vocal, scenic, electronic music, and filmic work. In addition to performing in different festivals around the country and the world, Escobar has performed throughout Mexico, the United States, Cuba, and Puerto Rico, among other locations. Until the organization and community events space went defunct in 2018, her work was shown regularly with the Los Angeles based Machine Project. Some of Escobar's most recent work in Los Angeles has been produced by her production company, Boss Witch.

Escobar is also widely known for her body resonance work known as Massagem Sonora, which Fernando Vigueras has described as "a sort of exercise that analyses and reflects upon the body, understanding it as a space that reveals, measures and recognizes itself throughout its resonance." Massagem Sonora, or Sonic Massage, gained attention through its role in a large scale collaborative project in 2013 through the Getty Foundation's funded Pacific Standard Time Presents: Modern Architecture in L.A. and in tangent with The Machine Project Field Guide to LA Architecture.

Another piece initially produced by Machine Project was Escobar's large-scale site-specific performance spectacle Fiesta Perpetua! A Communitas Ritual of Manifestation in Los Angeles's Echo Park Lake on May 20, 2017, which was later re-staged as part of Pacific Standard Time Festival: Live Art LA/LA on January 13, 2018, funded by the Getty Foundation and organized by REDCAT. While the first iteration lasted all day, from dawn to dusk and moved, the second took place during one afternoon. Of Fiesta Perpetual! Yxta Maya Murray has said that Escobar "mesmerized a crowd of onlookers with a series of esoteric songs" as she was "accompanied by the 40-member Oaxacan youth brass band Maqueos Music, conducted by Yulissa Maqueos" and the Japanese butoh dancer Oguri. Inspired by traditional processional events in Mexico, Fiesta Perpetua! was conceived less of a spectacle to be taken in by the "onlookers" and more as a series of ritualized movements throughout the space where the audience became participants. Carolina A. Miranda called it, "a performance that felt a little bit like a stirring rite that transforms into an impromptu neighborhood party."

Escobar is the co-founder and was a long-term vocalist of LIMINAR, a contemporary music ensemble based in Mexico City. As noted by Alejandro Madrid in his book In Search of Julián Carrillo and Sonido 13, Escobar was instrumental in LIMINAR's performance of Julián Carrillo's Preludio a Colón, which is said to best exemplify Carrillo's microtonal music theory known as Sonido 13. Their first performance of the piece took place on July 4, 2013 in Mexico City. LIMINAR's United States' performance of this landmark piece, along with other Carrillo and Carrillo inspired compositions, took place in Los Angeles's REDCAT on December 11–12, 2015. Of Escobar's performance Mark Swed wrote: "the greatest novelty is heard in a soprano part that could be the soundtrack for a séance and was sung with startling expressivity and purity by Carmina Escobar."

In 2018 Escobar premiered her performance piece, Pura Entraña / Pure Gut, developed during her residency at MacDowell and in collaboration Mexican instrument maker and musician Jerónimo Naranjo who known for his Piano Suspendido (Suspended Piano). Escobar and her collaborators, which consisted of musicians, instrumentalists, and dancers—among them Naranjo, Dorian Wood, the Oaxacan youth brass band Maqueos Music, Oguri, Roxanne Steinberg—activated the installation of the Piano Suspendido that hovered 6 feet above Los Angeles' REDCAT's stage floor and created a surrealist sonic and visual journey into the entrails of the installation for the spectators.

Another project, Bajo la sombra del sol / Under the Sun's Shadow, a Boss Witch Production, premiered in 2021 also in REDCAT and it consisted of an immersive installation and film projection alongside live performance by an ensemble of artists from different disciplines: music, voice, dance. As described on the REDCAT's website, Bajo la sombra del sol "is a performative hypertextural scenic work by Carmina Escobar that is staged, makes communion with, and gathers multimedia material at the natural landscape of Mono Lake, California." This multimedia material gathered can be considered an experimental film that Escobar directed in Mono Lake under great duress, the Covid-19 pandemic and the fires that raged throughout California during the summer of 2021. But the locale of Mono Lake, which has been "relentlessly whittled into its current state of environmental calamity by humans," was used to explore one of Escobar's artistic and philosophical interests, the "concept of darkness, of the shadow, of inhabiting shadows and casting shadows." For Bajo la sombra del sol Escobar brought back two key collaborators, Jerónimo Naranjo who constructed a series of instruments, including a large-scale drum that stands as proxy for the sun, and Dorian Wood who is a central character in the piece, both the film and live version, alongside other past and new collaborating artists.

Part of The Industry Lab series, Escobar premiered Our Voice Is Not at the End of Anything at REDCAT in February of 2026, "a spiral-structured opera in gesture and sound whose staging reimagines voice as force, friction, and breath."

== Collaborations ==
Escobar has collaborated with several artists. Notably she worked with Raven Chacon on a series of scores For Zitkála-Šá. The Diné composer and multimedia artist created a score specifically with Escobar in mind, For Carmina Escobar, which she has performed on several occasions, including at the Whitney Museum during the 2022 Whitney Biennial where all 12 For Zitkála-Šá were on display. Of the Whitney Biennial performance Jennifer Pyron wrote for the Opera Wire that "Escobar's voice amassed every possible emotion in her live performance. Between screams, gasps, wails and glottal noise, Escobar stood like a terrifying statue on stage...Symbolizing the raw terror that lays beneath the surface, sometimes in the moment and out in the open. Carmina Escobar's performance was legendary."

Escobar and Chacon both worked in The Industry's Sweet Land, described by Mark Swed for the Los Angeles Times, "opera as astonishment," which premiered in The Los Angeles State Historic Park in February 2020. Chacon was part of the creative team, he was one of the composers, and Escobar played the role of one of the Coyotes, where she donned a costume designed and manufactured by Cannupa Hanska Luger, who also served as co-director, alongside Yuval Sharon. Among her notable contributions to Sweet Land, was her vocal improvisation, along with the other Coyote (Micaela Tobin) and the Wiindigo (Sharon Kim) over Chacon's electronic soundtrack in the section entitled "Crossroads."

Just as Escobar has invited Dorian Wood to be part of her pieces, Wood has also included Escobar among one of her most consistent collaborators. During Wood's homage to the late Costa Rican, nationalized Mexican Chavela Vargas, Xavela Lux Aeterna, the multimedia Los Angeles-based artist invited Escobar to improvise with her during the performance of the song medley "Diablo y Patriótica" at the REDCAT in Los Angeles in 2019. Wood's homage to Vargas was commissioned by the Festival Internacional de Arte Sacro in Madrid, which later also commissioned another homage, this time in honor of the late Canadian Latina Lhasa de Sela. Wood invited Escobar to be a collaborator and a co-performer of the piece, simply titled Lhasa and they toured in cities across Spain in 2022. The live performance was recorded in Teatro Jovellanos in Gijón. Most recently, Escobar has performed in Wood's Canto de Todes (Song for Everyone), a 12-hour performance installation that is composed of three parts, two live movements (I and III), and one long ten-hour immersive sound and visual installation (II). Escobar's contributions to Canto de Todes are part of the third movement.

The performance artist Ron Athey is another one of Escobar's collaborators, and together, along with other artists at times, they have performed in underground and in off-the fringes venues. But noteworthy is Escobar's participation in Athey's Gifts of the Spirit, co-directed by Athey and Sean Griffith who is also the composer of the piece. Gifts of the Spirit premiered on January 25, 2018 at Saint Vibiana, a deconsecrated cathedral in Los Angeles. In a review of the piece for Artforum, art critic and scholar Andy Campbell wrote of Escobar's performance: "I cannot adequately convey the things that came out of Escobar Alba's mouth—but they were tensile and tough, and became a vibrato that pushed not only through her lips but from her fingertips as well, which were often extended outward in mimicry of birdlike flight. This was whole-body singing, bringing the volume-enhancing acoustics of the church to heel as a massive amplifier."

== Pedagogy ==
Escobar has trained students in vocal techniques within the California Institute of the Arts and beyond. Additionally, she has conducted workshops across the globe on voice, body resonance, and site-specific performance. With Micaela Tobin, Escobar is one of the founders and workshop facilitators of Howl Space, "a community-based learning resource that reframes vocal pedagogy through holistic, process-based approaches to discover the multi-faceted possibilities of the voice and unveil the creative process." Howl Space is nestled in teaching about the voice's capacities through radical pedagogy, as Escobar told Yxta Maya Murray in an interview for Artillery Magazine, "A radical pedagogy of the voice investigates not only the physical mechanics of its production, but also its ancestral trace. In our pedagogy, Micaela and I seek to understand the voice's multiple possibilities by facilitating a space for its discovery and investigation. A radical pedagogy of the voice is also a tool to understand our world, to have agency in it, to express ourselves through art."

== Production ==
With Madeline Falcone, Escobar is the co-founder and co-director of Boss Witch Productions, "an artistic production company focused on the intersection of experimental sound art, ritual performance, video art, and transmedia collaboration with natural landscapes and unusual performance sites." Some of the projects that Boss Witch Productions has produced include Bajo la sombra del sol (2021-2022), Vox Clamantis (2021-2022), CalArts Gala at REDCAT (2022), among others.

== Film music composition ==
Carmina Escobar worked as the original music composer for Juan Pablo González's award-winning film Dos Estaciones (2022). The film has received a wide assortment of critical accolades, some which include its score. Sheri Linden for The Hollywood Reporter wrote that Escobar's work in the film is "essential," an "ethereal score" that "taps into the beauty at hand." While Matt Fagerholm for RogerEber.com praised Escobar by writing the following: "In the very few times that non-diegetic music is heard throughout the picture, composer Carmina Escobar creates a strikingly eerie mood akin to the György Ligeti selections in Kubrick's "2001: A Space Odyssey," particularly the whispering vocalists who accompany María's discreet visit to the factory of her American rivals."

== Grants and residencies ==
Escobar has been awarded several grants and residencies including the Performer's Grant by the National Endowment of the Arts in Mexico twice, the 2014 NFA Master Artist Grant, the MacDowell residency twice, in 2018 and 2024, the Foundation for Contemporary Arts in Music/Sound in 2020, the National Performance Network Creation Fund Award in 2020, the Bemis Center for Contemporary Arts residency in 2021, and the Creative Capital Award in 2026.

== Recordings and publications ==
- People's Historia, with Estamos Trio (Relative Pitch, 2013)
- TZATZI (A Wave Press, 2017)
- Dire Warning, with Estamos Trio (Relative Pitch, 2020)
- Feast of Beams, Keepers of Light, co-edited with Madison Heying and Laura Steenberge (Indexical, 2020)
