= Diana Gannett =

Diana Gannett is an American classical double bassist and educator, professor emeritus of Double Bass at the University of Michigan School of Music.

== Career ==
Previous appointments include the faculties of Yale University School of Music, Theatre & Dance and Hartt School of Music, Theatre & Dance in Connecticut, Oberlin College Conservatory in Ohio, University of Iowa School of Music, Theatre & Dance, and the University of South Florida.

For many years she held the position of principal double bass at Eastern Music Festival in Greensboro, North Carolina. Her students have been winners in many solo competitions (ISB, ASTA, EMF, Aspen, and various regional competitions) and have also won positions in professional orchestras and teaching institutions.

Gannett is a past president of the International Society of Bassists, founded by her former teacher, Gary Karr, and hosted its bi-annual convention at the University of Iowa in 1999.
