= Impact of the COVID-19 pandemic on the music industry =

The COVID-19 pandemic has had a significant impact on the music industry, mirroring its impacts across all arts sectors. Numerous music events, including music festivals, concert tours, and award shows, have been cancelled or postponed. While some musicians and composers were able to use the time to create new works, there were flow-on effects on the many supporting people who relied on performers for their income. Various album releases have been delayed as well. Pollstar estimated the total lost revenue for the live music industry in 2020 at more than $30 billion.

== Music events ==
Many concert tours, music festivals, and other events were canceled or postponed.

=== Impacted music festivals ===
Festival	Location	Details	Source
80/35 Music Festival	Western Gateway Park, Des Moines, Iowa, U.S.	2020 edition cancelled.	
Afro Nation Puerto Rico	Balneario de Carolina, Carolina, Puerto Rico	2020 edition cancelled.	
All Points East	Victoria Park, London, England	2020 edition cancelled.	
Asunciónico	Jockey Club, Asunción, Paraguay	Postponed until late 2020.	
Bassinthegrass	Darwin, Northern Territory, Australia	Rescheduled to May 15, 2021.	
BBC Radio 1's Big Weekend	Camperdown Park, Dundee, Scotland	2020 edition cancelled.	
Beale Street Music Festival	Tom Lee Park, Memphis, Tennessee, U.S.	Postponed. Rescheduled to October 16–18, 2020.	
Beyond Wonderland	NOS Events Center, San Bernardino, California, U.S.	2020 edition cancelled.	
Big Ears Festival	Knoxville, Tennessee, U.S.	2020 edition cancelled.	
Billboard LatinFest+	Las Vegas, Nevada, U.S.	2020 event cancelled. Winners announced online on May 18, 2020.	
Bonnaroo Music Festival	Great Stage Park, Manchester, Tennessee, U.S.	Rescheduled to September 24–27, 2020.	
Boomtown	Matterley Estate, Winchester, Hampshire, England	2020 edition cancelled.	
Boston Calling Music Festival	Harvard Athletic Complex, Boston, Massachusetts, U.S.	2020 edition cancelled.	
BottleRock Napa Valley	Napa Valley Expo, Napa, California, U.S.	Postponed. Rescheduled to October 2–4, 2020.	
The BPM Festival: Miami	The Lawn at Island Gardens, Miami, Florida, U.S.	Postponed until further notice.	
British Summer Time	Hyde Park, London, England	2020 edition cancelled.	
BUKU Music + Art Project Festival	Mardi Gras World, New Orleans, Louisiana, U.S.	2020 edition cancelled	
Bunbury Music Festival	Sawyer Point Park & Yeatman's Cove, Cincinnati, Ohio, U.S.	2020 edition cancelled.	
Burger Boogaloo	Mosswood Park, Oakland, California, U.S.	Rescheduled to October 31 to November 1, 2020.	
Byron Bay Bluesfest	Byron Bay, New South Wales, Australia	2020 edition cancelled.	
C2C: Country to Country	The O2 Arena, London, England and The SSE Hydro, Glasgow, Scotland; 3Arena, Dublin, Ireland	Postponed. Rescheduled to March 12–14, 2021.	
California Roots Music and Arts Festival	Monterey County Fairgrounds, Monterey, California, U.S.	Rescheduled to October 9–11, 2020.	
Calle Ocho Festival	Little Havana, Miami, Florida, U.S.	2020 edition cancelled.	
Cape Town International Jazz Festival	Cape Town, South Africa	2020 edition postponed for the foreseeable future.	
CMA Music Festival	Nashville, Tennessee, U.S.	2020 edition cancelled.	
CMC Rocks QLD	Willowbank Raceway, Ipswich, Queensland, Australia	2020 edition cancelled.	
Coachella Valley Music and Arts Festival	Empire Polo Club, Indio, California, U.S.	Initially rescheduled to October 9–11 and October 16–18, 2020, and later cancelled.	
Dark Mofo	Hobart, Tasmania, Australia	2020 edition cancelled.	
Download Festival Australia	Melbourne Showgrounds, Melbourne, Victoria and The Domain, Sydney, New South Wales, Australia	2020 event cancelled.	
Download Festival Japan	Chiba City and Osaka, Japan	Postponed until further notice.	
Download Festival UK	Donington Park, Derbyshire, England	Postponed. Rescheduled to June 4–6, 2021.	
Eden Festival	Raehills Meadows, Moffat, Dumfries and Galloway, Scotland	2020 edition cancelled	
Dreamville Festival	Dorothea Dix Park, Raleigh, North Carolina, U.S.	2020 edition cancelled.	
Electric Daisy Carnival	Las Vegas Motor Speedway, Las Vegas, Nevada, U.S.	Postponed. Rescheduled to October 2–4, 2020.	
Epicenter	Charlotte Motor Speedway, Concord, North Carolina, U.S.	2020 edition cancelled.	
Essence Music Festival	Mercedes-Benz Superdome, New Orleans, Louisiana, U.S.	2020 edition cancelled.	
Estéreo Picnic Festival	Bogotá, Colombia	Postponed. Rescheduled to December 4–6, 2020.	
Firefly Music Festival	The Woodlands of Dover International Speedway, Dover, Delaware, U.S.	2020 edition cancelled.	
Flow Festival	Suvilahti, Helsinki, Finland	2020 edition cancelled.	
Forecastle Festival	Louisville Waterfront Park, Louisville, Kentucky, U.S.	2020 edition cancelled.	
Gathering of the Juggalos	Nelson Kennedy Ledges State Park, Garrettsville, Ohio, U.S.	2020 edition cancelled.	
Glastonbury Festival	Pilton, Somerset, England	2020 and 2021 edition cancelled.	
Governors Ball Music Festival	Randalls Island, New York City, New York, U.S.	2020 edition cancelled.	
Hammersonic Festival	Carnaval Beach Ancol, Jakarta, Indonesia	Rescheduled to January 15–17, 2021.	
Hangout Music Festival	Gulf Shores, Alabama, U.S.	2020 edition cancelled.	
Isle of Wight Festival	Seaclose Park, Newport, Isle of Wight, England	2020 edition cancelled.	
Istanbul International Jazz Festival	Istanbul, Turkey	Postponed until further notice.	
Killin Music Festival	Killin, Scotland	Postponed to June 18–20, 2021.	
Knockengorroch	Galloway, Scotland	Postponed to September 10–13, 2020.	
Korea Times Music Festival	Hollywood Bowl, Los Angeles, California, U.S.	Postponed to October 23–25, 2020.	
La Linea – The London Latin Music Festival	London, England	Rescheduled to September 4–October 19, 2020.	
Life Is Beautiful Music & Art Festival	Downtown Las Vegas, Nevada, U.S.	2020 edition cancelled.	
Lightning in a Bottle	Buena Vista Lake, California, U.S.	2020 edition cancelled. Virtual festival	
Lockn' Festival	Oak Ridge Farm, Arrington, Virginia, U.S.	Rescheduled to October 1–3, 2021.	
Lollapalooza Argentina	Hipódromo de San Isidro, Buenos Aires, Argentina	Rescheduled to November 27–29, 2020.	
Lollapalooza Brazil	Autódromo de Interlagos, São Paulo, Brazil	Rescheduled to December 4–6, 2020.	
Lollapalooza Chile	O'Higgins Park, Santiago, Chile	Rescheduled to November 27–29, 2020.	
Longitude Festival	Marlay Park, Dublin, Ireland	2020 edition cancelled.	
Lowlands	Biddinghuizen, Netherlands	2020 edition cancelled.	
Lost & Found Festival	St. Paul's Bay, Malta	2020 edition cancelled	
March Madness Music Festival	Centennial Olympic Park, Atlanta, Georgia, U.S.	Music festival coinciding with the 2020 NCAA Division I men's basketball tournament cancelled following the tournament's cancellation.	
Mawazine	Rabat, Morocco	2020 edition cancelled.	
Melbourne Jazz Festival	Melbourne, Victoria, Australia	2020 edition cancelled.	
Meltdown Festival	Southbank Centre, London, England	2020 edition cancelled.	
Mission Creek Festival	Englert Theatre, Iowa City, Iowa, U.S.	2020 edition cancelled.	
Montreal Jazz Festival	Montreal, Quebec, Canada	2020 edition cancelled.	
Montreux Jazz Festival	Montreux, Switzerland	2020 edition cancelled.	
Mountain Jam	Bethel Woods Center for the Arts, Bethel, New York, U.S.	2020 edition cancelled.	
Movement Electronic Music Festival	Philip A. Hart Plaza, Detroit, Michigan, U.S.	Postponed. Rescheduled to September 11–13, 2020.	
MusicNOW Festival	Cincinnati, Ohio, U.S.	2020 edition cancelled.	
New Orleans Jazz & Heritage Festival	New Orleans, Louisiana, U.S.	2020 edition canceled.	
Newport Folk Festival	Fort Adams State Park, Newport, Rhode Island, U.S.	2020 edition canceled.	
Newport Jazz Festival	Fort Adams State Park, Newport, Rhode Island, U.S.	2020 edition canceled.	
Ojai Music Festival	Ojai, California, U.S.	2020 edition cancelled.	
Oslo Sommertid	Bjølsenfeltet, Oslo, Norway	2020 edition cancelled.	
Ottawa Jazz Festival	Ottawa, Ontario, Canada	2020 edition cancelled.	
Pal Norte	Fundidora Park, Monterrey, Nuevo León, Mexico	2020 edition cancelled.	
Parklife Festival	Heaton Park, Manchester, England	2020 edition cancelled.	
Primavera Sound Barcelona	Parc del Fòrum, Barcelona, Catalonia, Spain	2020 edition cancelled.	
Primavera Sound Porto	Parque da Cidade, Porto, Portugal	2020 edition cancelled.	
Pulp Summer Slam	Mall of Asia Arena, Bay City, Pasay, Philippines	2020 edition cancelled.	
Rakrakan Festival	CCP Open Grounds, Pasay, Philippines	Originally rescheduled to April 25, 2020, and then postponed until further notice.	
Rock am Ring	Nürburgring, Nürburg, Rhineland-Palatinate, Germany	2020 edition cancelled.	
Rock im Park	Zeppelinfeld, Nuremberg, Bavaria, Germany	2020 edition cancelled.	
Rock in Rio	Bela Vista Park, Lisbon, Portugal	Rescheduled to June 19–20 and June 26–27, 2021	
Rock the Ocean's Tortuga Music Festival	Fort Lauderdale Beach Park, Fort Lauderdale, Florida, U.S.	Rescheduled to October 2–4, 2020	
Rock Werchter	Festivalpark, Werchter, Belgium	2020 edition cancelled.	
Roskilde Festival	Roskilde, Denmark	2020 edition cancelled.	
Shambhala	Salmo, British Columbia, Canada	2020 edition cancelled.	
Snowbombing	Mayrhofen, Tyrol, Austria	2020 edition cancelled.	
Sónar Hong Kong	Hong Kong Science Park, Tai Po, New Territories, Hong Kong	Postponed until further notice.	
South by Southwest	Austin, Texas, U.S.	2020 edition cancelled.	
Splendour in the Grass	North Byron Parklands, Yelgun, New South Wales, Australia	Rescheduled to October 23–25, 2020.	
Stagecoach Festival	Empire Polo Club, Indio, California, U.S.	Initially rescheduled to October 23–25, 2020, and later cancelled.	
Summerfest	Henry Maier Festival Park, Milwaukee, Wisconsin, U.S.	Rescheduled to September 3–5, 10–12, and 17–19, 2020, then cancelled.	
SunFest	West Palm Beach, Florida, U.S.	2020 edition cancelled.	
Tallinn Music Week	Tallinn, Estonia	Rescheduled to August 2020.	
Texas Music Revolution	Amphitheater at Oak Point Park, Plano, Texas, U.S.	Postponed. Rescheduled to July 31 and August 1, 2020.	
Tomorrowland	Boom, Antwerp, Belgium	2020 edition cancelled.	
Tomorrowland Winter	Alpe d'Huez, France	2020 edition cancelled.	
Towersey Festival	Thame, Oxfordshire, England	2020 edition cancelled.	
Treefort Music Fest	Boise, Idaho, U.S.	Postponed. Rescheduled to September 23–27, 2020.	
Ultra Music Festival	Bayfront Park, Miami, Florida, U.S.	2020 edition cancelled.	
Ultra Abu Dhabi	Du Arena, Abu Dhabi, United Arab Emirates	2020 edition cancelled.	
Wacken Open Air	Wacken, Schleswig-Holstein, Germany	2020 edition cancelled.	
Wanderland Music and Arts Festival	Filinvest City Event Grounds, Muntinlupa, Philippines	Postponed until further notice.	
Waterfront Blues Festival	Tom McCall Waterfront Park, Portland, Oregon, U.S.	2020 edition cancelled.	
Welcome to Rockville	Daytona International Speedway, Daytona Beach, Florida, U.S.	2020 edition cancelled.	
WOMAD Charlton Park	Charlton Park, Malmesbury, Wiltshire, England	2020 edition cancelled.	
WOO HAH!	Safaripark Beekse Bergen, Hilvarenbeek, Netherlands	Rescheduled to July 9–11, 2021.	

=== Impacted music conferences ===
Name	Location	Details	Source
ASCAP Experience	InterContinental Los Angeles Downtown, Los Angeles, California, U.S.	2020 edition cancelled.	
FastForward	Studios 301, Sydney, New South Wales, Australia	2020 edition cancelled.	
International Music Summit	Ibiza, Balearic Islands, Spain	Postponed until further notice. Virtual version of the event will take place.	
Midem	Palais des Festivals et des Congrès, Cannes, France	2020 edition moved online.	
Music Biz 2020	JW Marriott Nashville, Nashville, Tennessee, U.S.	Postponed. Rescheduled to August 16–19, 2020.	
Winter Music Conference	Miami, Florida, U.S.	Postponed until further notice.	

=== Impacted concert performances ===
Artist	Venue	Details	Source
Bad Bunny	Hiram Bithorn Stadium, San Juan, Puerto Rico	Rescheduled to October 30 and 31, 2020.	
Car Seat Headrest	Massachusetts Museum of Contemporary Art, North Adams, Massachusetts, U.S.	Rescheduled to September 4, 2020.	
Charli XCX	El Plaza Condesa, Mexico City, Mexico	Rescheduled to October 21, 2020.	
Chris Tomlin	Bridgestone Arena, Nashville, Tennessee, U.S.	Tomlin's annual "Good Friday Nashville" concert postponed.	
Ciara	USO Fort Hood, Killeen, Texas, U.S.	Postponed until further notice.	
Glass Animals	Neumos, Seattle, Washington, U.S.	Concert cancelled.	
Josh Groban	Radio City Music Hall, New York City, New York, U.S.	Groban's "Great Big Radio City Show" postponed to October 5, 2020.	
Juanes	Movistar Arena, Bogotá, Colombia	Juanes' "Para Todos" show postponed until further notice.	
Liam Gallagher	Heaton Park, Manchester, England	Concert cancelled.	
Mariah Carey	Neal S. Blaisdell Center, Honolulu, Hawaii, U.S.	Postponed to November 28, 2020.	

=== Impacted concert tours ===
Tour	Artist	Details	Source
11:11 World Tour	Maluma	Select dates of the European leg postponed until further notice.	
20th Anniversary Tour	Murder by Death	All spring dates postponed until further notice.	
2020 Tour	Against Me!	Spring tour dates and summer co-headlining tour with Baroness both canceled.	
2020 Tour	Bon Jovi	Tour cancelled.	
2020 Tour	Bhad Bhabie	Tour cancelled.	
2020 Tour	Dev Hynes	North American shows postponed.	
2020 Tour	Disclosure	European shows postponed.	
2020 Tour	Iggy Pop	Shows in Montpellier and Besançon cancelled. Shows in Monaco, Marseille, Lyon, Strasbourg, and Nantes rescheduled to September 2020.	
2020 Tour	Maroon 5	Final two shows of the South American leg and all shows in the North American leg have been rescheduled to both from the 2021 Tour and the World Tour 2022, respectively. Maroon 5 had already concluded nine shows in South America.	
2020 Tour	Matchbox Twenty	Tour cancelled, with the rescheduled dates will be billed as the 2021 Tour.	
2020 Tour	The National	North American shows postponed.	
2020 Tour	Tones and I	European shows postponed until further notice. Australian shows rescheduled to September 2020.	
2020 Tour	Pixies	Shows in Brisbane, Sydney, and Perth postponed until further notice.	
2020 Tour	Umphrey's McGee	Various dates, including spring concerts in California, Indiana, and Missouri were postponed to the fall. The band's Rockjavik event in Iceland was also postponed.	
2020 Tour	Lea Salonga	Shortly after performing in Dubai, the North American tour was postponed, then again postponed to Fall 2021, and finally to Spring 2022. The postponed tour was later renamed The Dream Again Tour and a UK leg was added.	
2020 Monsta X World Tour	Monsta X	North American leg postponed until further notice.	
2020 North American Tour	Mandy Moore	Tour cancelled.	
2021 Tour	Matchbox Twenty	This tour was previously announced as the 2020 Tour is cancelled, with dates have now been moved to 2022.	
2022 Tour	Matchbox Twenty	This tour was previously announced as the 2020 Tour and 2021 Tour is cancelled, with dates has now been moved to 2023.	
2022 UK & Ireland Tour	Sigrid	Tour rescheduled to November 2022.	
30th Anniversary Tour	Béla Fleck and the Flecktones	All March and April concerts postponed.	
30th Anniversary Tour	The House of Love	All dates postponed.	
American Standard Tour	James Taylor and Jackson Browne	All summer dates postponed	
April/May Van Tour 2020	Foo Fighters	Postponed to October 2020, then cancelled.	
The Awards Tour	NCT 127	All North American shows canceled.	
The (Arena) Tour	Dan + Shay	March and April shows postponed. Rescheduled to July, August, September, and October 2020. The duo had already concluded three shows with two in Nashville and one in Columbus.	
Australia! 2020 Tour – Back	Tim Minchin	Shows in Sydney, Newcastle, Melbourne and Brisbane postponed.	
Brightest Blue Tour	Ellie Goulding	Tour rescheduled to October 2021.	
Burn the Ships World Tour	For King & Country	Canadian dates postponed and were eventually cancelled. The band visited a number of stops in 2023 as part of their What Are We Waiting For Tour.	
Chillaxification Tour	Kenny Chesney	First 11 shows in the United States postponed.	
Chris Stapleton's All-American Road Show Tour	Chris Stapleton	Show in Birmingham, Alabama cancelled. Shows in Biloxi, Austin, and Arlington rescheduled to September 2020.	
The Chromatica Ball	Lady Gaga	Tour dates postponed until 2021.	
The Confetti Tour	Little Mix	UK dates postponed until 2022.	
Courage World Tour	Celine Dion	March and April shows of the North American leg postponed until further notice.	
Dave & Kris Go to Europe: Acoustic Tour 2020	David Cook and Kris Allen	Tour cancelled, with the rescheduled dates rescheduled to August 2020 and the tour will be billed as Dave & Kris Go to Europe: Take 2.	
The Dedicated Tour	Carly Rae Jepsen	North American leg cancelled.	
Dinah Jane World Tour	Dinah Jane	Tour postponed.	
D.R.E.A.M. The Tour	JoJo Siwa	North American leg postponed twice from 2020 and 2021, with the rescheduled dates in 2022.	
End of the Road World Tour	Kiss	Europe and United States legs postponed to summer and fall 2021.	
An Evening with Michael Bublé	Michael Bublé	Half of the North American leg postponed until further notice.	
Farewell Yellow Brick Road	Elton John	19 North American concerts rescheduled to 2021.	
Flood 30th Anniversary Tour	They Might Be Giants	March and April dates postponed.	
Free Spirit World Tour	Khalid	Asian leg postponed until further notice.	
Free Time World Tour	Ruel	Asian leg postponed until further notice.	
Friends and Heroes Tour	Blake Shelton	Final two weekend shows postponed until Spring 2021.	
Future Nostalgia Tour	Dua Lipa	All shows rescheduled to January 2021. Copenhagen, Stockholm, and Oslo shows cancelled. Vienna and Munich shows postponed until further notice.	
Gigaton Tour	Pearl Jam	North American leg postponed until further notice.	
Good to Know Tour	JoJo	Postponed in 2020 for dates in 2021, but later canceled entirely in January 2021.	
The Great Bambino Tour 2020	Action Bronson	Postponed until further notice.	
Guns N' Roses 2020 Tour	Guns N' Roses	Latin American leg rescheduled to November 2020.	
Head Above Water Tour	Avril Lavigne	European and Asian legs postponed until further notice.	
Heavy Is The Head Tour	Stormzy	Show in Zürich and Asian leg cancelled.	
Heavy Love Tour	Louise	Remaining dates of the tour was postponed. Louise had already concluded 4 shows with her tour.	
Hella Mega Tour	Green Day, Fall Out Boy, and Weezer	Asian leg postponed until further notice.	
Here We Go Again Tour	Cher	North American spring dates rescheduled to fall 2020	
High Road Tour	Kesha	All shows postponed albeit later cancelled in May 2020.	
Hotel California 2020 Tour	Eagles	All shows postponed and rescheduled to fall 2020.	
Hot Pink Tour	Doja Cat	All shows postponed.	
Human. :II: Nature. World Tour	Nightwish	All shows postponed. European shows rescheduled to May and June 2021, North American shows rescheduled to October 2021.	
I Disagree Tour	Poppy	Eurasia dates postponed, later canceled in March 2021.	
I, I Tour	Bon Iver	European leg postponed. Rescheduled to January 2021.	
Ich hasse Kinder Tour	Lindemann	European leg postponed. Rescheduled to November 2022, then 2023.	
I-Land: Who Am I	(G)I-dle	All shows canceled.	
The Jesus and Mary Chain Play Darklands	The Jesus and Mary Chain	European spring tour canceled, three UK dates rescheduled to 2021.	
JoJo Tour 2022	JoJo	3 dates of the North American leg was cancelled due to COVID-19 capacity restrictions.	
Justice World Tour	Justin Bieber	All shows are postponed until further notice.	
K-12 Tour	Melanie Martinez	North American summer dates postponed until further notice. Martinez had already concluded 48 shows with her tour.	
Kamaitachi Tour 2020	Kyary Pamyu Pamyu	All shows canceled.	
Kenny G Concert	Kenny G	Rescheduled show in Genting Highlands, Malaysia supposedly held in October 2020 was later cancelled and a 2021 edition of the concert was planned for the second quarter of 2021, while shows in Florida and Singapore postponed until further notice.	
The Last Domino? Tour	Genesis	Tour postponed. Rescheduled to April 2021.	
Louis Tomlinson World Tour	Louis Tomlinson	Show in Milan, Italy, cancelled. Shows in Ukraine, Russia, Asia, Oceania, and Latin America postponed until further notice.	
Love On Tour	Harry Styles	European leg postponed. Rescheduled to February 2021.	
Lover Fest	Taylor Swift	Postponed in 2020 for dates in 2021, but later canceled entirely in February 2021.	
Madame X Tour	Madonna	Final two shows in Paris, France, cancelled.	
Map of the Soul Tour	BTS	Entire tour cancelled. An alternative event, BTS Map of the Soul ON:E, was held online and took place on October 10 and 11, 2020.	
Mind Hive Tour	Wire	All spring European and North American dates postponed.	
Miraculous 2020 World Tour	Santana	All shows postponed.	
Moving On! Tour	The Who	United Kingdom and Ireland shows postponed. Rescheduled to March 2021.	
Miss Lauryn Hill Live in Concert	Lauryn Hill	Show in Upper Darby Township, Pennsylvania postponed until further notice. Show in Northfield, Ohio rescheduled to September 9, 2020.	
Music for Cars	The 1975	North American leg in 2020 postponed for dates in 2021, but later cancelled entirely in January 2021. The 1975 had already concluded 149 shows for their tour.	
My Chemical Romance Reunion Tour	My Chemical Romance	Oceania and Japan legs postponed until further notice. European and North American legs rescheduled to summer and fall 2021.	
Neon Future IV: The Color of Noise Tour	Steve Aoki	All shows postponed.	
Never Ending Tour 2020	Bob Dylan	Shows in Japan cancelled.	
Nice To Meet Ya Tour	Niall Horan	All shows cancelled.	
The Nightfall Tour	Little Big Town	All shows postponed. Rescheduled to August 2020.	
No Filter Tour	The Rolling Stones	Second North American leg postponed until September 2021, six shows cancelled.	
No Shame Tour	5 Seconds of Summer	All shows rescheduled to March 2021. Seven Europe leg shows and two North American shows cancelled.	
North American Tour	Tool	All spring 2020 tour dates postponed.	
Ocean 2020 Tour	Lady Antebellum / Lady A	Tour cancelled.	
Ode to Joy Tour	Wilco	Shows in Calgary, Missoula, Salt Lake City, Seattle, Vancouver, Portland, Las Vegas, and California postponed until further notice.	
Ol' Black Eyes Is Back: Alice Cooper	Alice Cooper	Spring 2020 North American leg postponed until further notice.	
The Old Friends Acoustic Tour	Ben Rector	The concert began in November 2019, and most shows were cancelled by August 2020.	
One More Haim Tour	Haim	All European tour dates postponed	
OneRepublic: Live in Concert	OneRepublic	2020 European leg rescheduled to 2021, then 2022.	
The Owl Tour	Zac Brown Band	All shows cancelled.	
Pentatonix: The World Tour	Pentatonix	European leg postponed until further notice.	
Perfume 8th Tour 2020 "P Cubed" in Dome	Perfume	Final show in Tokyo Dome on February 26, 2020, cancelled.	
Phoenix World Tour	Rita Ora	Remaining dates of the tour were cancelled and some were postponed until 2021. Ora had already concluded 50 shows with her tour.	
Public Service Announcement Tour	Rage Against the Machine	First half of its North American leg postponed until further notice.	
Rammstein Stadium Tour	Rammstein	The North American and European legs have been postponed until 2021.	
Reverie Tour	Ben Platt	North American leg postponed. Rescheduled to September 2022.	
The Rhapsody Tour	Queen + Adam Lambert	European leg postponed. Rescheduled to May 2022.	
Roar With The Lions Tour	Zac Brown Band	All shows cancelled.	
The Romance Tour	Camila Cabello	All shows are postponed until further notice.	
Runaway Tour	Post Malone	Some shows are cancelled and remaining dates postponed until further notice.	
Saint Cloud Tour	Waxahatchee	All April and May dates postponed and are to be rescheduled for later in 2020.	
Screamer Part 2 Tour	Third Eye Blind	Rescheduled to May 2020.	
Sling Tour	Clairo	Tour postponed.	
Summer Tour 2020	Dave Matthews Band	All shows were rescheduled for Summer Tour 2021.	
Summer Tour 2020	Dead & Company	All shows cancelled	
Summer Tour 2020	Little Mix	Tour cancelled	
Summer Tour 2020	Phish	All shows postponed until summer 2021	
Summer Tour 2020	Trey Anastasio Band	All shows cancelled; Anastasio and his band held an eight-week residency in the empty Beacon Theatre in fall 2020, which was livestreamed on Twitch.	
Sunshine Kitty Tour	Tove Lo	Final eight shows of her European leg postponed.	
SuperM: We Are the Future Live	SuperM	The show in Tokyo Dome on April 23, 2020, postponed.	
This Is Not a Drill Tour	Roger Waters	All North American dates postponed	
Three. Two. One.: The Tour	Lennon Stella	Tour cancelled.	
Time to Shine Tour	Ally Brooke	Tour cancelled.	
Tomorrow's Modern Boxes Tour	Thom Yorke	North American leg postponed.	
Tour for You	Tinashe	Tour cancelled.	
Twicelights World Tour	Twice	Seoul and Tokyo shows cancelled.	
Unfinished Business	The Pussycat Dolls	Entire tour cancelled.	
The Us Tour	Laura Marano	Tour postponed to August 2022.	
The Velvet Tour	Adam Lambert	European leg postponed until further notice.	
We Don't Need This Fascist Groove Thang! Tour	Heaven 17	All dates postponed, including the band's first-ever North American concerts.	
We Paint Electric Rhythm Colour Tour	King Crimson	All dates postponed until 2021.	
Where Do We Go? World Tour	Billie Eilish	Eilish had already concluded three shows in the North American leg. Rest of the tour cancelled and plans to move for a followup tour.	
Wildcard Tour	Miranda Lambert	Remaining dates postponed until October 2020.	
Winter Tour 2020	Moe	Remainder of tour canceled, The band's Snoedown festival postponed until 2021.	
Wonder: The World Tour	Shawn Mendes	European leg postponed from 2022 to 2023. Later, Mendes cancelled the entire tour due to his mental health.	
Worlds Collide Tour	Evanescence and Within Temptation	Tour postponed. First rescheduled to September 2020, then rescheduled again for September 2021, and a third time for April 2022.	
WorldWired Tour	Metallica	South American dates rescheduled from April to December.	

=== Impacted concert residencies ===
Title	Artist	Venue	Details	Source
David Lee Roth Rocks Vegas!	David Lee Roth	House of Blues Las Vegas	Last six shows postponed.	
Diana Ross	Diana Ross	Encore Theater	Postponed until further notice.	
Gwen Stefani – Just a Girl	Gwen Stefani	Zappos Theater	Final leg cancelled	
Jonas Brothers in Vegas	Jonas Brothers	Park Theater	All shows cancelled.	
Kelly Clarkson: Invincible	Kelly Clarkson	Zappos Theater	All shows from April to July 2020 cancelled.	
Lady Gaga Enigma	Lady Gaga	Park Theater	First six shows of the fifth run were cancelled	
Let's Go!	Shania Twain	Zappos Theater	All shows from March 18 to December 2020 were cancelled	
Lionel Richie – Las Vegas	Lionel Richie	Encore Theater	Postponed until further notice.	
Robbie Williams Live in Las Vegas	Robbie Williams	Encore Theater	Shows from March 24 to April 4, 2020, postponed.	
Together in Vegas	Reba McEntire and Brooks & Dunn	The Colosseum at Caesars Palace	Postponed until June 2020.	
ZZ Top: Viva Las Vegas	ZZ Top	The Venetian Theatre	Postponed until further notice.	
Weekends with Adele	Adele	The Colosseum at Caesars Palace	2022 residency postponed.	

=== Impacted benefit concerts ===
Name	Headliners	Venue	Details	Source
Bans Off My Body	Courtney Love and Melissa Auf der Maur	The Town Hall, New York City, New York, U.S.	Benefit concert promoting gender equality and access to sexual and reproductive health care cancelled.	
Farm Aid	Dave Matthews, John Mellencamp, Willie Nelson with Lukas and Micah Nelson, and Neil Young	Various locations	Converted to a series of home shows that were broadcast as "At Home with Farm Aid"	
Teenage Cancer Trust Concert	The Who and Mumford & Sons	Royal Albert Hall, London, England	Postponed until further notice.	
World Tour Bushfire Relief	Miley Cyrus and Robbie Williams	Lakeside Stadium, Melbourne, Victoria, Australia	Benefit concert raising funds for those affected by the 2019-20 Australian bushfire season cancelled after headliner Miley Cyrus withdrew of the event.	

=== Impacted award ceremonies and song contests ===
Event	Details	Source
55th Academy of Country Music Awards	Postponed to September 16, 2020. A television special, titled ACM Presents: Our Country, was aired in place of the ceremony's original April 5, 2020, timeslot on CBS.	
APRA Music Awards of 2020	Rescheduled to May 26, 2020, and was presented as a streaming "virtual" event.	
2020 BET Awards	Presented as a streaming "virtual" event.	
2020 Billboard Music Awards	Postponed to October 14, 2020.	
2020 Billboard Latin Music Awards	Postponed to October 27, 2020.	
15th Canadian Folk Music Awards	Ceremony cancelled. Winners announced on live stream on April 4	
18th Chopin Competition	Postponed to 2021	
Dansk Melodi Grand Prix 2020	Event was pushed through, though no live audience was admitted inside the venue, the Royal Arena in Copenhagen.	
29th Detroit Music Awards	Live show suspended. An online streaming event was held in place of the ceremony.	
Eurovision Song Contest 2020	Competition cancelled, marking the first time that the contest was not held since it began in 1956. A live television program, titled Eurovision: Europe Shine a Light, was broadcast in place of the show's grand final on May 16, 2020.	
Eurovision Young Musicians 2020	Competition cancelled.	
26th Fryderyk Awards	Ceremony cancelled. Originally, the ceremony was planned to take place without an audience, but it was scrapped. Instead, the winners were announced online.	
63rd Annual Grammy Awards	Rescheduled to March 14, 2021, following a surge in infections in Los Angeles County.	
2020 iHeartRadio Music Awards	Ceremony cancelled for the first time since the iteration of the event. Winners were revealed on September 4–7, 2020. A charity event, titled iHeart Living Room Concert for America, was aired in place of half of the ceremony's original March 29, 2020, timeslot on Fox.	
Juno Awards of 2020	Ceremony cancelled and was changed to virtual winner reveal, rescheduled to June 29, 2020. It was the first time the Juno Awards was cancelled since 1988.	
Rock and Roll Hall of Fame induction ceremony	Rescheduled to November 7, 2020. A television special, titled The Rock & Roll Hall of Fame 2020 Inductions, was aired in place of the ceremony on HBO.	
Songwriters Hall of Fame induction ceremony	Rescheduled to June 10, 2021.	

== Music releases ==
Several musical artists delayed the releases of albums amid the pandemic. The Record Store Day, which would have seen the release of several re-issues and exclusive material, was rescheduled from April 18 to June 20. But added with 3 dates: August 29, September 26, and October 24. In contrast, some musical acts, such as Dua Lipa, Sufjan Stevens, and Laura Marling, moved up the release dates of their upcoming albums. Others, such as Taylor Swift, Nine Inch Nails, Phish, X, and Fiona Apple, released new albums with little or no advanced notice. Swift intended to release her 2019 song "Cruel Summer" as a single in early 2020, but the outbreak of the pandemic disrupted her plans.

Many albums have had release dates pushed back as a result of the pandemic, including:

Impacted album releases
Artist	Album title	Original date	Rescheduled date	Source
Bonnie Tyler	The Best Is Yet to Come	March 2020	February 26, 2021	
The 1975	Notes on a Conditional Form	April 24, 2020	May 22, 2020	
Biffy Clyro	A Celebration of Endings	May 15, 2020	August 14, 2020	
Luke Bryan	Born Here Live Here Die Here	April 24, 2020	August 7, 2020	
Carach Angren	Franckensteina Strataemontanus	May 29, 2020	June 26, 2020	
Deep Purple	Whoosh!	June 12, 2020	August 7, 2020	
Dixie Chicks / The Chicks	Gaslighter	May 1, 2020	July 17, 2020	
DMA's	The Glow	April 24, 2020	July 10, 2020	
Jarv Is	Beyond the Pale	May 1, 2020	July 17, 2020	
Liam Gallagher	MTV Unplugged	April 24, 2020	June 12, 2020	
Ellie Goulding	Brightest Blue	June 5, 2020	July 17, 2020	
Coheed and Cambria	Vaxis – Act II: A Window of the Waking Mind	May 27, 2022	June 24, 2022	
Haim	Women in Music Pt. III	April 24, 2020	June 26, 2020	
Hinds	The Prettiest Curse	April 3, 2020	June 5, 2020	
Adele	30	September 2020	November 19, 2021	
Alicia Keys	Alicia	March 20, 2020	September 18, 2020	
Miley Cyrus	Plastic Hearts	2020	November 27, 2020	
The Killers	Imploding the Mirage	May 29, 2020	August 21, 2020	
Sugababes	One Touch: 20th Year Anniversary Edition	2020	October 1, 2021	
Hans Zimmer	No Time to Die	March 27, 2020	October 1, 2021	
Kanye West	Donda (then titled God's Country)	July 24, 2020	August 29, 2021	
Lady Gaga	Chromatica	April 10, 2020	May 29, 2020	
Demi Lovato	Dancing with the Devil... the Art of Starting Over	2020	April 2, 2021	
Bettye LaVette	Blackbirds	May 8, 2020	August 28, 2020	
The Lemon Twigs	Songs for the General Public	May 1, 2020	August 21, 2020	
Declan McKenna	Zeros	May 15, 2020	September 4, 2020	
Alanis Morissette	Such Pretty Forks in the Road	May 1, 2020	July 31, 2020	
Willie Nelson	First Rose of Spring	April 24, 2020	July 3, 2020	
Nick Mason's Saucerful of Secrets	Live at the Roundhouse	April 17, 2020	September 18, 2020	
The Sounds	Things We Do for Love	May 1, 2020	June 12, 2020	
The Pretenders	Hate for Sale	May 1, 2020	July 17, 2020	
Matt Berninger	Serpentine Prison	October 2, 2020	October 16, 2020	
I Dont Know How but They Found Me	Razzmatazz	October 16, 2020	October 23, 2020	
Margo Price	That's How Rumors Get Started	May 8, 2020	July 10, 2020	
Protomartyr	Ultimate Success Today	May 29, 2020	July 17, 2020	
The Psychedelic Furs	Made of Rain	May 1, 2020	July 31, 2020	
Sam Smith	Love Goes (then titled To Die For)	May 1, 2020	October 30, 2020	
Steven Wilson	The Future Bites	June 12, 2020	January 29, 2021	
Throwing Muses	Sun Racket	May 22, 2020	September 4, 2020	
Rufus Wainwright	Unfollow the Rules	April 24, 2020	July 10, 2020	
Rumer	Nashville Tears	May 2020	August 14, 2020	
Phantom Planet	Devastator	May 8, 2020	June 18, 2020	
Weezer	Van Weezer	May 15, 2020	May 7, 2021	
Bon Jovi	2020	May 15, 2020	October 2, 2020	
OneRepublic	Human	May 1, 2020	August 27, 2021	
Billy Ocean	One World	April 17, 2020	September 4, 2020	
Yungblud	Weird!	November 13, 2020	December 4, 2020	
Lana Del Rey	Chemtrails over the Country Club	September 5, 2020	March 19, 2021	
Zella Day	Sunday in Heaven	2021	October 14, 2022	
Ben Rector	The Joy of Music	2020	March 11, 2022	

== Virtual performances ==
Many artists elected to stream performances online. Virtual concerts, such as the iHeart Living Room Concert for America and Together at Home, were organised to provide entertainment to the public, and to raise awareness methods to combat the virus, notably social distancing. Artists such as Christine and the Queens, Ben Gibbard, and Katharine McPhee broadcast daily livestream performances from their homes. Several major bands including Pink Floyd, Radiohead, and Metallica offered free livestreams of archival concerts, as did several in the jam band scene, including Phish, Dead & Company, Widespread Panic, and The String Cheese Incident.

In April 2020, Beyond Live, the first paid concert streaming service in the world which provides full-scaled live online concert aided by technology – including augmented reality and real-time interactions between artists and live audience – was launched to deliver K-pop concerts. Since its creation, multiple K-pop artists have delivered full-length live concerts via this platform, and other K-pop entertainment enterprises started to produce virtual live concerts in similar format throughout 2020.

On May 27, 2020, WEBTVASIA in collaboration with Youtube and UNICEF, brought together various Asian musical artists and YouTubers to perform a virtual concert titled "One Love Asia" in an effort to display global unity against the coronavirus pandemic. The event, promoted by UNICEF, would donate all proceeds to support the mission and raise awareness of the organization.

In August 2020, the American singer Bilal live streamed his three-day remote recording of an experimental three-song EP titled VOYAGE-19. Spanning 54 hours, he wrote, recorded, and produce one song per day in virtual collaborations with producer Tariq Khan and 30 other musicians, including Erykah Badu, Robert Glasper, Keyon Harrold, Marcus Strickland, Raymond Angry, Ben Williams, Brandee Younger, and Marcus Gilmore. The stream simultaneously showed the EP's artwork being made, with a group of three visual artists enlisted for each song, including Angelbert Metoyer. Proceeds from the sale of the broadcast's pre-order and the EP's digital download were distributed among the participants, a number of whom were struggling financially due to the pandemic.

In November 2020, Taylor Swift released a concert film, titled Folklore: The Long Pond Studio Sessions, to Disney+. The film saw Swift, Aaron Dessner and Jack Antonoff quarantine themselves in an isolated recording studio and perform live every song from her eighth studio album, Folklore (2020). In September 2021, Billie Eilish similarly released a concert film to Disney+, titled Happier Than Ever: A Love Letter to Los Angeles, where she performed live every song from her second studio album Happier Than Ever (2021) at an empty Hollywood Bowl alongside her brother Finneas O'Connell, with guest appearances from well-known musical figures in Los Angeles.

== Songs and recordings inspired by the COVID-19 pandemic and its effects ==
Artist(s)	Song	Notes	Source
Broadway Boys	"Nag-iisa"	This is a song that was released in 2020 that dedicates to frontliners and patients who survived the COVID-19 pandemic. Also it is a part of 500-year commemoration of Christianity, victory and humanity as part of the quincentennial commemorations.	
Raizo Chabeldin, Biv de Vera and ABS-CBN regional news anchors	"Pag-ibig ang Hihilom sa Daigdig"	This is a song that was released by ABS-CBN on April 3, 2020, and performed by Raizo Chabeldin and Biv de Vera. Aside from "We Heal As One" that was released a week ago, the song inspires all the Filipinos to spread love and hope amidst the COVID-19 pandemic. At the end of the song, ABS-CBN's regional news anchors were also featured to sing "Don't share the hate and scare, spread never-ending love and care" two times, along with the real Kapamilyas from different provinces. It is the official theme song for ABS-CBN Foundation's Pantawid ng Pag-ibig. The music video was released on April 3, 2020.	
K-Pop artists	"We Can!"	This song interpolates Pinkfong's "Baby Shark".	
Vice Ganda	"Corona Bye-Bye Na!"	This song was performed at ABS-CBN's Pantawid ng Pag-ibig: At Home Together Concert, A Kapamilya Special Concert that hopes all Filipinos to follow the law to protect themselves from the COVID-19 pandemic widespread. Hosted by ABS-CBN News and Current Affairs' correspondents, Alvin Elchico and Zen Hernandez.	
BTS	"Life Goes On"	The lyrics of the song have been described as uplifting and seeking to provide hope to fans during the pandemic.	
BTS Skytrain Employees	"Covid-19: Dance Against the Virus"	This song was featured on online newspapers such as Hong Kong's South China Morning Post, Indonesia's The Jakarta Post and Thailand's Thai Rath. It reminds passengers to wash their hands, wear a facemask, practice social distancing, and to stay home or go to the hospital for testing and treatment if infected. This is part of the train service's 20th anniversary campaign.	
CMC Vision Sisters	"Go Away Corona!"	A secular upbeat song to uplift and enlighten people for them to be safe against COVID-19.	
SB19	"Ikako"	An SB19 song which encourages Filipinos to uplift their positive attitude despite the COVID-19 pandemic and other bad news in 2020.	
Kim Chiu	"Bawal Lumabas"	A Kim Chiu's statement regarding the COVID-19 pandemic and the ABS-CBN franchise renewal controversy that was made into a song, which became a dance challenge on YouTube and TikTok.	
Julie Anne San Jose	"Pagbangon"	A GMA News and Public Affairs charity single which is dedicated to all frontliners and patients who survived the COVID-19 pandemic to raise awareness against the virus. Also it is part of commemoration of GMA Network's 70th anniversary campaign, Buong Puso Para Sa Pilipino.	
Morissette	"Phoenix"	The song's music video is an audio-visual feast, featuring Morissette's clear and powerful vocals, as well as amazing visual components and narration about how a dull and lifeless environment during the COVID-19 pandemic could be turned around by hope and chance.	
Jamie Rivera, Iñigo Pascual, Julie Anne San Jose, Jed Madela, Robert Seña, Isay Alvarez-Seña, Mark Bautista, Rita Daniela, Gary Valenciano, Paolo Valenciano, KZ Tandingan, Aicelle Santos, Ogie Alcasid, Menchu Lauchengco, Michael Williams, Alden Richards, Ken Chan, Christian Bautista, Sarah Geronimo, Martin Nievera, Pops Fernandez, Bamboo Manalac, Apl.de.ap, Lani Misalucha, and Lea Salonga	"We Heal As One"	A reworked version of the 2019 Southeast Asian Games theme song, "We Win As One", originally performed by Lea Salonga. This version brings all OPM singers together to raise awareness against COVID-19 pandemic and pays tribute to the frontline workers. GMA News and Public Affairs, particularly Jessica Soho is the first one to promote this song. It is produced by Floy Quintos & composed by Ryan Cayabyab. Also it is part of commemoration of GMA Network's 70th Anniversary campaign, Buong Puso Para Sa Pilipino.	
AKB48	"離れていても" "Hanareteitemo" (Even When We Are Apart)	An AKB48's charity single which is dedicated to all frontliners and patients who survived the COVID-19 pandemic. This song brought all of its current members, in addition to all former aces of the entire group. Jurina Matsui is the only non-AKB48 active member and an SKE48 member to take part of this song, as well as Sayaka Yamamoto who was an NMB48 graduate and Rino Sashihara who was an AKB48 & HKT48 former ace & alumnus.	
BNK48 and CGM48	"Touch by Heart"	A charity single which is dedicated to all frontliners and patients who survived the COVID-19 pandemic. It has 8 versions that were performed by the groups' members. Special version was performed by all members in two sister groups, Thai version for BNK48 & CGM48 leaders, Grab, English, Japanese & Isan versions for selected 1st Generation members, Lanna version for all CGM48 members & Chinese version for selected members in BNK48's 2 generations.	
AKB48 Team SH and CGM48	"Dareka no Tame Ni"	Chinese and Thai versions of AKB48's digital single. This is dedicated to all frontliners and patients who survived the COVID-19 pandemic, and to all Chiang Mai residents who survived the bushfire.	
Namewee and Malaysian musicians and singers	"OK Lah"	A song which is dedicated to all frontliners and patients who survived the COVID-19 pandemic. Also it is connected with Malaysia's Ministry of Health to impose Movement Control Order to stop the spread of COVID-19.	
Anonymotif and Justin Trudeau	"Speaking Moistly"	Press conference remarks by Canadian prime minister Trudeau served as basis for YouTube remix by Edmonton-based producer anonymotif (Brock Tyler).	
ArtistsCAN	"Lean on Me"	Bilingual rendition of Bill Withers song performed at Canadian benefit concert Stronger Together, Tous Ensemble. Single released in aid of Canadian Red Cross. Initiated by Tyler Shaw and Fefe Dobson; features Michael Bublé, Justin Bieber, Avril Lavigne, Bryan Adams and others.	
Cardi B and iMarkkeyz	"Coronavirus (Remix)"	Remix by Brooklyn DJ iMarkkeyz of an Instagram video posted by rapper Cardi B.	
Michael Ball and Captain Tom Moore	"You'll Never Walk Alone"	British fundraiser in aid of NHS Charities Together, recorded by actor-singer Ball, Second World War veteran Moore and NHS Voices of Care Choir. The song reached UK number 1 on April 24, 2020, days before Moore celebrated his 100th birthday.	
Pat Benatar and Neil Giraldo	"Together"		
Alec Benjamin	"Six Feet Apart"	Lyrics relate to compliance with social distancing guidelines.	
David Bisbal and Aitana	"Si tú la quieres"	Bisbal remixed his song with new vocals from Aitana, accompanied by a video showing the two singers in isolation.	
James Blunt	"The Greatest"	Single released in aid of British National Health Service.	
Bono, will.i.am, Jennifer Hudson and Yoshiki	"#Sing4Life"	Bono originally performed the song on March 17, 2020, as "Let Your Love Be Known"; remixed version with collaborators was released on YouTube on March 24, 2020.	
Brujeria	"COVID-666"		
Koffee	"Lockdown"		
Buddy Brown	"The Coronavirus Song"		
Michael Bublé, Barenaked Ladies and Sofia Reyes	"Gotta Be Patient"	Original song was by three Barcelona roommates performing as Stay Homas during their lockdown. Bublé's cover version is in aid of Canadian Red Cross and Argentine Red Cross.	
Jackie Chan, Xiao Zhan, Wang Leehom and others	"坚信爱会赢" (Believe Love Will Triumph)	Collaboration between Chinese singers and actors, released by Chinese state media.	
Charli XCX	"claws"	Lyrics discuss love in time of self-isolation; second single from her album how i'm feeling now, which was recorded during lockdown.	
Luke Combs	"Six Feet Apart"	Title refers to social distancing guidelines issued by the CDC in the USA.	
Alice Cooper	"Don't Give Up"	Lyrics relate to staying strong in the face of the virus.	
Neil Diamond	"Hands... Washing Hands"	Diamond re-recorded the classic song "Sweet Caroline" with updated lyrics about washing hands for safety during the pandemic.	
Fleur East	"Not Alone"	Charity single in aid of British NHS COVID-19 Appeal.	
Melody Gardot	"From Paris with Love"	Collaborative project featuring a "global digital orchestra".	
Ben Gibbard	"Life in Quarantine"		
Gmac Cash	"Coronavirus"	Detroit rapper Gmac Cash later released "Big Gretch", a tribute to Gretchen Whitmer's handling of the pandemic.	
Ariana Grande and Justin Bieber	"Stuck with U"	The collaboration is in aid of the First Responders Children's Foundation. Topped the US Billboard Hot 100.	
Kamal Haasan, Ghibran and others	"Arivum Anbum"	Tamil-language song with lyrics written by actor-politician Haasan and composed by Ghibran, with performances by many Indian musicians.	
Hopsin	"Covid Mansion"		
Iceage	"Lockdown Blues"		
Miley Cyrus	"Angels like You"	A music video about the singer's performance at the Super Bowl LV pre-game show on February 7, 2021. At the end of the video, a message was endorsed the COVID-19 vaccine.	
Italian Allstars 4 Life	"Ma il cielo è sempre blu"	Italian all-star cover version of Rino Gaetano's 1975 hit. Released in aid of Italian Red Cross. Features over 50 artists including Eros Ramazzotti, Nek and Diodato.	
Jöran Steinhauer	"Vi vogliamo bene"		
Elisa and Tommaso Paradiso	"Andrà tutto bene"	Title inspired by the slogan used by Italian people during quarantine.	
Avril Lavigne	"We Are Warriors"		
Lady Leshurr	"Quarantine Speech"		
JJ Lin and Stefanie Sun	"Stay with You"	Song by two of Singapore's best-known singers in tribute to medical staff in Wuhan, China.	
Oh Land	"I Miss One Week Ago"		
Katherine McNamara	"Just Like James"	Lyrics refer to the character James Bond. As part of a donation by WHO for the COVID-19 Solidarity Response Fund.	
Live Lounge Allstars	"Times Like These"	Cover of Foo Fighters song by charity supergroup organised by BBC Radio 1. Originally shown as part of The Big Night In telethon. Reached number one in the UK.	
BBC Radio 2 Allstars	"Stop Crying Your Heart Out"	Cover of Oasis song by charity supergroup organised by BBC Radio 2. Originally shown as part of Children in Need telethon. Reached number seven in the UK.	
Matt Lucas	"Thank You Baked Potato"	Reworked version of his "Baked Potato Song" from Shooting Stars. In aid of the Feed NHS campaign.	
Mister Cumbia	"La Cumbia del Coronavirus"		
New Kids on the Block	"House Party"	Featuring Boyz II Men, Big Freedia, Naughty by Nature and Jordin Sparks.	
NIOEH, Khắc Hưng, Min and Erik	"Ghen Cô Vy"	Song doubling as a public service announcement, issued by Vietnam's National Institute of Occupational and Environmental Health to encourage COVID-19 hygiene measures. An English-language version was also released.	
OneRepublic	"Better Days"	Released in aid of MusiCares Foundation's COVID-19 Relief Fund.	
Piso 21	"Tomar distancia"	Title is Spanish for "Keep your distance".	
Pitbull	"I Believe That We Will Win (World Anthem)"	Released in aid of various charities around the world according to the music video.	
Psychs	"Spreadin' (Coronavirus)"		
Queen and Adam Lambert	"We Are the Champions"	Revised version, released in aid of COVID-19 Solidarity Response Fund.	
A. R. Rahman and Prasoon Joshi	"Hum Haar Nahi Maanenge"	Single released by Indian composer Rahman, lyricist Joshi and other Indian performers in aid of PM CARES Fund.	
Selena Gomez	"Dance Again"	As part of a donation by MusiCares for the MusiCares COVID-19 Relief Fund.	
Jaden Smith	"Cabin Fever"		
Reignwolf	"Cabin Fever"		
Residente	"Antes que el mundo se acabe"		
Resistiré 2020	"Resistiré"	All-star Spanish cover version of Dúo Dinámico's 1988 hit. Song became anthem during Spain's lockdown, popularly sung by citizens to encourage Spanish health system. Performers include David Bisbal, Melendi, Álex Ubago and Álvaro Soler.	
Resistiré México	"Resistiré"	All-star Mexican cover version of Dúo Dinámico's 1988 hit. Performers include Belinda, Cristian Castro and Gloria Trevi.	
Taylor Swift	"Epiphany"	From her album Folklore (2020), recorded during the COVID-19 lockdowns	
Stunna 4 Vegas	"Covid-19"	From his album Welcome to 4 Vegas (2020)	
Thomas Rhett	"Be a Light"	Features Keith Urban, Reba McEntire, Hillary Scott and Chris Tomlin. In aid of MusiCares COVID-19 Relief Fund.	
The Rolling Stones	"Living in a Ghost Town"	Mick Jagger fast-tracked the release of the song due to its relevance to social distancing and changed some lyrics to refer to the pandemic.	
Molly Sandén, Victor Leksell and Joakim Berg	"Sverige"	Cover version of 2002 song by Berg's band Kent. Released in aid of Sweden's Radiohjälpen's (Radio Aid) campaign for coronavirus.	
Adam Sandler	"The Quarantine Song"	Film actor Sandler debuted the song on The Tonight Show Starring Jimmy Fallon on April 2, 2020.	
Cast of Pitch Perfect	"Love On Top"	Cast members of the film franchise Pitch Perfect, performed a rendition of the Beyoncé song. Recorded in isolation as part of the charity for Unicef, from the COVID-19 pandemic and the explosion of Beirut.	
Clairo	"Just for Today"		
Tix	"Karantene"	Lyrics refer to the COVID-19 lockdowns and quarantine measures. The song topped the Norwegian singles chart in April 2020.	
Till Lindemann and David Garrett	"Alle Tage ist kein Sonntag"		
Avenue Beat	"F2020"	Lyrics refer to the events of 2020, including the COVID-19 pandemic.	
Twenty One Pilots	"Level of Concern"	Lyrics refer to quarantine and concern about the virus. In aid of Live Nation's Crew Nation charity.	
Tyga x Curtis Roach	"Bored in the House"		
Chris Webby	"Quarantine (Freeverse)"		
Weezer	"Hero"	Lyrics pay tribute to "the stay at home dreamers, the Zoom graduators, the sourdough bakers and the essential workers".	
Yofrangel	"Corona Virus"	Released on February 9, 2020, Dominican singer Yofrangel's viral hit was one of the earliest songs on the subject.	
Ladilla Rusa	"A un metro y medio de ti"	The track, a techno-rumba anthem in a world starring COVID-19, is about an impossible love in a supermarket queue. Although they didn't want to write anything related to the pandemic, this makinero drama stems from an anecdote in which they had to separate a metre and a half to smoke on the terrace of a bar.	
Coheed and Cambria	"Comatose" "Disappearing Act" "Love Murder One" "The Liars Club"	Several songs on their album Vaxis – Act II: A Window of the Waking Mind were inspired by the quarantines and lockdowns experienced during the pandemic.	
Lea Salonga	"Dream Again"	Released on August 21, 2020, the single is "an anthem for resilience and hope and a reminder for all of us that dreamed once before that it’s time to dream again." The music video for the song features fans holding up signs of things they dream of doing again. Profits from the single were donated to charities supporting COVID-19 relief around the world, including The Actor's Fund.	
Ben Rector	A Ben Rector Christmas	With the lack of business responsibilities amidst the pandemic following the cancellation of his tour, Rector focused all of his attention on his creative works. He would rewrite most of his upcoming album The Joy of Music. In addition he found time to write a Christmas album, a project he had always wanted to do. The pandemic would influence the lyrics of one of the songs' tracks, "The Thanksgiving Song", with the line, "we’ve made it through / I do believe / the longest year in history."	
Billy Pilgrim	In the Time Machine	From cleaning out his house during the pandemic, country singer Kristian Bush discovered a copy of an unreleased album from his old band Billy Pilgrim, In the Time Machine. They had assumed all 500 copies of the album were sold after the master tapes of the recordings burned in a studio fire in 2000. He reformed Billy Pilgrim with Andrew Hyra to re-release the album.	
Ana Leira Carnero	"Funeral Music for Pandemic's Fallen Heroes"	A work composed with heartfelt emotion during this pandemic that is ravaging humanity... A musical tribute to those who gave their lives to care for the health of patients. The composer chose the tonal writing, in minor mode, and with an elegiac tone, as the most appropriate to carry out the tribute. The piece is in sonata form, with a first theme that expresses the pain of human losses, a second theme that evokes the heroism of those who fell in the exercise of their profession, and at the end it represents a heroic fight, no longer to care for others but to save one's own life, until the last notes bring death. Musically, it can be found references to funeral marches by Beethoven, Mendelssohn, Chopin and Alkan, as well as allusions to funeral drums.	

== See also ==
- 2020 in music
- 2020 in rock music/2021 in rock music
- National Independent Venue Association
