= Dream Again =

Dream Again may refer to:

- Dream Again (song), a 2020 single by Lea Salonga
- Dream Again (Phil Keaggy album), 2006
- Dream Again (Lili Añel album), 2007
- Dream Again Tour, a 2022 concert tour by Lea Salonga
