= List of X Japan concert tours and performances =

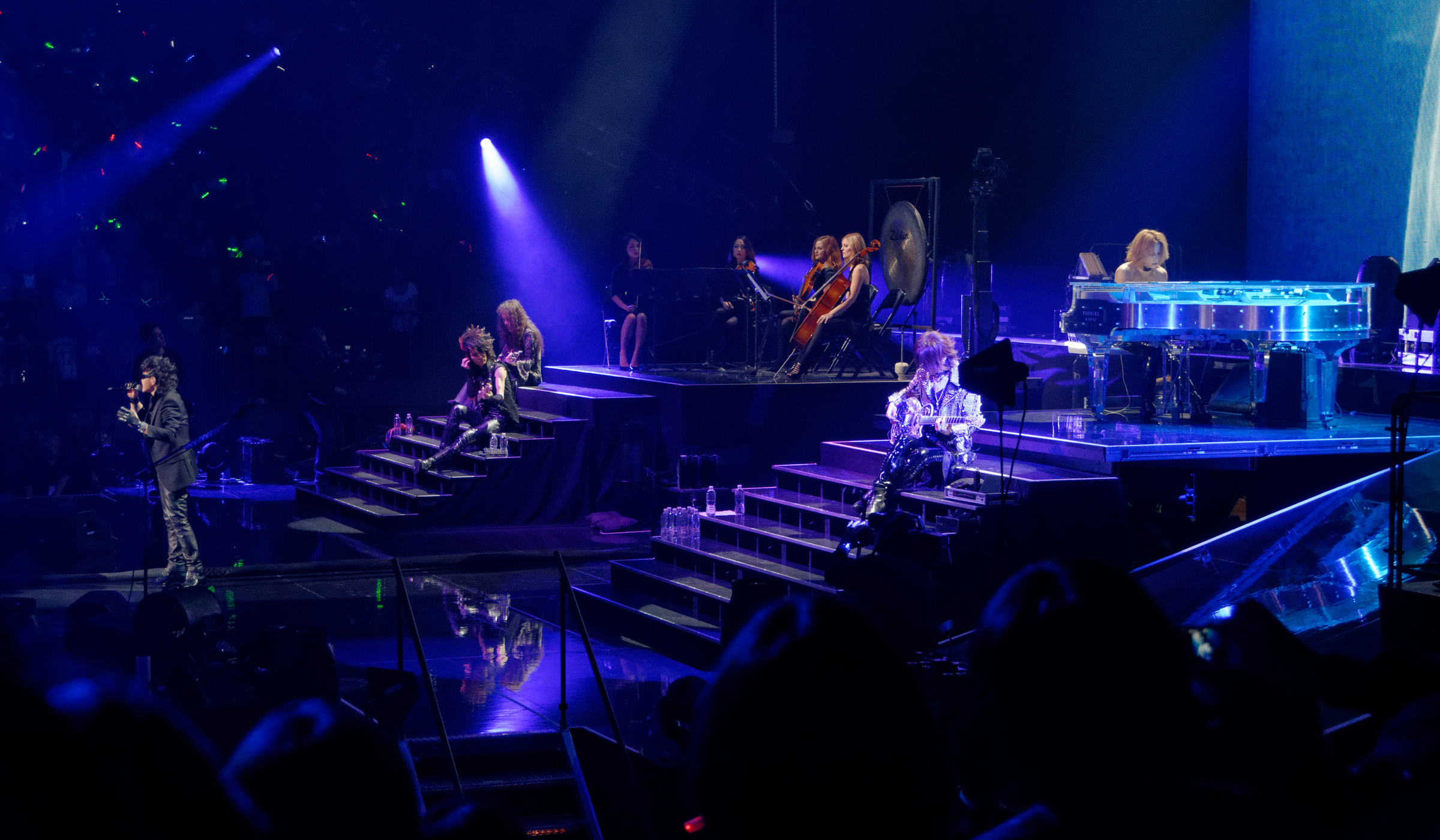
X Japan at Madison Square Garden, 2014

Japanese heavy metal band X Japan has performed more than 250 concerts from 1987 until October 2018. This number does not include the so-called "film gig" concerts, which are included below.

== Concerts and other performances ==
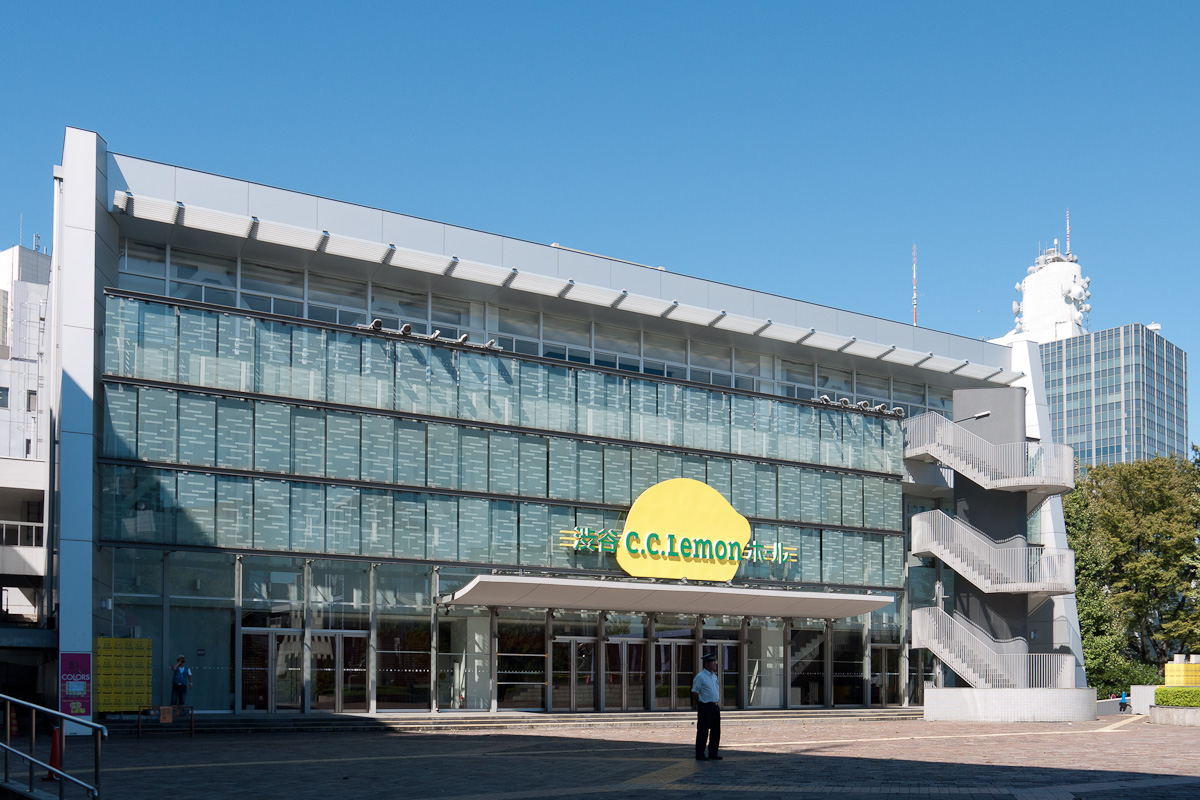
A March 1989 show at Shibuya Kōkaidō (pictured in 2011) was released as the Blue Blood Tour Bakuhatsu Sunzen Gig concert video

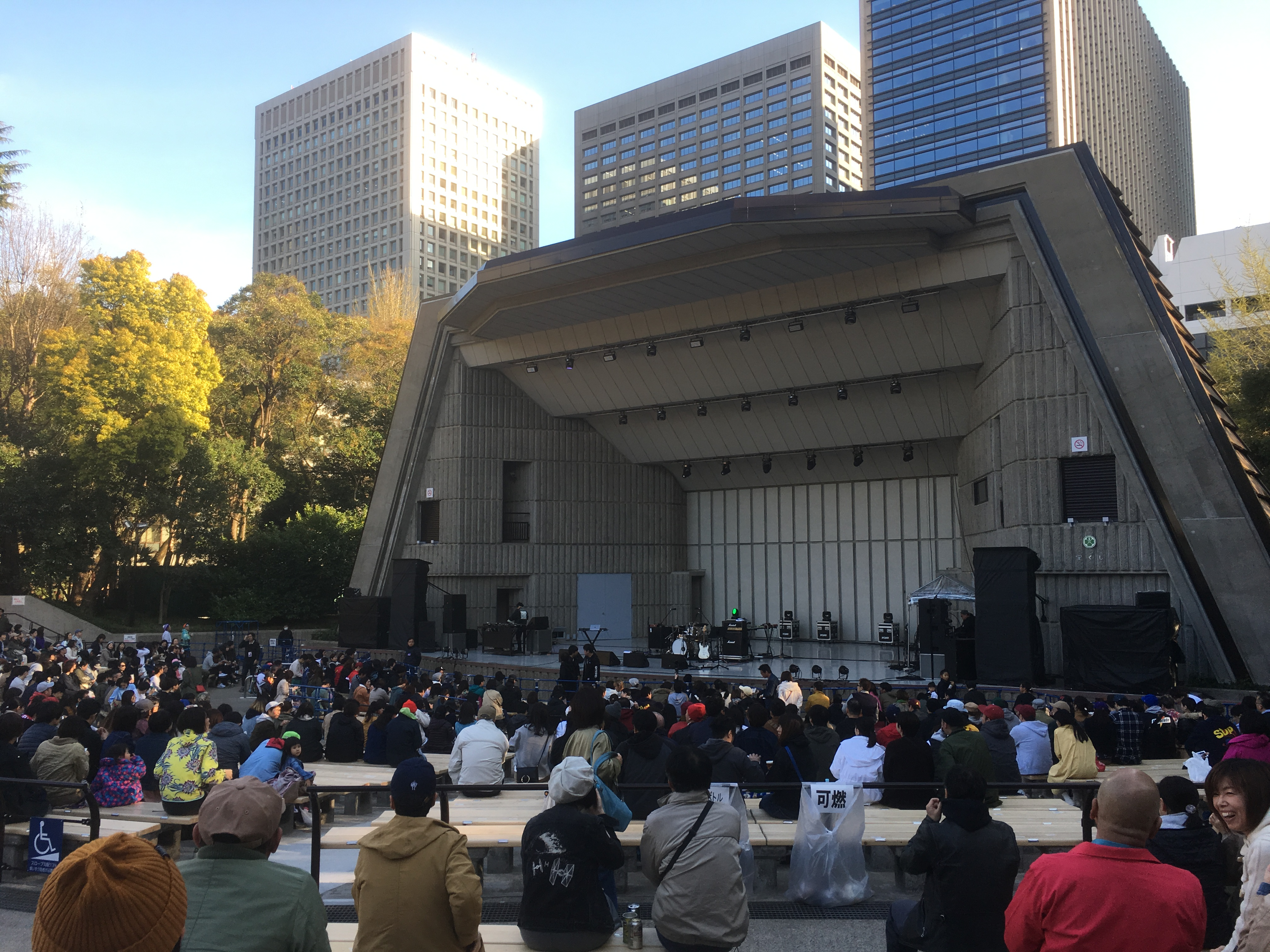
Hibiya Open-Air Concert Hall (pictured in 2019)

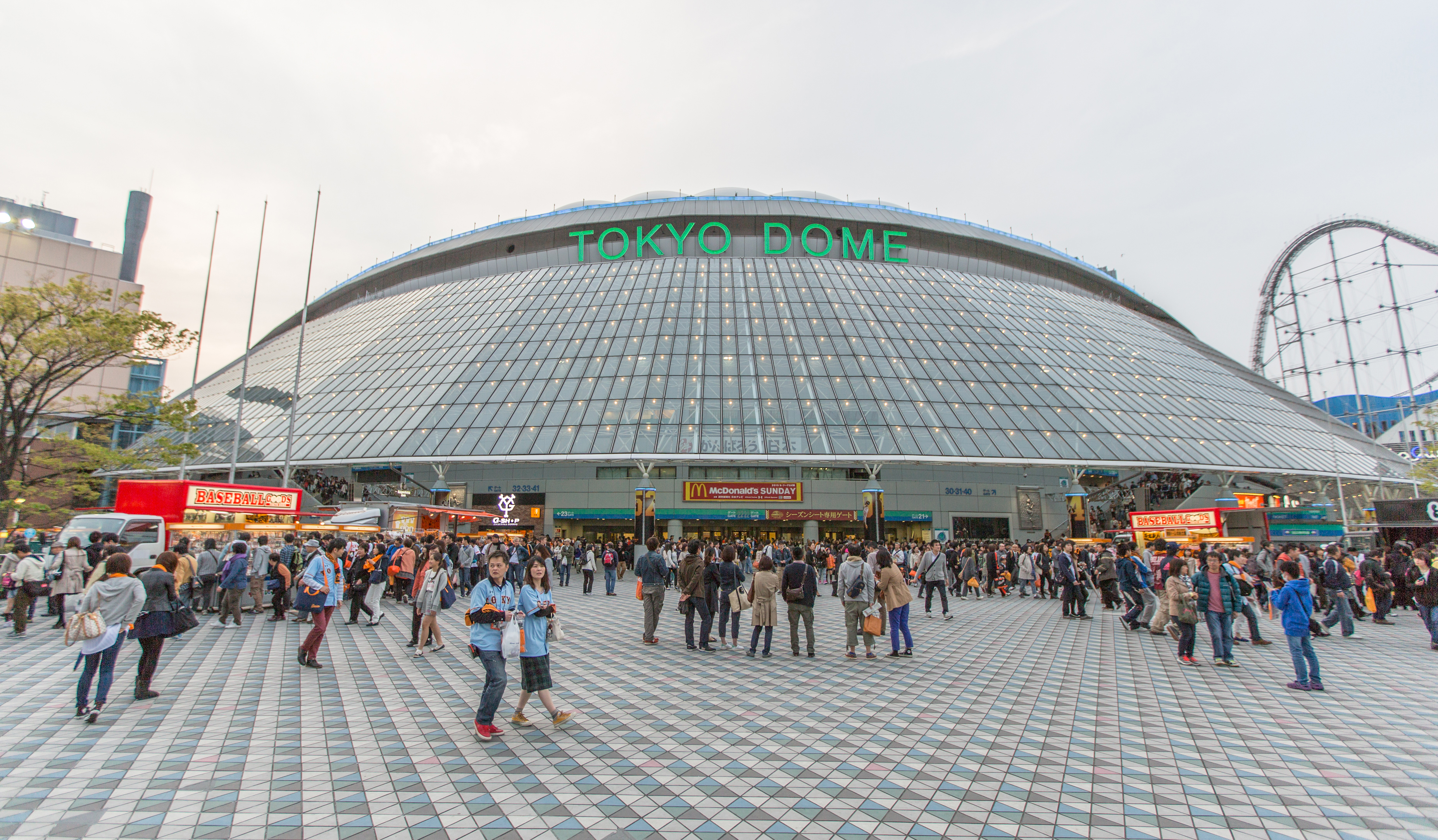
X Japan have performed at the Tokyo Dome 18 times

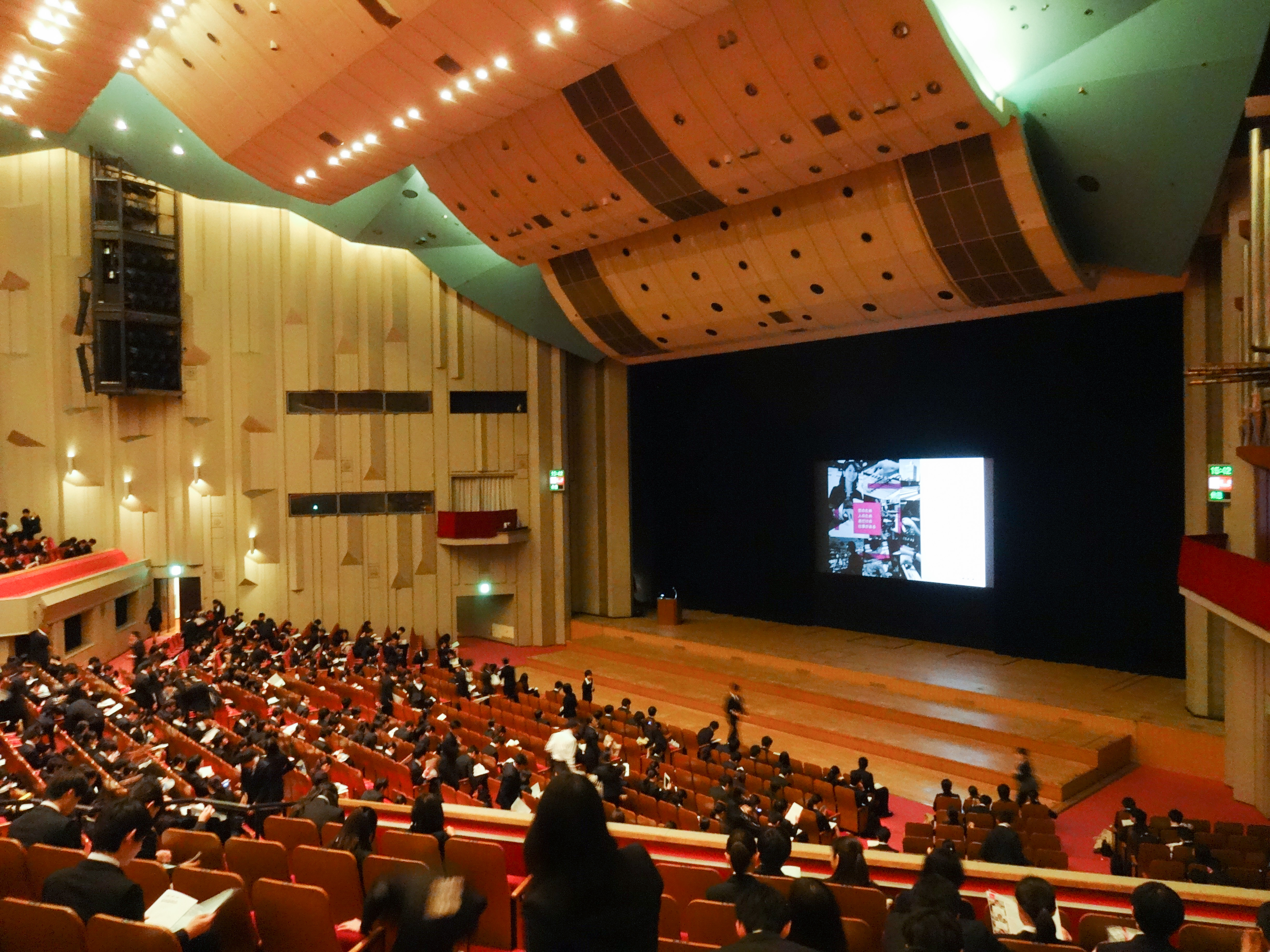
NHK Hall (pictured in 2015) hosted 1991's X with Orchestra concert, where the band was backed by an orchestra

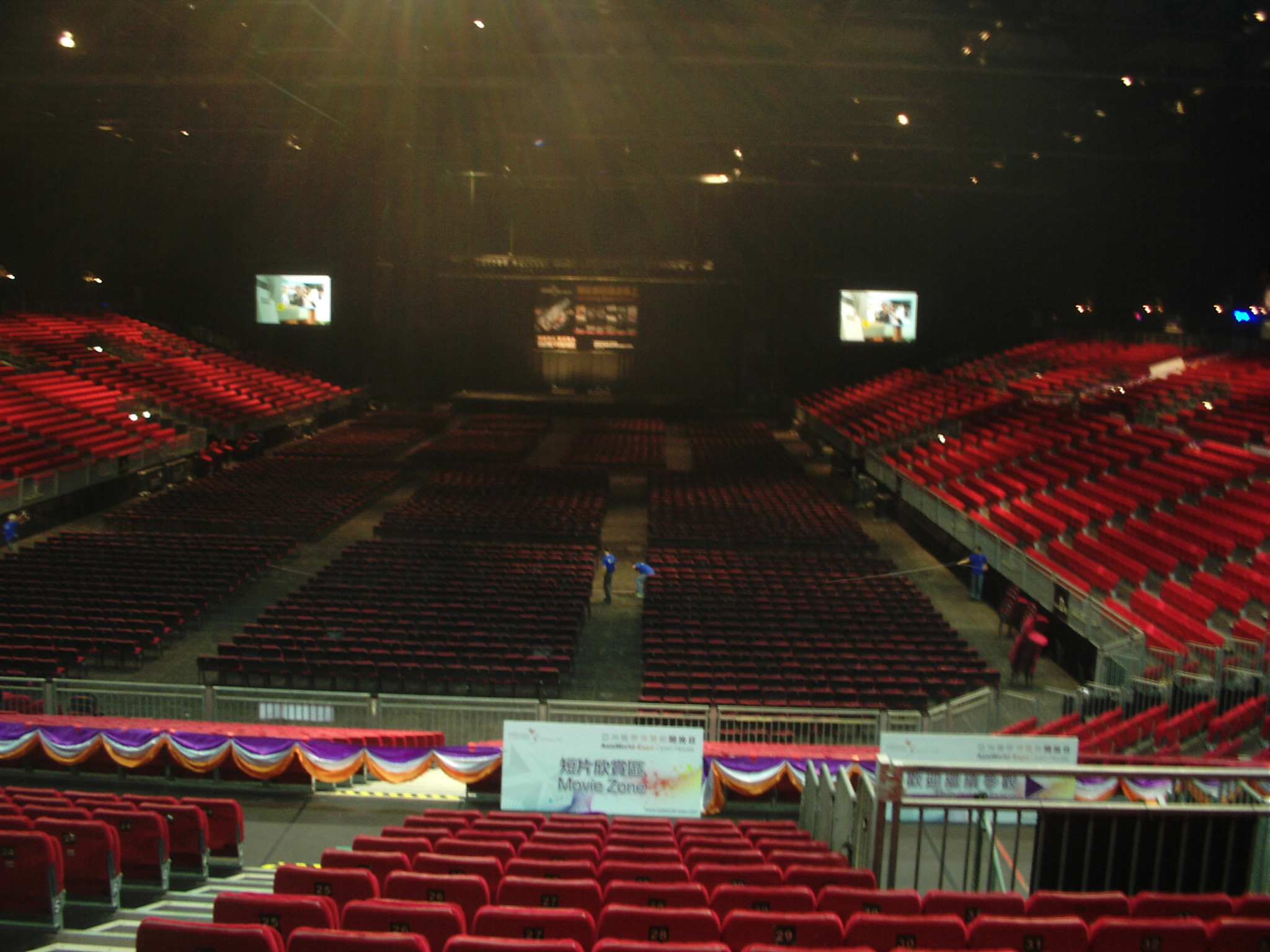
In 2009, Hong Kong's Asia World Expo (pictured in 2010) was the location of X's first show outside Japan

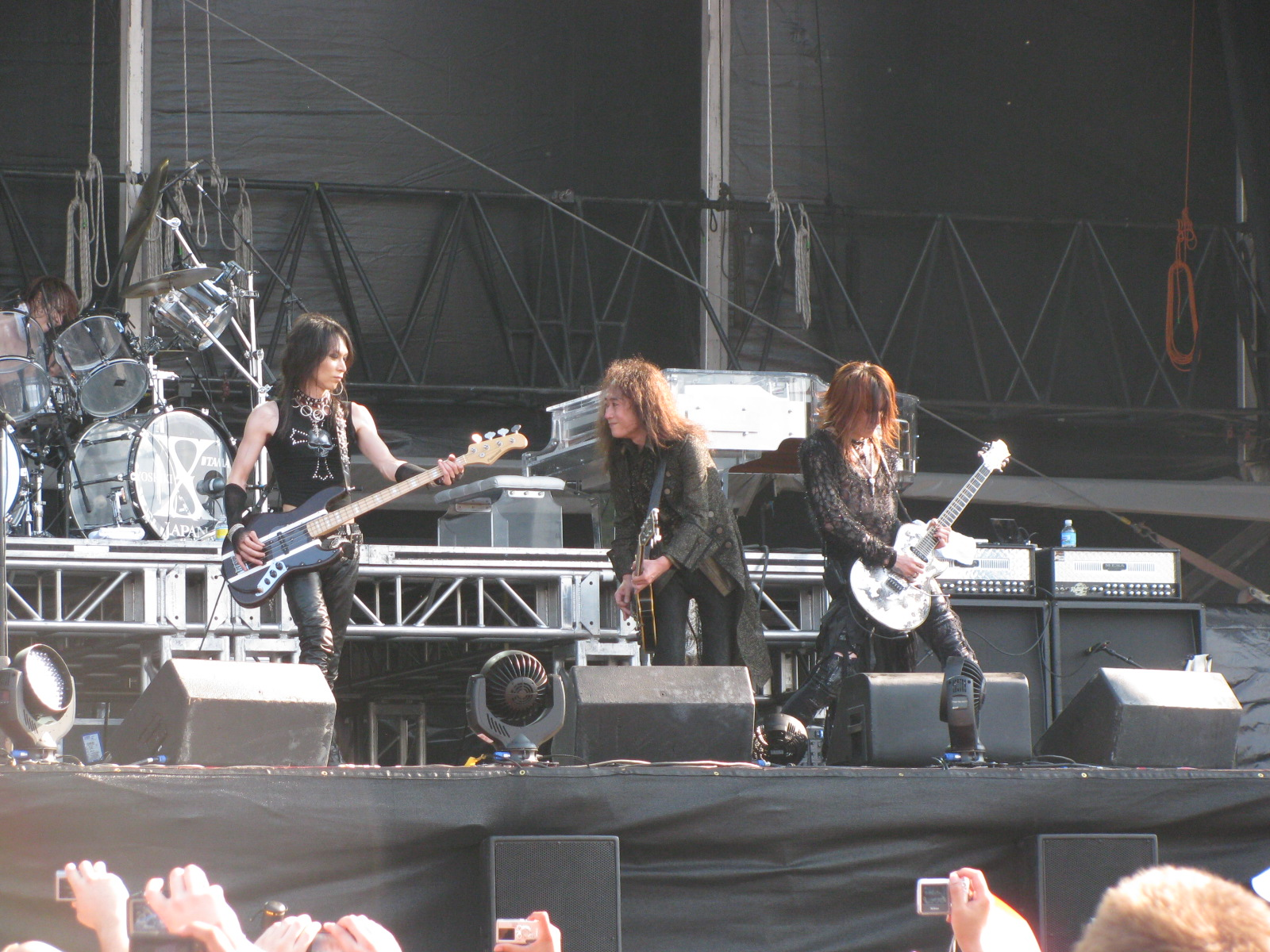
X Japan performed at the 2010 Lollapalooza festival in America

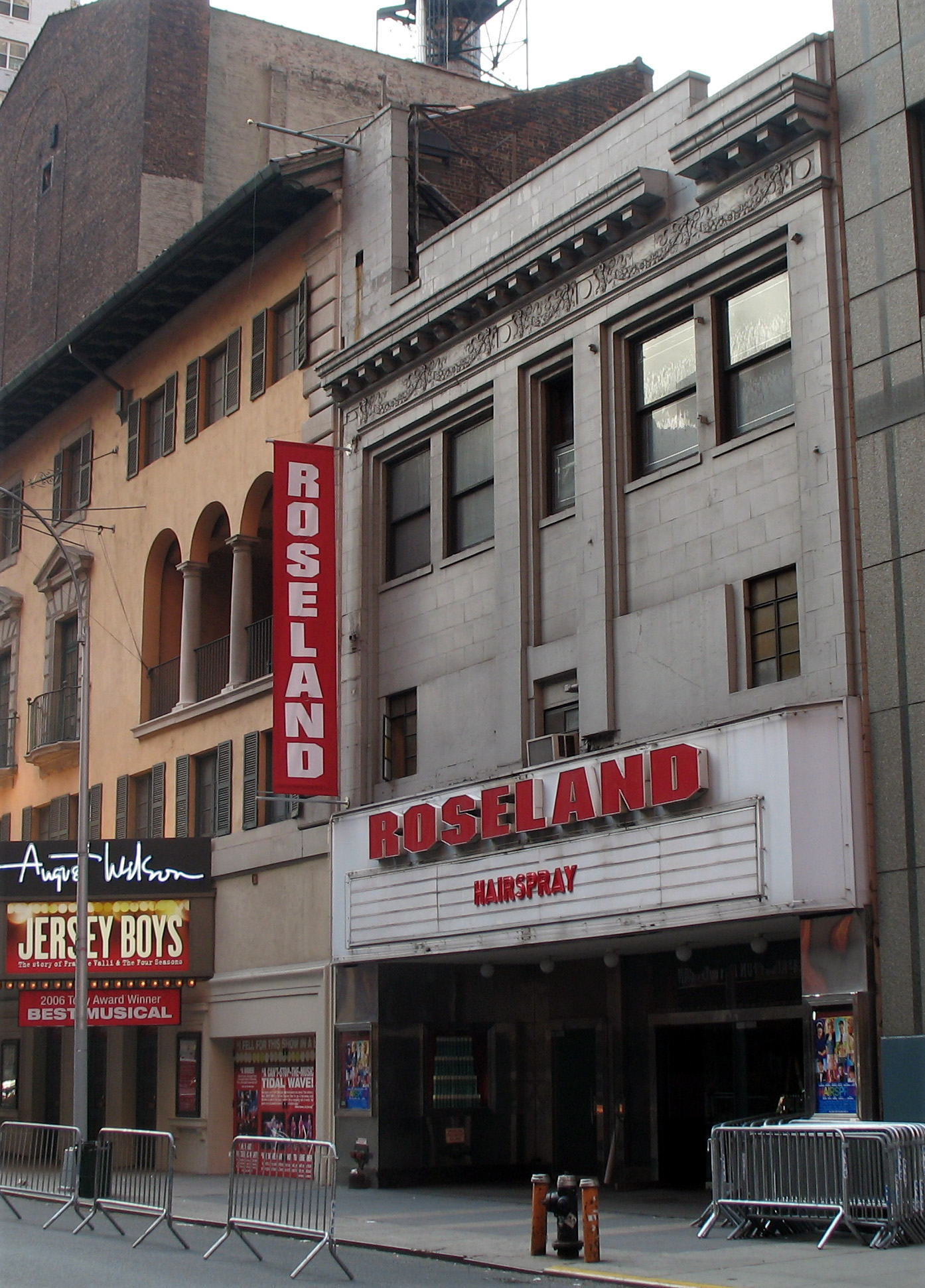
Roseland Ballroom (pictured in 2007)

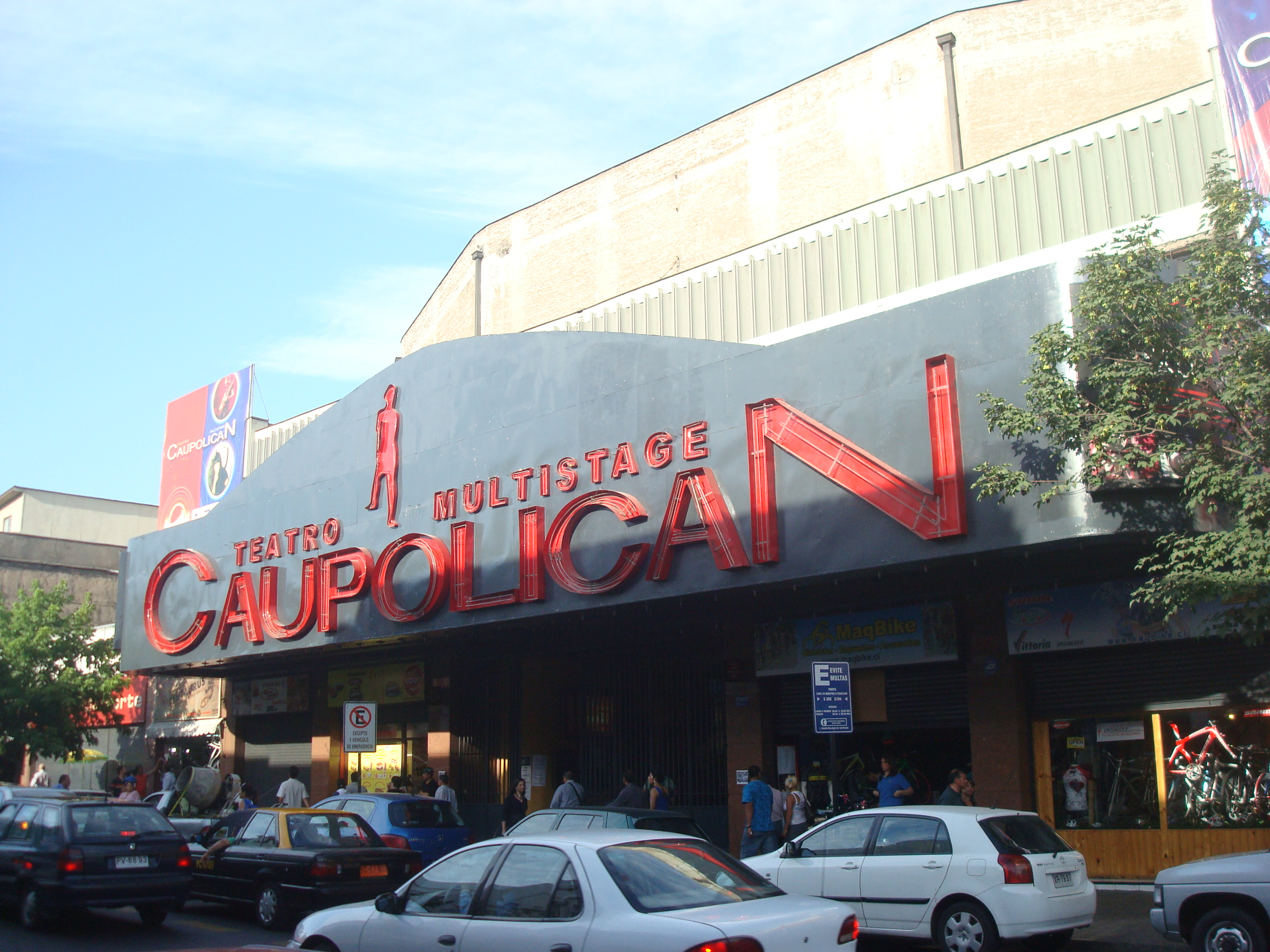
Teatro Caupolicán (pictured in 2009)

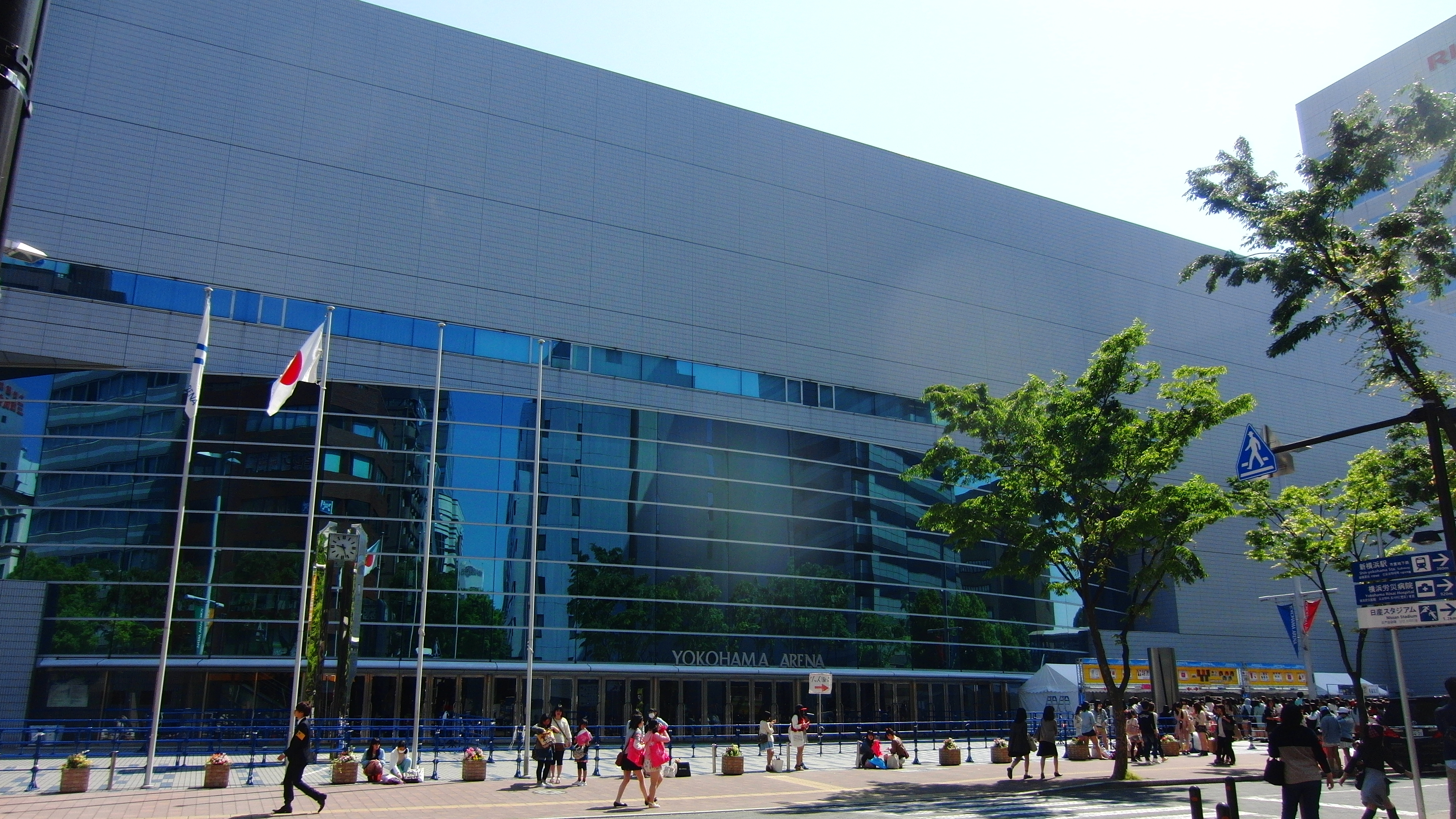
X Japan performed four consecutive nights at Yokohama Arena in 2015, and another four in 2017

Year	Type	Name	Stops / Location
1987	festival	Bakuhatsu Sunzen recording (爆発寸前撮影)	4. 10. Kagurazaka Explosion (神楽坂EXPLOSION), Tokyo
1987	festival	Skull Trash Zone	2 concerts, 2 locations: 4. 14. Toshima kōkaidō (豊島公会堂); 5. 17. Nagoya Flex Hall
1987	contest	Band Explosion '87	6. 7. Tateyama Sōkōkai-kan (山商工会館)
1987	concert	Oneman Gig	7. 25. Meguro Live Station (目黒LIVE STATION)
1987	concert	Xclamation muryō haifu gig (Xclamation無料配布GIG)	2 concerts, 2 locations: 8. 6. Osaka Bourbon House; 8. 29. Meguro Rockmaykan (目黒鹿鳴館)
1987	festival	Rock Monster August	8. 30. Sports Valley Kyoto (スポーツバレー京都)
1987	tour	1987 Winter Tour	6 concerts, 5 locations: 11. 23., 24. Meguro Rockmaykan (目黒鹿鳴館); 11. 29. Osaka Bourbon House; 11. 30. Kobe Chicken George; 12. 2. Kyoto Vivre Hall; 12. 3. Toyohashi kagoyahōru (豊橋かごやホール)
1987	contest	CBS/SONY audition '87	12. 26.
1987	festival	Heavy Metal Days Extra	12. 23. Saitama kaikan large hall (埼玉会館大ホール)
1987	festival	Daynamite Year End Party	12. 29. Meguro Live Station (目黒LIVE STATION)
1987	festival	All Night Metal party '87 to '88	12. 31. Meguro Rockmaykan (目黒鹿鳴館)
1988
1988	festival	Metal Indies 2	1. 10. Nakano kōkaidō (中野公会堂)
1988	tour	Vanishing Tour '88 Spring	7 concerts, 7 locations: 3. 22. Toyohashi kagoyahōru (豊橋かごやホール); 3. 24. Hiroshima Woody Street; 3. 26. Kobe Fishdance Hall; 3. 26. Kyoto Big Bang; 3. 30. ōmiya Freaks'; 4. 2. Maebashi Rattan; 4. 3. Shinjuku SF Live Theater
1988	tour	Vanishing Tour Special	2 concerts, 2 locations: 5. 5. Tokyo Nakano kōkaidō (東京中野公会堂); 6. 10. Osaka Midō kaikan (大阪御堂会館)
1988	tour	Vanishing Tour Vol.2	23 concerts, 19 locations: 6. 2., 3. Meguro Rockmaykan (目黒鹿鳴館); 6. 6., 7. Shibuya Egg Man; 6. 13., 14. Hiroshima Woody Street; 6. 16. Kokura In & Out; 6. 17. Fukuoka Drum Be-1 (福岡徒楽夢Be-1); 6. 19. Matsuyama Crazy Horse; 6. 29. Maebashi Rattan; 7. 1. Yokohama 7th Avenue; 7. 2. ōmiya Freaks'; 7. 4. Nagoya Flex Hall; 7. 5. Toyohashi kagoyahōru (豊橋かごやホール); 7. 7. Numazu Macuno Hall (沼津松乃ホール); 7. 16. Kanazawa Vanvan V4; 7. 17. Niigata Woody; 7. 19. Sendai Forus Morningmoon Studio; 7. 20. Aomori Free Space 1/3; 7. 22., 23. Sapporo Messe Hall; 7. 25. Asahikawa Studio9 Machiihōru (Studio9マチイホール); 7. 26. Kitami yuuyake matsuri (北見夕焼けまつり)
1988	festival	Heavy Metal Days Vol.7	8. 27. Saitama Kaikan
1988	concert	X at Sports Valley Kyoto	9. 4. Sports Valley Kyoto (スポーツバレー京都)
1988	concert	1. Extasy Summit	9. 30. Osaka Bourbon House
1988	tour	Burn Out Tour '88 Oct.	12 concerts, 9 locations: 10. 8. ōmiya Freaks'; 10.9. Toyohashi kagoyahōru (豊橋かごやホール); 10. 11, 12. Osaka Bourbon House; 10. 14. Fukuoka Drum Be-1 (福岡徒楽夢Be-1); 10. 18. Nagoya HeartLand Studio; 10. 20. Sendai CAD Hall; 10. 22. Akita Forus Morningmoon Studio; 10. 23., 24., 25. Sapporo Messe Hall; 10. 30. Kawasaki Club Citta
1988	festival	Extasy Summit	11. 6. Meguro Rockmaykan (目黒鹿鳴館)
1988	festival	Street Fighting Men	11. 12. MZA Ariake
1988	festival	All Night Metal Party '88 to '89	12. 31. Meguro Rockmaykan (目黒鹿鳴館)
1989	tour	Blue Blood Tour	14 concerts, 14 locations: 3. 13. Maebashi Gunma Civic Centre; 3. 16. Shibuya Kōkaidō; 4. 22. Kawasaki Club Citta'; 4. 25. Osaka Osaka Kōsei Nenkin Kaikan; 4. 26. Hiroshima Prefectural House of Culture; 4. 28. Kumamoto Yuubin chokin kaikan (熊本郵便貯金会館); 4. 29. Fukuoka Tsukushi kaikan (都久志会館); 5. 6. Sendai Izumity21; 5. 8. Sapporo Dōshin Hall (道新ホール); 5. 10. Aomori city House of Culture (青森市民文化ホール); 6. 3. Nagano NBS Hall (長野NBSホール); 6. 7. Kanazawa Center of Education (金沢教育会館); 6. 10. Hibiya Open-Air Concert Hall (日比谷野外音楽堂); 6. 13. Niigata city Hall of Culture and Music (新潟市音楽文化会館)
1989	concert	The 4th Flower Festival; X Comin Home. Kaette iku ze! Kiai o irete mattero yo! (X Comin Home.帰って行くぜ！気合いを入れて待ってろよ！)	3. 25. Tateyama Family Park
1989	festival	Club Wonderland	3. 29. Shibaura Ink Stick Sibaura Factory
1989	festival	5. Sat Rock Wave '89	4. 30. Nagashima Spa Land
1989	festival	Extasy Summit Vol. II	5.2. Meguro Rockmaykan (目黒鹿鳴館)
1989	tour	Blue Blood Tour Special Big Gig	2 concerts, 2 locations: 6. 5. Nagoya Aichi kinro kaikan (愛知県勤労会館); 6. 6. Osaka Orix Theater
1989	festival	Heavy Metal Days Vol. 8	7. 22. Saitama Kaikan
1989	festival	JR-EAST Pop Rockets '89	7. 30. Yuzawa Central Park Baseball Field (湯沢町中央公園野球場)
1989	festival	Kirin Sound Together Pop. Hill '89	8. 12. Ishikawa Forest Park (石川県森林公園)
1989	festival	The Rock Kids '89	8. 19. Fuji-Q Highland
1989	festival	Rock'n roll Olympic '89	8. 20. Sportsland SUGO
1989	Secret live	Secret Gig daimajin gonin gumi (SECRET GIG 大魔神五人組)	8. 28. Osaka a.m.HALL
1989	festival	Extasy Summit in ClubHouse	8. 29. Meguro Rockmaykan (目黒鹿鳴館)
1989	concert	Rock Monster "X" Special	9. 17. Sports Valley Kyoto (スポーツバレー京都)
1989	festival	Extasy Summit Special: Jōgai rantō-hen (Extasy Summit Special 〜場外乱闘篇〜)	9. 28. Shibuya Kōkaidō
1989	festival	Enfent Terrible: Kovaru beki kodomotachi (Enfent Terrible 〜怖るべき子供達〜)	12. 3. Shinagawa Terrada Warehouse F Building (品川寺田倉庫F号)
1989; 1990	tour	Rose & Blood Tour	35 concerts, 31 locations: 9. 29. Urawa Culture Center; 10. 1. Sendai Denryoku Hall (仙台電力ホール); 10. 2. Morioka Centre of Education (盛岡教育会館); 10. 4. Yamagata Prefectural Centre (山形県県民会館); 10. 5. Akita-ken jidō kaikan (秋田県児童会館); 10. 10. Osaka kōsei-kin kaikan (大阪厚生金会館); 10. 12. Kawasaki Industrial and Cultural Centre (川崎産業文化会館); 10. 14. Tochigi kaikan big hall (栃木会館大ホール); 10. 19. Okayama city House of Culture (岡山市民文化ホール); 10. 21. Kobe Cultural Centre (神戸文化大ホール); 10. 26. Kumamoto yuubin chokin hall (熊本郵便貯金ホール); 10. 27. Nagasaki Peace Park Hall of Peace; ~~10. 30. Fukuoka Momochi Palace~~ (Postponed due to Yoshiki's health condition); 10. 31. Hiroshima yuuin chokin kaikan hall (広島郵便貯金会館ホール); 11. 2. Matsuyama Ehime prefecture Cultural Centre (愛媛県民文化会館サブホール); 11. 5. Nagoya kōkaidō (名古屋市公会堂); 11. 7. Gunma Music Center (群馬音楽センター); ~~11. 8. Mito-shi minkaikan (水戸市民会館)~~ (Yoshiki collapsed during performance, concert halted); 11. 11. Nagano Prefectural Cultural Centre (長野県民文化会館中ホール); 11. 13. Toyama-ken minkaikan (富山県民会館); ~~11. 14. Fukui-ken minkaikan (福井県民会館)~~; ~~11. 16. Shizuoka Cultural Centre (静岡市民文化会館)~~; 11. 22. Shibuya Kōkaidō; Postponed due to Yoshiki's health condition: ~~11. 23. Shibuya Kōkaidō~~; ~~11. 25. Aomori Cultural Centre (青森市民文化会館)~~; ~~11. 27. Sapporo-shi min kaikan (札幌市民会館)~~; ~~11. 29. Kōriyama Cultural Centre (郡山市民文化センター)~~; ~~12. 21. Nagoya-shi kōkaidō (名古屋市公会堂)~~; ~~12. 22. Ishikawa kōsei-kin kaikan (石川厚生金会館)~~; ~~12. 24. Niigata Industrial Centre (新潟産業センター)~~; ~~12. 26., 27. Shibuya Kōkaidō~~; 1990: 2. 4. Nippon Budōkan; 3. 6. Shibuya Kōkaidō; 3. 9. Nagoya-shi kōkaidō (名古屋市公会堂); 3. 15. Shizuoka Prefecture Cultural Centre (静岡県民文化会館); 3. 19. Mito-shi minkaikan (水戸市民会館); 3. 23. Kōriyama Cultural Centre (郡山市民文化センター); 3. 28. Niigata Industrial and Cultural Centre (新潟産業文化センター); 4. 2. Fukui Cultural Centre (福井市文化会館); 4. 4. Ishikawa kōsei-kin kaikan (石川厚生金会館); 4. 9. Sapporo Cultural Centre (札幌市民文化会館); 4. 11. Aomori Cultural Centre (青森市民文化会館); 4. 17. Fukuoka Momochi Palace (福岡ももちパレス); 4. 20. Fukuoka-si minkaikan (福岡市民会館); 5. 7., 9. Nippon Budōkan (Re-scheduled for 12. 26., 27.); 5. 17. Osaka-jo Hall
1990	festival	5. Sat Rock Wave '90	4. 29. Nagoya Sōnai Park, athletic field
1990	Film gig	1990 X Film Gigs: Chi to bara ni mamirete (1990 X Film Gigs 〜血と薔薇にまみれて〜)	2 performances, 1 location: 12. 8., 9. Tokyo Bay NK Hall
1991	Film gig tour	1990 X Film Gigs: Chi to bara ni mamirete (1990 X Film Gigs 〜血と薔薇にまみれて〜)	39 performances, 37 locations: 2. 3. Aomori Cultural Centre (青森市民文化会館); 2. 3. Iwate Centre of Education (岩手教育会館); 2. 4. Akita Industrial Centre (秋田産業会館); 2. 7. Urawa Cultural Centre (浦和市文化センター); 2. 10. Nagano-shi minkaikan (長野市民会館); 2. 11. Matsumoto Cultural Centre (松本社会文化会館); 2. 12. Yamanashi Prefectural Cultural Centre (山梨県民会館); 2. 15. Fukushima-shi kōkaidō (福島市公会堂); 2. 16. Sendai Izumity21; 2. 17. Tochigi kaikain (栃木会館); 2. 18. Mito-shi minkaikan (水戸市民会館); 2. 20. Miyazaki MRT micc; 2. 21. Kagoshima Cultural Centre (鹿児島市民文化会館); 2. 22. Nagasaki-shi minkaikan (長崎市民会館); 2. 23. Ōita nōgyō kaikan (大分農業会館); 2. 25. Kumamoto Mielparque Hall (メルパルクホール熊本); 2. 26. Fukuoka Mielparque Hall (メルパルクホール福岡); 3. 1. Niigata Prefecture Cultural Centre (新潟県民会館); 3. 2. Toyama-ken minkaikan (富山県民会館); 3. 3. Ishikawa kōszei-kin kaikan (石川厚生金会館); 3. 5. Fukui Cultural Centre (福井市文化会館); 3. 7. Takamatsu-shi minkaikan (高松市民会館); 3. 8. Matsuyama Ehime prefecture Cultural Centre (愛媛県民文化会館); 3. 10. Kōchi RKC Hall (高知RKCホール); 3. 11. Tokushima Art Foundation for Culture (徳島県郷土文化会館); 3. 13. Kyoto kaikan (京都会館); 3. 14. Kobe International House; 3. 15. Shizuoka Cultural Centre (静岡市民文化会館); 3. 18. Sapporo-shi minkaikan (札幌市民会館); 3. 19. Asahikawa-shi kōkaidō (旭川市公会堂); 3. 20. Kitami Economic Centre (北見経済センター); 3. 22. Osaka kōsei-kin kaikan (大阪厚生金会館); 3. 23. Nagoya-shi kōkaidō (名古屋市公会堂); 3. 25. Tokuyama Cultural Centre (徳山市民文化会館); 3. 26. Okayama Cultural Centre (岡山市民文化会館); 3. 28. Hiroshima Mielparque Hall (広島メルパルクホール); 4. 6. Kawasaki Club Citta' (3回公演)
1991	festival	JT Super Sound '91 Have a Joyful Time	7. 31. Sendai Resort Park Onikōbe (鬼首高原 仙台リゾートパーク・オニコウベ)
1991	tour	Cup Noodle 20th Anniversary Hot Gigs; Violence in Jealousy Tour 1991: Yume no Naka ni Dake Ikite (Violence In Jealousy Tour 1991 〜夢の中にだけ生きて〜)	16 concerts, 9 locations: 8. 6., 8. Niigata City Sangyo Shinko Center (新潟市産業振興センター); 8. 15., 16. Fukuoka Kokusai Center (福岡国際センター); 8. 23. Tokyo Dome; 9. 8., 9. Nippon Gaishi Hall; 9. 14., 15. Osaka-jo Hall; 9. 24. Hiroshima Sun Plaza; 9. 28. Sapporo Makomanai ice rink (真駒内屋内競技場); 10. 5. Morioka ice rink (盛岡市アイスアリーナ); ~~10. 24., 25. Yokohama Arena~~; 11. 12., 13. Yokohama Arena
1991	concert	X Produce: Nani ga okoru ka wakaranai. X ga pavasute o karikitta! (X Produce 〜何が起こるか分からない。Xがパワステを借り切った!)	3 concerts, 1 location: 10. 17., 18., 19. Shinjuku Nissin Power Station (日清パワーステーション)
1991	festival	Extasy Summit 1991	10. 29. Nippon Budōkan
1991	Secret live	Secret Gig	11. 17. Shibuya EGG-MAN
1991	concert	X with Orchestra (X with オーケストラ)	12. 8. NHK Hall
1991	concert	Kore de Saigo ka!? (これで最後か!?) Violence in Jealousy Tour 1991 Final Film Gig Special	12. 20. Nippon Budōkan
1991	festival	All Night Metal party '91 to '92	12. 31. Meguro Rockmaykan (目黒鹿鳴館)
1992	concert	Tokyo Dome 3 Days: On the Verge of Destruction (東京ドーム3DAYS 〜破滅に向かって〜, Tōkyō Dōmu 3 Days ~Hametsu ni Mukatte~)	3 concerts, 1 location: 1. 5., 6., 7. Tokyo Dome
1992	festival	Extasy Summit 1992	2 concerts, 2 locations: 10. 29. Osaka-jo Hall; 10. 31. Nippon Budōkan
1993	Film gig tour	X Japan Film Gigs 1993: Visual Shock Kōgeki saikai (X Japan Film Gigs 1993 〜VISUAL SHOCK 攻撃再開〜)	47 performances, 45 locations: 7. 1. Chōfu-shi Green Hall (調布市グリーンホール); 7. 2. Chiba Prefectural Cultural Centre (千葉県文化会館); 7. 5. Yamanashi Prefecture kultúrház (山梨県立県民文化ホール); 7. 6. Nagano Hokto Cultural Hall (長野県県民文化会館); 7. 7. Nagano Matsumoto Cultural Centre (長野県松本文化会館); 7. 9. Takamatsu-shi minkaikan (高松市民会館); 7. 10. Matsuyama Ehime Prefecture Cultural Centre (愛媛県県民文化会館); 7. 12. Kagoshima Taniyama Southern Hall (谷山サザンホール); 7. 13. Fukuoka Denki Hall (福岡電気ホール); 7. 14. Nagasaki Peace Park Hall of Peace; 7. 16. Kumamoto Prefectural Theatre (熊本県立劇場); 7. 17. Ōita-ken nōgyō kaikan (大分県農業会館); 7. 19. Hiroshima Aster Plaza (広島アステールプラザ); 7. 21. Wakayama-shi minkaikan (和歌山市民会館); 7. 23. Yamagata Prefectural Centre (山形県県民会館); 7. 24., 25. Niigata Phase (新潟フェイズ); 7. 27. Saitama Kaikan (埼玉会館); 7. 28. Toyohashi kinrō fukushi kaikan (豊橋勤労福祉会館); 7. 29. Nagoya-shi minkaikan (名古屋市民会館); 7. 30. Fukui-ken minkaikan (福井県民会館); 8. 2. Kanazawa City House of Culture (金沢市文化ホール); 8. 3. Toyama Centre of Education (富山県教育会館); 8. 5. Ichikawa City Cultural Centre (市川市文化会館); 8. 6. Tochigi Prefectural Integrated Cultural Centre (栃木県総合文化センター); 8. 7. Yokohama Kanagawa Prefecture Cultural Centre (神奈川県民ホール); 8. 8. Atsugi Cultural Centre (厚木市文化会館); 8. 10. Shizuoka Cultural Centre (静岡市民文化会館); 8. 11. Hamamatsu-si minkaikan (浜松市民会館); 8. 12. Kyoto kaikan (京都会館); 8. 13. Nara Prefecture Cultural Centre (奈良県文化会館); 8. 14. Okazaki City House of Culture (岡崎市文化ホール); 8. 16. Shibuya Kōkaidō; 8. 20. Aomori City House of Culture (青森市民文化ホール); 8. 21. Morioka Theatre (盛岡劇場); 8. 22. Akita-ken jidō kaikan (秋田県児童会館); 8. 23. Hirosaki Cultural Centre (弘前文化センター); 8. 25. Sapporo-shi minkaikan (札幌市民会館); 8. 27. Kōriyama Cultural Centre (郡山市民文化センター); 8. 28. Sendai Izumity21; 8. 30. Yokosuka Cultural Centre (横須賀市文化会館); 8. 31. Mito-shi minkaikan (水戸市民会館); 9. 3. Gunma Music Center (群馬音楽センター); 9. 6. Kobe International House; 9. 7., 8. Osaka Sankei Hall (大阪サンケイホール); 9. 10. Yokkaichi Cultural Centre (四日市市文化会館)
1993	Film gig tour	Lawson Special X Japan Film Gigs: Kōgeki saikai (X Japan Film Gigs 〜VISUAL SHOCK 攻撃再開〜)	7 performances, 7 locations: 9. 24. Fukuoka Sunpalace (福岡サンパレス); 9. 28. Sendai Sun Plaza (仙台サンプラザ); 10. 1. Nippon Gaishi Hall; 10. 4. Hiroshima Aster Plaza (広島アステールプラザ); 10. 12. Osaka-jo Hall; 10. 14. Nippon Budōkan; 10. 19. Sapporo-shi minkaikan (札幌市民会館)
1993	concert	Shingata X dai 1-dan Nihon Chokugeki Countdown X Japan Returns (新型エックス第1弾 日本直撃カウントダウン X JAPAN RETURNS)	2 concerts, 1 location: 12. 30., 31. Tokyo Dome
1994	festival	The Great Music Experience	2 concerts, 3 performances, 1 location: 5. 21., 22. Nara, Tōdaiji
1994	concert	Sega Saturn Presents: X Japan Tokyo Dome 2 Days	2 concerts, 1 location: 12. 30., 31. Tokyo Dome
1995	concert	X Japan Presents Kobe Returns	12. 24. Osaka-jo Hall
1995; 1996	tour	Dahlia Tour 1995-1996	11 concerts, 7 locations: 11. 29. Yamagata, Yamagata Sports Hall (山形市総合スポーツセンター); 12. 3., 4. Sapporo Tsukisamu Dome; ~~12. 20, 21. Sendai City Sports Hall (仙台市民体育館)~~; 12. 30., 31. Tokyo Dome; '1996: ~~1. 14. Fukuoka Dome~~; 1. 31. Hiroshima Prefecture Sport Centre (広島県立総合体育館); 2. 7., 8. Niigata City Sangyo Shinko Center (新潟市産業振興センター); 2. 23., 24. Osaka-jo Hall; 3. 13. Nippon Gaishi Hall (Yoshiki is taken to hospital with hernia, tour cancelled); ~~3. 14. Nagoya Rainbow Hall (名古屋レインボーホール)~~; ~~3. 23. Fukuoka Dome~~; ~~3. 27., 28., 30. Yokohama Arena~~
1996	concert	Dahlia Tour Final 1996 Tokyo Dome 2 Days	2 concerts, 1 location: 12. 30., 31. Tokyo Dome
1997	concert	The Last Live: Saigo no Yoru (THE LAST LIVE〜最後の夜〜)	12. 31. Tokyo Dome
2002	Film gig	X Japan Film Gig: X Japan no kiseki (X JAPAN FILM GIG 〜X JAPANの軌跡〜)	12 performances, 11 locations: 1. 13. Ōmiya Sonic City (大宮ソニックシティ); 1. 14. Hiroshima Aster Plaza (広島アステールプラザ); 1. 15. Fukuoka-si minkaikan (福岡市民会館); 1. 16. Osaka kōsei-kin kaikan (大阪厚生金会館); 1. 18. Sapporo-shi minkaikan (札幌市民会館); 1. 20. Sendai Izumity21; 1. 22. Niigata Terrsa (新潟テルサ); 1. 24. Nagoya-si minkaikan (名古屋市民会館); 1. 26., 27. Tokyo International Forum; 2. 3. Cafe Le PSYENCE; 2. 23. Seoul '88 Gymnasium
2002	Film gig	X Japan Film Gig: X Japan no kiseki version 2 (X JAPAN FILM GIG 〜X JAPANの軌跡〜 version 2)	2 performances, 1 location: 4. 20., 21. Tokyo Bay NK Hall
2003	Film gig	X Japan Film Gig '03 featuring Art of Life	9. 21. Nippon Budōkan
2008	concert	X Japan Kōgeki Saikai 2008 I. V.: Hametsu ni Mukatte (X JAPAN 攻撃再開 2008 I.V. 〜破滅に向かって〜)	3 concerts, 1 location: 3. 28., 29., 30. Tokyo Dome
2008	festival	hide memorial summit	5. 4. Ajinomoto Stadium
2008	concert	X Japan Countdown Gig: Ubu ni kaette (X Japan Countdown Gig 〜初心に帰って〜)	12. 31. Akasaka Blitz
2009	concert	X Japan World Tour Live in Hong Kong	2 concerts, 1 location: 1. 16., 17. Hong Kong Asia World Expo
2009	concert	X Japan World Tour Live in Tokyo: Kōgeki zokkō-chuu (X Japan World Tour Live in Tokyo 〜攻撃続行中〜)	2 concerts, 1 location: 5. 2., 3. Tokyo Dome
2009	concert	X Japan World Tour Live in Taipei: Hontōni yaru yoru (X Japan World Tour Live in Taipei 「本当にやる夜」)	5. 30. Taipei Banqiao Stadium (板橋體育場)
2009	Film gig	X Japan Film Gig: Suzuka no yoru (X Japan Film Gig 〜鈴鹿の夜〜)	8. 22. Suzuka Circuit
2010	concert	The Yoshiki Foundation America Kickoff Party	6. 1. Los Angeles Club Nokia
2010	festival	Lollapalooza 2010	8. 8. Chicago Grant Park
2010	concert	X Japan World Tour Live in Yokohama chō kyōkō toppa shichitenhakki: Sekai ni mukatte (X Japan World Tour Live in Yokohama 超強行突破 七転八起 〜世界に向かって〜)	2 concerts, 1 location: 8.14., 15. International Stadium Yokohama
2010	tour	X Japan World Tour Live 2010 North American Tour	7 concerts, 7 locations: 9. 25. Los Angeles Pellissier Building and Wiltern Theater; 9. 28. San Francisco Fox Theatre; 10. 1. Seattle Paramount Theatre; 10. 3. Vancouver Queen Elizabeth Theatre; 10. 6. Chicago Riviera Theatre; 10. 7. Toronto Massey Hall; 10. 10. New York City Roseland Ballroom
2011	festival	Asia Girls Explosion	3. 6. Yoyogi National Gymnasium (国立代々木競技場)
2011	tour	X Japan World Tour Live 2011 European Tour	4 concerts, 4 locations: 6. 28. London Shepherd's Bush Empire; 7. 1. Paris Le Zenith; 7. 2. Utrecht Tivoli; 7. 4. Berlin Columbiahalle
2011	festival	Summer Sonic 2011	2 concerts, 2 locations: 8. 13. Osaka; 8. 14. Chiba Marine Stadium
2011	festival	a-nation 10th Anniversary	8. 27. Tokyo Stadium
2011	tour	X Japan World Tour Live 2011 South American Tour	5 concerts, 5 locations: 9. 9. Santiago de Chile Teatro Caupolicán; 9. 11. São Paulo HSBC Brasil; 9. 14. Buenos Aires Teatro Colegiales; 9. 16. Lima Scencia Hall; 9. 18. Mexico City Circo Volador
2011	tour	X Japan World Tour Live 2011 Southeast Asian Tour	5 concerts, 5 locations: 10. 28. Seoul Olympic Gymnastics Arena; 10. 30. Shanghai Shanghai Indoor Stadium; 11. 4. Hong Kong Asia World-Expo; 11. 6. Taipei World Trade Center Nangang Exhibition Hall; 11. 8. Bangkok Impact Arena
2014	Secret live	Guerilla Live	8. 17. The square in front of Shinjuku Station
2014	concert	X Japan World Tour 2014 at Yokohama Arena	2 concerts, 1 location: 9.30. Yokohama Arena; 10.1. Yokohama Arena
2014	concert	X Japan Live at Madison Square Garden	10. 11. New York City Madison Square Garden
2015	festival	Lunatic Fest.	6. 27. Chiba Makuhari Messe
2015	festival	TV Asahi Dream Festival 2015	11. 23. Yoyogi National Gymnasium
2015	tour	X Japan World Tour 2015-2016 in Japan	10 concerts, 6 locations: 11. 28. Ishinomaki Blue Resistance; 12. 1. Yokohama Arena; 12. 2. Yokohama Arena; 12. 3.Yokohama Arena; 12. 4. Yokohama Arena; 12. 7. Osaka-jo Hall; 12. 9. Fukuoka Convention Center; 12. 11. Hiroshima Prefecture Sports Centre (広島県立総合体育館); 12. 14. Nagoya Nippon Gaishi Hall; 12. 15. Nagoya Nippon Gaishi Hall
2016	festival	Visual Japan Summit 2016	3 concerts, 1 location: 10. 14., 15., 16. Makuhari Messe
2017	concert	X Japan Live 2017 at the Wembley Arena in London	3. 4. London Wembley Arena
2017	tour	X Japan World Tour 2017 We Are X Acoustic Special Miracle: Kiseki no Yoru (～奇跡の夜～) 6 Days	6 concerts, 2 locations: 7. 11. Osaka-jo Hall; 7. 12. Osaka-jo Hall; 7. 14. Yokohama Arena; 7. 15. Yokohama Arena; 7. 16. Yokohama Arena; 7. 17. Yokohama Arena
2018	concert	10th Anniversary of X Japan's Revival X Japan Live 2018 Pre-American Music Festival Appearance Premium Gigs – Yoshiki's Night of Resurrection (XJAPAN復活10周年記念 XJAPANLIVE2018 アメリカフェス出演直前 PREMIUM GIGS 〜YOSHIKI復活の夜〜)	4. 10., 11. Tokyo Zepp Divercity
2018	festival	Coachella	4. 14., 21. California
2018	festival	TV Asahi Dream Festival	9. 15. Chiba Makuhari Messe
2018	concert	X Japan Live Nihon Kōen 2018 ~Kurenai ni Somatta Yoru~ Makuhari Messe 3 Days (X JAPAN Live 日本公演 2018 〜紅に染まった夜〜 Makuhari Messe 3Days)	9. 28., 29., ~~30.~~ Chiba Makuhari Messe

- film gig: projection of a recorded concert in a real concert hall
