= MusiCares COVID-19 Relief Fund =

Relief fund for the COVID-19 pandemic

MusiCares' COVID-19 relief effort was a charitable initiative aimed at providing financial and other forms of assistance to musicians and music industry professionals affected by the COVID-19 pandemic. The initiative was established by MusiCares, a non-profit organization that was founded in 1989 by the Recording Academy, the organization behind the GRAMMY Awards.

== Background ==
The COVID-19 pandemic had a significant impact on the music industry with the closure of concert venues, the cancellation of tours, and the loss of income for many music professionals. MusiCares launched its COVID-19 Relief effort in March 2020 to provide assistance to those in need. The central program was MusiCares' COVID-19 Relief Fund, which was established with $1 million from MusiCares and a $1 million dollar donation from The Recording Academy. MusiCares received further donations from companies and individuals within and outside of the music industry, allowing the organization to distribute $35.7 million in emergency financial assistance and provide over 140,000 services to the music community from March 2020 to July 2022. This includes $27.8 million distributed to support over 34,000 customized care cases, many with basic living needs due to loss of work from COVID-19.

== Goals ==
The goal of the MusiCares' COVID-19 Relief effort was to provide financial assistance to musicians and music industry professionals who have lost income due to the pandemic. The initiative also aimed to provide other forms of assistance, such as medical and mental health support, and to raise awareness of the impact of the pandemic on the music industry.

== Activities ==
MusiCares' COVID-19 Relief effort has provided a range of assistance to musicians and music industry professionals, including:

- Financial assistance: MusiCares distributed Over $24 million in direct emergency financial grants to musicians and music industry professionals who have lost income due to the pandemic. The grants were used to cover basic living expenses.
- Medical assistance: MusiCares partnered with healthcare providers to offer free medical consultations to professionals who are uninsured or underinsured. The organization also provided assistance with medical bills and prescription drug costs.
- Mental Health support: MusiCares provided counseling sessions and support groups to musicians and music industry professionals experiencing anxiety, depression, substance abuse, or other mental health issues due to the pandemic.
- Awareness-raising: MusiCares collaborated with other organizations to raise awareness of the impact of the pandemic on the music industry. The organization also launched a social media campaign, using the hashtag #MusiCaresForUs, to encourage people to support the initiative.

== Funding ==
MusiCares' COVID-19 Relief effort has been funded through donations from individuals and organizations, as well as through partnerships with corporate sponsors. The organization has received support from a range of musicians and organizations:

- Alice in Chains
- Alicia Keys
- All American Rejects
- Amanda Shires
- Andrew Bird
- Ashley McBryde
- Black Pumas
- Bob Weir
- Brandi Carlile
- Camila Cabello
- Chris Stapleton
- Dead & Company
- Deadmau5
- Dirty Projectors
- Dolly Parton
- Father John Misty
- Finneas
- Foo Fighters
- Frank Zappa Trust
- Garth Brooks
- Greta Van Fleet
- Guns N' Roses
- H.E.R.
- Hanson
- Jason Isbell
- Jerry Garcia Foundation
- Jewel
- John Legend
- John Mayer
- John Prine Estate
- Jojo
- Josh Groban
- Katy Perry
- Kenny Rogers
- Lady A
- Lady Gaga
- Leon Bridges
- Luke Combs
- Mandy Moore
- Margo Price
- Marshmello
- Nathanial Rateliff
- Naughty By Nature
- OneRepublic
- PJ Morton
- Ringo Starr
- Rita Wilson
- Sarah Brightman
- Scotty McCreery
- Selena Gomez
- Skip Marley
- Slash
- Sleater-Kinney
- Sofi Tukker
- St. Vincent
- Steve Aoki
- Stevie Nicks
- Styx
- Sublime
- Taylor Swift
- Tedeschi Trucks
- The Lumineers
- The Weeknd
- Thomas Rhett
- Trans-Siberian Orchestra
- Yola
- Yoshiki
- Zac Brown Band

Organizations:

- Amazon Music
- ASCAP
- BMI
- City of Austin
- Country Music Association
- Elma Philanthropies
- Jerry Perenchio Foundation
- Meta
- SESAC
- SONY Music Group
- Spotify
- The Recording Academy
- Tides Foundation
- TikTok Inc.
- Universal Music Group
- Vivid Seats LLC
- Warner Music Group
