= Yoshiki District =

Yoshiki District may refer to:

- Yoshiki District, Gifu
- Yoshiki District, Yamaguchi
