= Hum Haar Nahi Maanenge =

2020 charity single

Single by A. R. Rahman
- Released: 2020

"Hum Haar Nahi Maanenge" is a charity single by A. R. Rahman and Prasoon Joshi in association with HDFC Bank, released in 2020 during the ongoing coronavirus pandemic. Hum Haar Nahi Maanenge is a song of unity, faith and resolution to fight against coronavirus pandemic. This song is an initiative of HDFC Bank to urge people to actively participate in the coronavirus donation drive to support the hugely impacted poor and migrant workers. For every share of this video, HDFC Bank will donate ₹500 to the PM - Cares Fund. At the same time, it pays tribute to the never-give-up attitude of frontline workers such as doctors, police officers, nurses, people feeding stray animal and every individual helping to curb the impact of COVID-19 by putting their life at risk.

The COVID-19 pandemic has resulted in the rise of unemployment due to the adverse impact of coronavirus lockdown on every business, right from the food and beverage industry to finance sector providing a personal loan or car loan. Thereby arising a sense of uncertainty in everyone's mind, and thus Hum Haar Nahi Maanenge comes as a morale booster providing the ray of hope. The song's vocal is by A.R. Rahman, Clinton Cerejo, Mohit Chauhan, Mika Singh, Harshdeep Kaur, Jonita Gandhi, Neeti Mohan, Javed Ali, Sid Sriram, Shruti Haasan, Shashaa Tirupati, Khatija Rahman and Abhay Jodhpurkar.
