= Yoshiki =

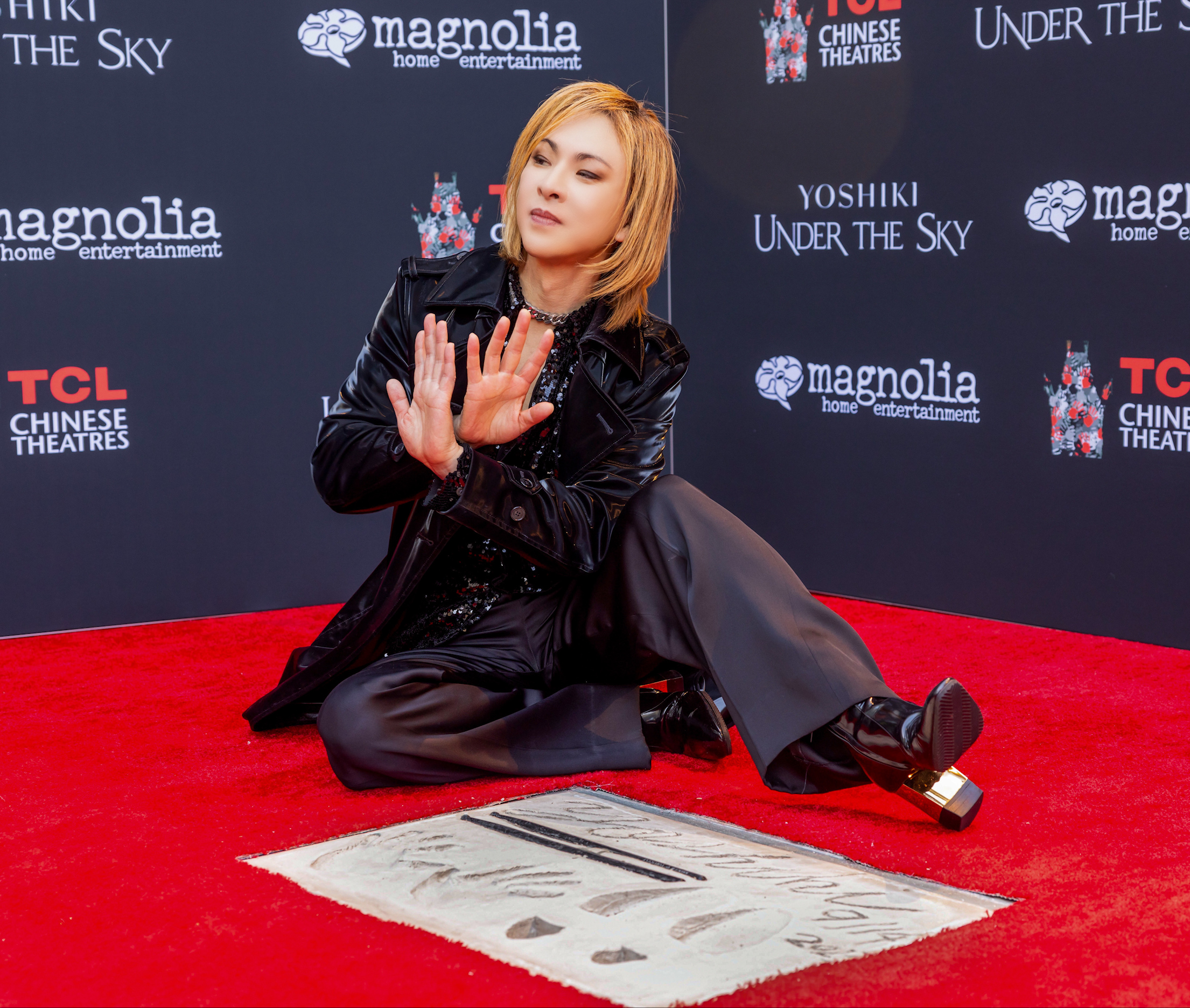
- Yoshiki, Japanese rock star, composer, designer, and philanthropist
- Pronunciation: [joɕiki]
- Gender: Male

Origin
- Origin: Japanese
- Meaning: Different meanings depending on the kanji used

Other names
- Alternative spelling: Yosiki (Kunrei-shiki) Yosiki (Nihon-shiki) Yoshiki (Hepburn)

Yoshiki is a masculine Japanese given name.

== Written forms ==
Yoshiki can be written using many different combinations of kanji characters. Here are some examples:

- 義樹, "justice, tree"
- 義基, "justice, foundation"
- 義機, "justice, opportunity"
- 義起, "justice, to rise"
- 義希, "justice, hope"
- 吉樹, "good luck, tree"
- 吉基, "good luck, foundation"
- 吉機, "good luck, opportunity"
- 吉起, "good luck, to rise"
- 吉希, "good luck, hope"
- 善樹, "virtuous, tree"
- 善基, "virtuous, foundation"
- 善機, "virtuous, opportunity"
- 善起, "virtuous, to rise"
- 善希, "virtuous, hope"
- 芳樹, "virtuous/fragrant, tree"
- 芳基, "virtuous/fragrant, foundation"
- 芳機, "virtuous/fragrant, opportunity"
- 芳起, "virtuous/fragrant, to rise"
- 芳希, "virtuous/fragrant, hope"
- 良樹, "good, tree"
- 良基, "good, foundation"
- 良機, "good, opportunity"
- 慶起, "congratulate, to rise"

The name can also be written in hiragana よしき or katakana ヨシキ.

== Notable people with the name ==
- Yoshiki Hayama (葉山 嘉樹; 1894–1945), Japanese novelist
- Yoshiki Hayashi (林 佳樹; born 1965), better known as Yoshiki, Japanese musician and record producer
- Yoshiki Hiraki (平木 良樹; born 1986), Japanese footballer
- Yoshiki Fujimoto (藤本 佳希; born 1994), Japanese footballer
- Yoshiki Fukuyama (福山 芳樹; born 1963), Japanese singer-songwriter and guitarist
- Yoshiki Kuramoto (蔵本 由紀; born 1940), Japanese physicist
- Yoshiki Matsushita (松下 佳貴; born 1994), Japanese footballer
- Yoshiki Nakai (中井 義樹; born 1983), Japanese footballer
- Yoshiki Nakamura (仲村 佳樹; born 1969), Japanese manga artist
- Yoshiki Oka (岡 佳樹; born 1994), Japanese footballer
- Yoshiki Okamoto (岡本 吉起; born 1961), Japanese video game designer
- Yoshiki Onoda (小野田 嘉幹; born 1925), Japanese film director and screenwriter
- Yoshiki Sakurai (櫻井 圭記; born 1977), Japanese screenwriter
- Yoshiki Sasai (笹井 芳樹; 1962–2014), Japanese biologist
- Yoshiki Sunada (砂田 毅樹; born 1995), Japanese baseball player
- Yoshiki Takahara (高原 宜希; born 1998), Japanese snowboarder
- Yoshiki Takahashi (footballer) (高橋 義希; born 1985), Japanese footballer
- Yoshiki Takaya (高屋 良樹; born 1960), Japanese manga artist
- Yoshiki Tanaka (田中 芳樹; born 1952), Japanese novelist
- Yoshiki Tonogai (外海 良基), Japanese manga artist
- Yoshiki Yamamoto (山本 祥輝; born 1994), Japanese footballer
- Yoshiki Yamashita (山下 芳生; born 1960), Japanese politician

== Fictional characters ==
- Yoshiki Kishinuma (岸沼 良樹), a character in video game Corpse Party
- Yoshiki Tsujinaka (辻中 佳紀), a main character in The Summer Hikaru Died

== See also ==
- Yoshiki District (disambiguation)
- Japanese name
