= Dream Again Tour =

2022 concert tour by Lea Salonga

- Tour by Lea Salonga
- Location: North America; Europe
- Start date: April 6, 2022
- End date: July 1, 2022
- Legs: 2
- No. of shows: 23 in North America 9 in Europe 32 in total

The Dream Again Tour was a two-leg concert tour by Filipina singer Lea Salonga. The tour was titled after her 2020 single, "Dream Again." It was originally intended to run during 2020 under a different headline, but it was postponed in March 2020, shortly after Salonga's performances in Dubai, due to the onset of the COVID-19 pandemic. In May 2020, the tour was once again postponed to Fall 2021. On September 20, 2021, Salonga announced the United Kingdom (UK) leg of the tour, officially named after the 2020 single. The following month, she announced that she would first be touring the United States and Canada in Spring 2022.

The North American leg of the tour officially began on April 6, 2022, in Winnipeg, Manitoba, and ended on May 21, 2022, in Honolulu, Hawaii. After performing at the 2022 National Memorial Day Concert at the West Lawn of the United States Capitol in Washington, D.C., Salonga continued the tour, opening the UK leg on June 18, 2022, in Leicester, England. Salonga concluded the tour on July 1, 2022, in Glasgow, Scotland.

Traveling with her throughout the tour, her four-piece band consisted of Larry Yurman (Music Director/Piano), Paul Viapiano (Guitars), Kevin Axt (Basses), and Ray Brinker (Drums).

== Critical reception ==
The tour received a positive review from Elliot Lanes in BroadwayWorld. While reviewing her performance at the Royal Albert Hall in London, All That Dazzles wrote that "seeing her live is an experience like no other."

== Setlist ==
This setlist is representative of the show in London, performed on June 28, 2022. It does not represent all concerts for the duration of the tour.

=== Overture ===
1. "Lea Salonga Overture"

==== Act 1 ====
1. "Dream Again"
2. "Time After Time / Here You Come Again"
3. "Move On / Not While I'm Around"
4. "It's Quiet Uptown"
5. "For Forever"
6. "Photograph"
7. "Imagine"
8. "Bring Him Home"

==== Act 2 ====
1. "Waiting for Life"
2. "Somewhere"
3. "Maybe This Time"
4. "Written in Stone"
5. "Toxic"
6. "Happy Days Are Here Again"
7. "Greatest Hits Medley (I'd Give My Life For You / A Whole New World / Reflection / On My Own / I Dreamed a Dream / The Human Heart)"
8. "Dynamite"

==== Encore ====
1. "How Far I'll Go"
2. "Back for Good / MMMBop / Tearin' Up My Heart / I Want It That Way / My Love / What Makes You Beautiful"

== Shows ==
List of concerts, showing date, city, country, and venue
Date (2022)	City	Country	Venue
North America
April 6	Winnipeg	Canada	Club Regent Event Centre
April 8	Calgary	Canada	Jack Singer Concert Hall
April 10	Enoch	Canada	River Cree Casino & Resort
April 12	Vancouver	Canada	Queen Elizabeth Theatre
April 13	Beaverton	United States	Patricia Reser Center for the Arts
April 15	Lancaster	United States	Lancaster Performing Arts Center
April 16	Cerritos	United States	Cerritos Center
April 20	New York City	United States	The Town Hall
April 22	Chicago	United States	Copernicus Center
April 23	North Bethesda	United States	Music Center at the Strathmore
April 25	North Little Rock	United States	Center for Humanities and Arts at UA Pulaski Tech
April 29	Indianapolis	United States	Hilbert Circle Theatre
April 30	Indianapolis	United States	Hilbert Circle Theatre
May 5	Scottsdale	United States	Scottsdale Center for the Performing Arts
May 7	Las Vegas	United States	Encore Theater at Wynn Las Vegas
May 8	Las Vegas	United States	Encore Theater at Wynn Las Vegas
May 10	Livermore	United States	Bankhead Theater
May 11	Livermore	United States	Bankhead Theater
May 13	Brooks	United States	Cache Creek Casino Resort
May 15	Modesto	United States	Gallo Center for the Arts
May 17	San Diego	United States	The Rady Shell at Jacobs Park
May 20	Honolulu	United States	Neal S. Blaisdell Center
May 21	Honolulu	United States	Neal S. Blaisdell Center
Europe
June 18	Leicester	England	De Montfort Hall
June 19	Southampton	England	Mayflower Theatre
June 21	Cardiff	Wales	St. David's Hall
June 23	Birmingham	England	Symphony Hall
June 24	Manchester	England	Bridgewater Hall
June 26	Brighton	England	Brighton Dome
June 28	London	England	Royal Albert Hall
June 29	Canterbury	England	The Marlowe Theatre
July 1	Glasgow	Scotland	Glasgow Royal Concert Hall
