= Dream Again (song) =

2020 song by Lea Salonga

Single by Lea Salonga
- Released: August 21, 2020
- Recorded: 2020
- Genre: Pop
- Length: 3:16
- Composer: Daniel Edmonds
- Lyricists: Blair Bodine; Daniel Edmonds
- Producer: Daniel Edmonds

"Dream Again" is a song by Filipina singer Lea Salonga. It was released as a single on August 21, 2020. The song was written by Daniel Edmonds and Blair Bodine.

The single was released to raise funds for charities aiding in relief from the COVID-19 pandemic around the world, including The Actors Fund. The single later inspired the title for Salonga's 2022 tour by the same name.

== Composition and lyrics ==
"Dream Again" runs for a total duration of three minutes and sixteen seconds (3:16). Lyrically, the song discusses the ups and downs of each day and overcoming the troubles of lockdowns during the COVID-19 pandemic. Salonga's vocals for the song range from G_{3} to E_{5}, with E_{5} in both head voice and chest mix.

== Critical reception ==
The single received positive reviews and critics and fans alike. It was called an "inspiring anthem" by Ali Stagnitta of Hollywood Life and Andrew Gans, Ryan McPhee, and Dan Meyer of Playbill. The song was also described as "an uplifting song about fulfilling one's dreams" by ABS-CBN.

== Music video ==
The music video for "Dream Again" premiered on Salonga's official YouTube channel alongside the release of the single. It begins with a photograph of Salonga holding a sign that reads "Send me your dreams using #LSdreamagain." The video then visualizes Salonga singing in her home in Manila alongside background vocalists Mat Verevis and Elandrah Feo, pianist Daniel Edmonds, guitarist Paul Viapiano, and drummer Joe Accaria. Throughout the video, images of various people are shown holding signs with their written responses. The responses included hopes of seeing their loved ones, traveling, returning to school, and performing on stage. The video was produced by Marathon Digital. The video has been viewed more than 50,000 times.

== Performances ==
Almost one year after the song's release, Salonga first performed the song at the second edition NF Hope Concert livestream event on May 2, 2021. Salonga performed the song virtually for a second time at Time's Uplifting AAPI Voices Summit on May 27, 2021. This solo version included less emphasis on instruments and background vocals.

The first live performance was on April 6, 2022, in Winnipeg, Manitoba during the Dream Again Tour. The arrangement began with a slower tempo than the original release before picking up with the entrance of drums and bass guitar. Some performances of the song included a live orchestral accompaniment. Salonga included the song in the setlist for the entire 32-show international tour.

== Credits and personnel ==
Credits adapted from the official music video on YouTube.

- Lea Salonga – vocals
- Daniel Edmonds – composing, lyrics, production, piano
- Blair Bodine – lyrics
- Paul Viapiano – guitar
- Joe Accaria – drums
- Ben Cohn – production
- Mat Verevis – background vocals
- Elandrah Feo – background vocals
- Christopher Hewitt – production, mixing

== See also ==
- Lea Salonga discography
