= På spåret =

Swedish TV game show

- Genre: Game show
- Created by: Ingvar Oldsberg, Lennart Andersson
- Presented by: Ingvar Oldsberg (1987–2009); Kristian Luuk (2009–)
- Judges: Lennart Dahlgren (1988); Björn Hellberg (1995–2003, 2005–2009); Carl Jan Granqvist (2004); Fredrik Lindström ( (2009–)
- Theme music composer: Bengt-Åke Andersson (1987–2010); Augustifamiljen (2010–2019); Various artists (2019–)
- Country of origin: Sweden
- Original language: Swedish
- No. of seasons: 28
- No. of episodes: 291

Production
- Production location: Sweden
- Running time: 59 minutes

Original release
- Network: SVT
- Release: 5 September 1987 – present

Related
- Jorda rundt

På spåret (lit. 'On the Right Track') is a popular Swedish TV game show series broadcast on SVT since 5 September 1987. The show, which is intended to be humorous yet educational, has remained one of the most popular TV shows in Sweden, attracting an average of 2,150,000 viewers during the 2007 season. The all-time record was set in March 1990, when 3.7 million people tuned in to see the show. This means that nearly half of all Swedes saw the game show.

På spåret is an original format developed by Ingvar Oldsberg for SVT, and he hosted the show for many years. The first show aired 5 September 1987. Lennart Dahlgren, winner of the first season, was the judge in 1988. Author and tennis legend Björn Hellberg was promoted from contestant to permanent Oldsberg sidekick and judge in 1995 after winning for four straight seasons. Famous gourmet, restaurant owner, and former contestant Carl Jan Granqvist sat in for Hellberg during the 2004 season.

In 2009, after 21 years, Oldsberg and Hellberg left, and Kristian Luuk took over as host with Fredrik Lindström as judge.

== Format ==
Two teams of well-known Swedes (during the initial seasons each team had three participants each, however this was later reduced to two) compete against each other. Participants are shown filmed journeys (usually filmed from the front of a train, but occasionally from a car, or even from a plane) and the objective is for each team to identify the destination of the journey, using visual clues from the video, and additional clues from the host. The clues, which often include puns and far-fetched word play, get progressively easier as the train approaches its destination, and the number of points awarded for a correct answer accordingly declines. After the journey both teams answer questions related to the destination city, and collect more points.

Each one-hour show has three filmed journeys, typically with one Swedish and two foreign destinations.

The journey involves the competitors figuring out the destination of a journey viewed at high speed from the driver's seat on a train (sometimes also a car, bus or boat) on the way to the place in question. The host reads out various tricky clues, as the journey progresses. Clues are awarded on 10, 8, 6, 4 and 2 points, and get progressively easier (2 points almost always includes a pun on the name of the destination). To answer, the team pulls the emergency brake; if the answer is correct, points are given corresponding to the level that the journey has reached. The other team must wait until the next point level to give their answer.

In between journeys 2 and 3, the original hosts, Oldsberg and Hellberg, used to read a text dressed up as Dr. Watson and Sherlock Holmes, giving progressively easier clues about a specific celebrity. The team that first identified the celebrity won points, or instead lost if the answer was wrong. Later "Holmes and Watson" was substituted by "Tintin and Captain Haddock". Following the 50th anniversary of SVT in 2006, this element was replaced by various mini-games, as follows:

- Retur (lit. 'Return') – the contestants must guess which is the correct year, based on films and pictures taken from SVT's archive. The correct answer gets three points while the wrong answer gives three minus points. Only the team that pulled the emergency brake first can answer. This section was added in connection with SVT's 50th anniversary.
- Vem där? (lit. 'Who's There?') replaced Retur 2010–11. Instead of a year, movies and pictures are clues linked to a famous person.
- Listan (lit. 'the List') was a new element from the 2016–17 season, replacing Vem där?. The team with the lowest score could choose between two subjects (e.g., European capitals or footballers born in the 1970s). Both teams must then decide which four of the eight answer proposals belong to the chosen topic, and then lock their answers by pulling the brake. Three points go to the team that scores the four correct answers. If both teams answered correctly, it is the competitors who pull the 'brake' first who get the points. Listan disappeared after the 2018–19 season.
- From the 2019–20 season, the team that was behind after two journeys could choose between Vem där? and Retur.
- Närmast vinner (lit. 'Nearest Wins') replaced Vem där? and Retur for the 2021 season. In this mini-game, the team gets to see a film that connects to a place, somewhere in the world. The team that comes closest to marking the place on a blank map gets three points – like a geographical 'pin the tail on the donkey'.

=== Tournament ===
In recent years, each season have consisted of a tournament with three groups of three teams each. The winner of each group qualify for the semi-finals; the fourth semi-finalist is decided by a quarter-final match between the two best teams that placed second in their respective groups. Starting from the 2024–25 season, the format changed to two groups of four teams, where the top two teams in each group qualify for the semi-finals.

== Contestants ==
Until 1995, each team consisted of three people, since then the contestants have competed in pairs. The show typically feature intelligent, humorous and well-known celebrities, such as TV-host Lotta Bromé, restaurateur Carl-Jan Granqvist, former weight-lifter Lennart Dahlgren, comedians/TV-hosts Filip & Fredrik, Olympic high-jump champion Stefan Holm, actor/TV personality Peter Harryson and sports journalist Johanna Frändén.

=== Contestants 2007–08 ===
Group 1

- Caroline af Ugglas & Göran Hägg
- Anne Lundberg & Johan Wester
- Cecilia Hagen & Lennart Dahlgren

Group 2

- Ann-Marie Skarp & Jan Guillou
- Filip Hammar & Fredrik Wikingsson
- Kristina Kappelin & Kjell Bergqvist

Group 3

- Pernilla Månsson Colt & Hans Mosesson
- Karin Hübinette & Stefan Holm
- Pia Conde & Thomas Petersson

=== Contestants 2008–09 ===
Group A

- Fredrik Lindström & Peter Apelgren
- Mari Jungstedt & Rickard Olsson
- Lisa Syrén & Johan Wester

Group B

- Zinat Pirzadeh & Göran Greider
- Filip Hammar & Fredrik Wikingsson
- Jessika Gedin & Hans Rosenfeldt

Group C

- Tina Ahlin & Marcus Birro
- Camilla Lundberg & Robert Aschberg
- Siw Malmkvist & David Bexelius

=== Contestants 2009–10 ===
Group A

- Alexandra Charles & Björn Ranelid
- Hélène Benno & Peter Apelgren
- Doreen Månsson & Hans Rosling

Group B

- Jessika Gedin & Hans Rosenfeldt
- Johanna Koljonen & Marcus Birro
- Jessica Zandén & Philip Zandén

Group C

- Vanna Rosenberg & Göran Rosenberg
- Filip Hammar & Fredrik Wikingsson
- Lena Sundström & Bo Sundström

=== Contestants 2012–13 ===
Group A

- Caroline af Ugglas & Göran Hägg
- Johanna Koljonen & Marcus Birro
- Ellinor Persson & Dick Harrison

Group B

- Cecilia Hagen & Lennart Dahlgren
- Martina Haag & Erik Haag
- Carina Lidbom & Tommy Engstrand

Group C

- Lotta Bromé & Carl Jan Granqvist
- Stefan Holm & Katarina Mazetti
- Jessika Gedin & Hans Rosenfeldt

=== Contestants 2013–14 ===
Group A

- Eric Ericson & Kjell Wilhelmsen
- Ann-Marie Skarp & Jan Guillou
- Helena von Zweigbergk & Göran Everdahl

Group B

- Martina Montelius & Dominika Peczynski
- Morgan Larsson & Christer Lundberg
- Ylva Hällen & Anna Charlotta Gunnarson

Group C

- Martina Thun & Ulf Danielsson
- Helen Alfredsson & Christian Olsson
- Elisabet Höglund & Jesper Rönndahl

=== Contestants 2014–15 ===
Group A

- Louise Epstein & Thomas Nordegren
- Filip Hammar & Fredrik Wikingsson
- Helena von Zweigbergk & Göran Everdahl

Group B

- Jason Diakité & Lina Thomsgård
- Gudrun Schyman & K. G. Hammar
- Martina Thun & Ulf Danielsson

Group C

- Eric Ericson & Kjell Wilhelmsen
- Elisabet Höglund & Jesper Rönndahl
- Jenny Strömstedt & Niklas Strömstedt

== Past winners ==
| Season | Winner | Runners-up |
|---|---|---|
| 1987 | Lennart Dahlgren, Margareta Söderström & Thomas Wernerson | |
| 1988 | Björn Hellberg, Mats Strandberg & Bengt Grive | |
| 1990 | Björn Hellberg, Mats Strandberg & Joakim Nyström | Margareta Söderström, Lennart Dahlgren & Thomas Wernerson |
| 1991 | Björn Hellberg, Mats Strandberg & Bengt Grive | Putte Wickman, Birgit Carlstén & Lennart Broström |
| 1993 | Björn Hellberg, Mats Strandberg & Bengt Grive | Lasse Strömstedt, Inger Nilsson & Kicki Hultin |
| 1995 | Cecilia Hagen & Tomas Tengby | Peter Harryson & Eva Bysing |
| 1996 | Tommy Engstrand & Birgit Carlstén | Bengt Järnblad & Ma Oftedal |
| 1997 | Peter Harryson & Malin Peterson | Adde Malmberg & Cecilia Hagen |
| 1998 | Carl Jan Granqvist & Lotta Bromé | Lasse Eriksson & Ulrika Knutson |
| 1999 | Peter Harryson & Carina Lidbom | Birgit Carlstén & Sven Melander |
| 2000 | Agneta Bolme Börjefors & Adde Malmberg | Birgit Carlstén & Sven Melander |
| 2001 | Annette Kullenberg & Jesper Aspegren | Lotta Bromé & Carl Jan Granqvist |
| 2002 | Carina Lidbom & Tommy Engstrand | Cecilia Hagen & Lennart Dahlgren |
| 2003 | Ingela Agardh & Stefan Holm | Cecilia Hagen & Lennart Dahlgren |
| 2004 | Ellinor Persson & Dick Harrison | Ingela Agardh & Stefan Holm |
| 2005–06 | Katarina Mazetti & Stefan Holm | Adde Malmberg & Magdalena Forsberg |
| 2006–07 | Caroline af Ugglas & Göran Hägg | Anne Lundberg & Johan Wester |
| 2007–08 | Anne Lundberg & Johan Wester | Cecilia Hagen & Lennart Dahlgren |
| 2008–09 | Lisa Syrén & Johan Wester | Jessika Gedin & Hans Rosenfeldt |
| 2009–10 | Johanna Koljonen & Marcus Birro | Hélène Benno & Peter Apelgren |
| 2010–11 | Peter Apelgren & Hélène Benno | Martina Haag & Erik Haag |
| 2011–12 | Martina Haag & Erik Haag | Niklas Strömstedt & Jenny Strömstedt |
| 2012–13 | Ellinor Persson & Dick Harrison | Cecilia Hagen & Lennart Dahlgren |
| 2013–14 | Helena von Zweigbergk & Göran Everdahl | Elisabet Höglund & Jesper Rönndahl |
| 2014–15 | Elisabet Höglund & Jesper Rönndahl | Fredrik Wikingsson & Filip Hammar |
| 2015–16 | Elisabet Höglund & Jesper Rönndahl | Anna Ekström & Göran Hägglund |
| 2016–17 | Johan Hilton & Kristin Lundell | Isobel Hadley-Kamptz & Kalle Lind |
| 2017–18 | Josefin Johansson & Johar Bendjelloul | Amie Bramme Sey & Gunnar Bolin |
| 2018–19 | Parisa Amiri & Gunnar Wetterberg | Eric Ericson & Kjell Wilhelmsen |
| 2019–20 | Parisa Amiri & Gunnar Wetterberg | Josefin Johansson & Johar Bendjelloul |
| 2020–21 | Magdalena Forsberg & Claes Elfsberg | Louise Epstein & Thomas Nordegren |
| 2021–22 | Cecilia Düringer & Jonatan Unge | Hanna Hellquist & Ina Lundström |
| 2022–23 | Marie Agerhäll & Fritte Fritzson | Cecilia Düringer & Jonatan Unge |
| 2023–24 | Marie Agerhäll & Fritte Fritzson | Peter Apelgren & Hector Apelgren |
| 2024-25 | Peter Apelgren & Hector Apelgren | Gry Forssell & Jonas Rhodiner |
| 2025-26 | Kirsty Armstrong & Hanna Lublin Niklasson | Hanna Hellquist & Ina Lundström |

Some of the participants have been celebrities in Sweden, more due to this show, than for anything they were before. This applies especially for the former weightlifter Lennart Dahlgren. Although far from unknown before his first participation, his celebrity rose quite a lot due to his geographical knowledge. But also Björn Hellberg, Carl Jan Granqvist, Johanna Koljonen are included among the ones who perhaps are more associated with this television show than anything else, at the time and to the general public at least.

== Musicians ==
Music questions are presented by well-known musicians. In 2023 these were:

- Programs 1–3, Segment host: Jill and the Johnsons; Guest artists: Alba August, Maja Francis and Moonica Mac.
- Programs 4–6, Segment host: Kaah; Guest artists: Danny Saucedo, Skott and Melissa Horn.
- Programs 7–9, Segment host: Johnossi; Guest artists: Victor Leksell, Maxida Märak and Pelle Almqvist
- Programs 10–13, Segment host: Infinite Mass; Guest artists: Sabina Ddumba, Janice, Amanda Ginsburg and Miriam Bryant.

== International adaptations ==
The format was sold to the Norwegian Broadcasting Corporation, where the show was called Jorda rundt (Around the World). It was canceled after only one season (1998–99).

The Finnish version Hengaillaan, produced by YLE, started in 2023. Its fourth season started in 2026.
