= Björn Hellberg =

Swedish journalist (born 1944)

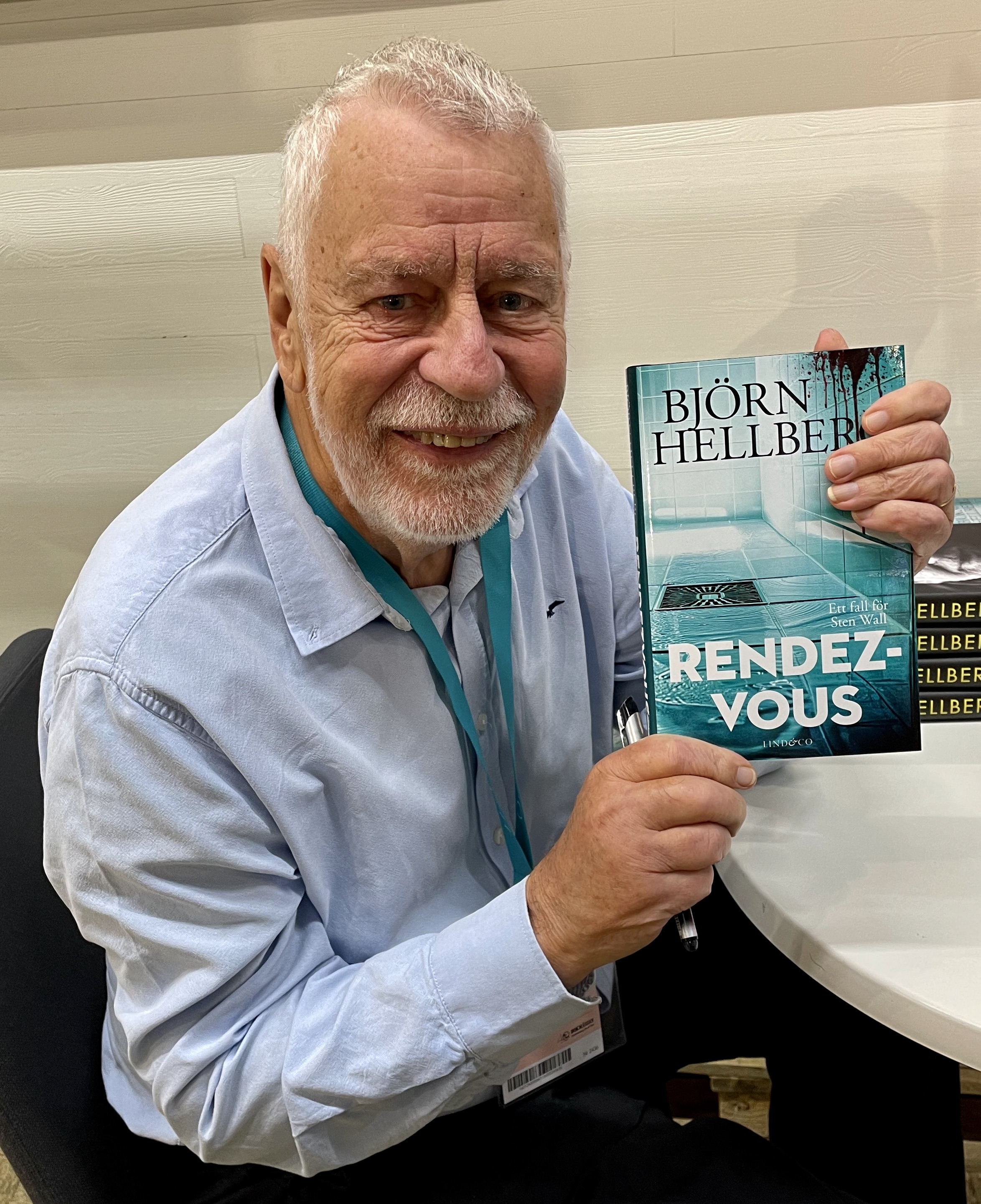
- Björn Hellberg at the Gothenburg Book Fair in September 2024
- Born: 4 August 1944 (age 82); Borås, Sweden
- Occupations: Sports journalist, writer

Björn Hellberg (born 4 August 1944) is a Swedish sports journalist, author, tennis oracle and TV personality, best known as co-host and referee of the television show På spåret.

He was born in Borås, Sweden, but his family soon moved to Laholm.

Although he participated as a competitor during the early years of På spåret, later (in the team in which Bengt Grive and Mats Strandberg also participated), he turned out to be an "oracle" in all possible subjects outside tennis, his absolute favorite subject. Together with his friend, the equally esteemed Swedish television celebrity Ingvar Oldsberg, Hellberg has participated in many other television programmes.

During the Winter Olympics 1992 in Albertville, Hellberg and Oldsberg became a television pair who were so impressed by the Norwegian successes there, that they gave each other Norwegian names and told the viewers that they had to emigrate and become Norwegians, in a playful tone. Oldsberg gave Hellberg the Norwegian name "Hellbakken". Hellberg lives in Laholm and has also become an honorary citizen of this town in Halland, Sweden, where a street has been named after him – Hellbakken, the nickname Oldsberg had given him during the 1992 Winter Olympics.

Hellberg is also an author of several crime novels, initially inspired by Stieg Trenter, some of which have been translated to other languages.

In 2011, Hellberg became a Hall of Fame member at Svenska Tennismuséet, in Båstad He has at several occasions expressed sympathies for Sunderland FC. He is sometimes seen at Örjans Vall watching Halmstad BK (and also Laholm's own small club at home).

== Partial bibliography ==
- "Gråt i mörker" (1981)
- "Födde: en dotter" (1988)
- "Dråpslaget" (1992)
- "Rovlystnad" (1993)
- "Inte önskvärd" (1994)
- "Slutkört" (1995)
- "Då dagboken dog" (1996)
- "Gräddhyllan" (1997)
- "Förhäxad" (1998)
- "Hedersmord" (1998), (In Dutch, "Eremoord")
- "Panelhönan" (1999), (In Dutch, "Voyeur")
- "Misstaget" (2000)
- "Tacksägelsen" (2000)
- "Hotelldöd" (2001)
- "Den grå" (2001)
- "Funny Fanny" (2002)
- "Paria" (2003)
- "Karaoke" (2004)
- "Dominans" (2005)
- "Dödslängtan" (2006)
- "Trofésamlaren" (2007)
- "Nattvandraren" (2008)
- "Den flerfaldige mördaren" (2010)
- "Sankte Per" (2012)
- "Skarprättaren" (2012)
- "Skumrask" (2013)
- "De tysta" (2014)
- "De hatiska" (2015)
- "Dödsdrycken" (2016)
- "Likspett" (2017)
- "Narrspegel" (2020)
- "Lastbart" (2021)
- "Vena Amoris" (2022)
- "Den ultimata stölden" (2023)
- "Rendezvous" (2024)
