= Carl Jan Granqvist =

Swedish food art professor

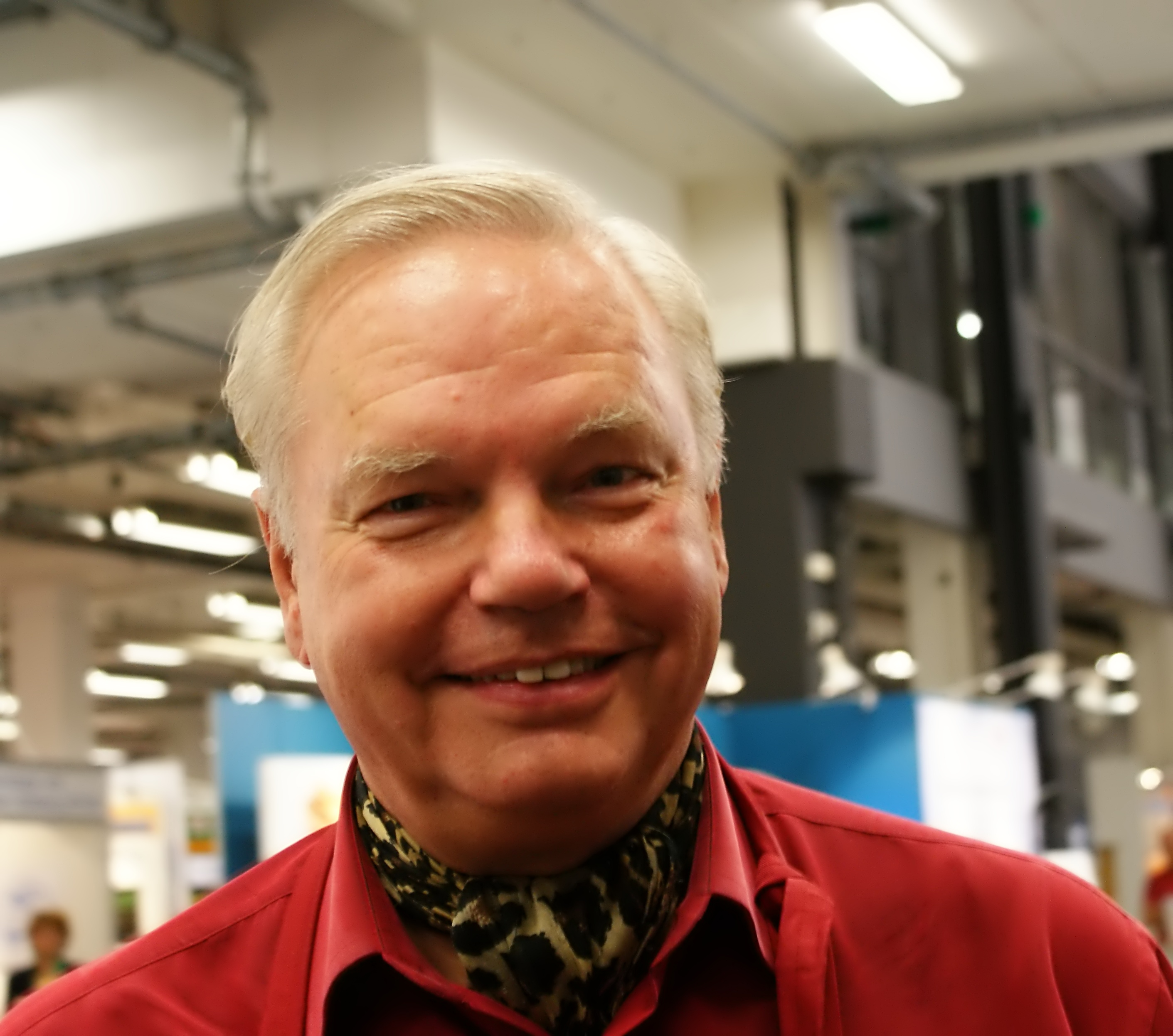
- Carl Jan Granqvist (2010)
- Born: 22 March 1946 (age 79); Örebro, Sweden

Carl Jan Erik Granqvist (born 22 March 1946), is a Swedish restaurateur, food and wine connoisseur and television personality, as well as professor in the art of food at the Norsk hotellhøgskole in Stavanger, which is part of the University of Stavanger. He studied art history at Stockholm University between 1967 and 1968. Between 1969 and 1970, he studied at Virginska restaurangskolan, a restaurant school, in Örebro. He has also done an internship at Operakällaren between 1970 and 1972.

Carl Jan Granqvist became the kellermeister of Grythyttans gästgivaregård in 1972 and was later responsible for creating Måltidens hus and the Restaurant school in Grythyttan. He was a pioneer in Sweden with the sapere method which means that the composition of a meal not only considers the taste but also the other senses of the guest. He was the founder of Vinkällaren Grappe at Östermalm in Stockholm, the first commercial wine storage facility of its kind in Sweden, which started its business in 1986.

He has participated in several TV shows since his debut in 1983 on SVT with the wine tasting show Levande livet. He has also competed in the show På spåret along with Lotta Bromé on several occasions and they won the 1998 season. He was also co-host for the show between 2004 and 2005 along with Ingvar Oldsberg. In 2006, he hosted the show Carl Jans änglar on TV3. The same year he was a guest on the Kanal 5 show Boston Tea Party hosted by Filip and Fredrik. In 2009, he was a celebrity dancer in Let's Dance broadcast on TV4.

Granqvist is a member of the Swedish Freemasons Order. In his autobiographic book Människan, mötena, måltiden, Granqvist revealed that he is bisexual.
