= Göran Everdahl =

Swedish journalist and film critic

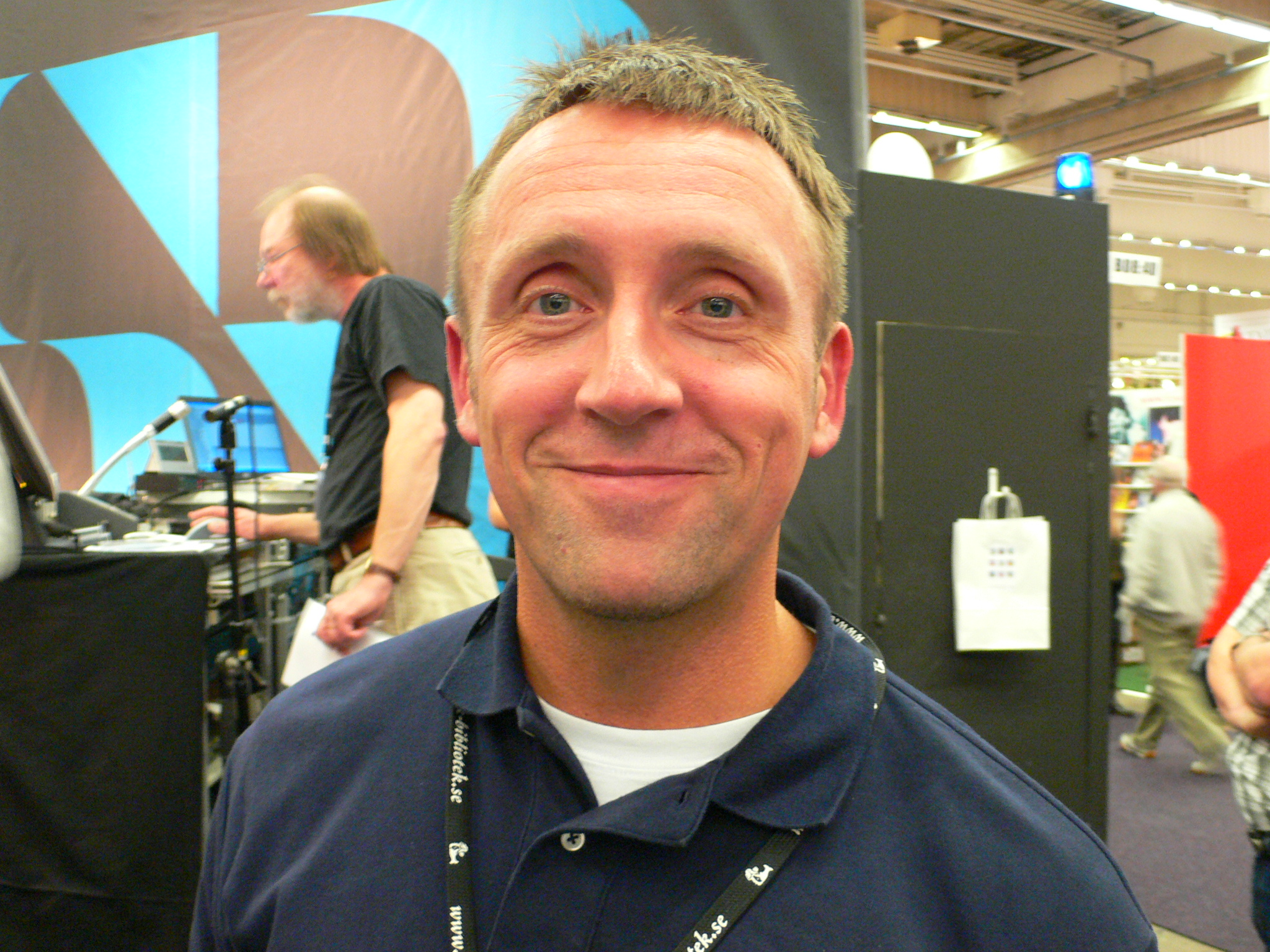
- Everdahl in 2007
- Born: 11 November 1964 (age 61); Piteå, Sweden
- Occupations: Journalist, author
- Known for: Spanarna, Filmkrönikan

Arne Göran Eli Everdahl (born 11 November 1964) is a Swedish journalist and film critic. He writes columns and discusses film both on radio and television. Everdahl is mostly known for his appearances on the panel for the Sveriges Radio show Spanarna. In 2006, Everdahl was awarded the Swedish Comics Academy's honorary diploma for his journalistic contributions to comics. Everdahl has throughout the years participated in radio and TV, and magazines and book.

== Biography ==
Everdahl was born in Piteå, Sweden.

In the early 1990s, he appeared on the show Dabrowski presented by Stina Dabrowski in duo along with Calle Norlén as they were both from the city of Umeå, they did conversations and presented satirical short films. He has also been a film critic on shows like Filmkrönikan, Gomorron Sverige and Go'kväll. He has written several book such as Tvål! Kärlek, svek och härligt hat på teve in 1998, and Bildningsakuten: bli expert på 5 minuter. Everdahl has written a cultural history book about the word lagom.

In February 2014, he participated in the SVT show På spåret along with Helena von Zweigbergk.
