= Lisa Syrén Jardbrink =

Swedish journalist and radio presenter

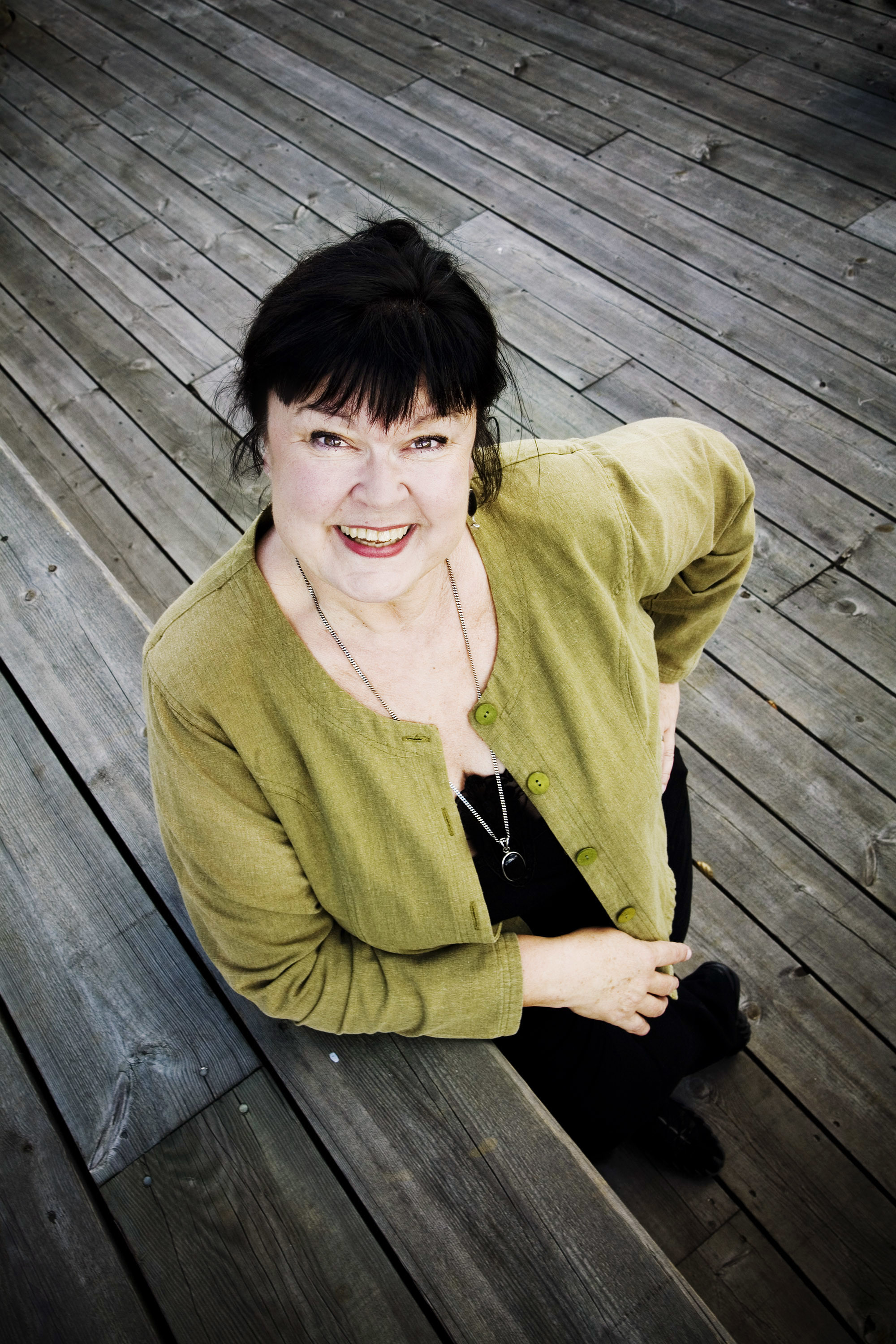
- Born: Lisa Syrén; 4 August 1955 (age 70)
- Occupations: Journalist, presenter
- Employer: Sveriges Radio
- Known for: Karlavagnen; Ring så spelar vi
- Spouse: Mikael Jardbrink (married 2012–present)
- Awards: Winner of På spåret (2008–09)

Lisa Syrén Jardbrink (née Syrén; born 1955) is a Swedish journalist and presenter at Sveriges Radio since 1986. She works at Sveriges Radio Kronoberg in Växjö and since 1996 has been the presenter for Ring så spelar vi on Sveriges Radio P4.

Syrén was the presenter for the very first Karlavagnen on 18 January 1993, a show she created together with her coworker Bengt Grafström. Syrén chose to leave Karlavagnen in 2008. Since then she has only been working with Ring så spelar vi.

Syrén won the 2008–09 season of the SVT show På spåret, teamed with Johan Wester.

During the summer 2012, she moved to Karlskrona to her boyfriend Mikael Jardbrink. On 17 December 2012 they got married at the Karlskrona rådhus.
