= Anne Lundberg =

Swedish television presenter and journalist

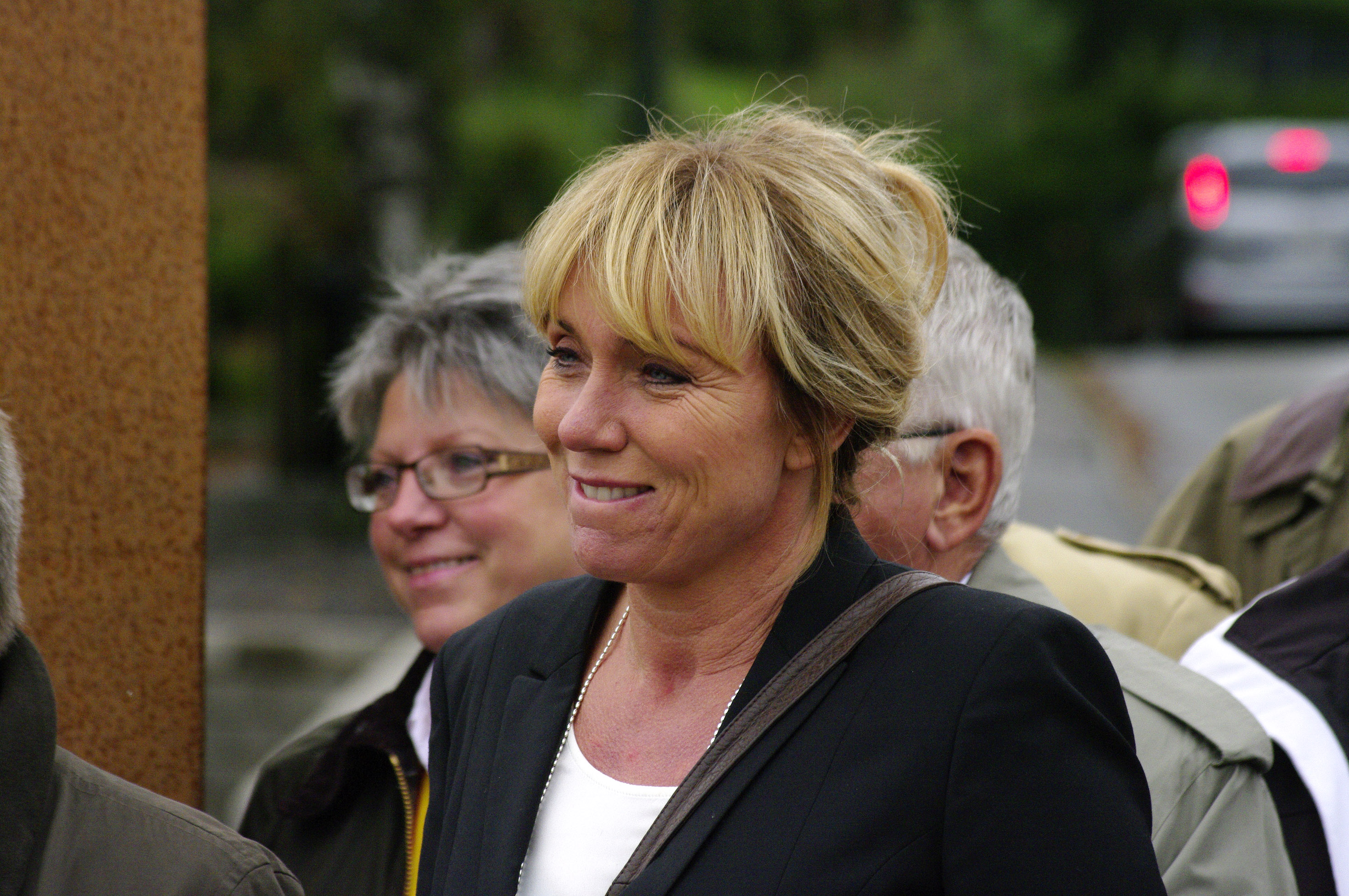
- Anne Lundberg (2012)
- Born: 29 March 1966 (age 59); Skurup, Sweden
- Occupation: Television presenter

Anne Ebba-Karin Lundberg (born 29 March 1966) is a Swedish television presenter and journalist. She has presented several shows on the Swedish television station SVT and she has won the Kristallen award three times in the category for "Best female presenter of the year". She has also won one season of På spåret.

== Career ==
Lundberg started her journalistic work after studying journalism, at the newspaper Arbetaren in Gothenburg.

Lundberg has presented the television shows Antikrundan, Landgång, Himlen kan vänta, and En andra chans. In 2001, she did a segment called "Malmö på glid" for Uppdrag Granskning which received a lot of attention. During 2007, she hosted Plus at SVT, and in December of the same year she was the Christmas host for SVT's Christmas Eve annual show.

She has successfully participated in På spåret along with the comedian Johan Wester during the seasons 2006 to 2008. The duo won the 2008 season of the show. Lundberg has won the award for "Best female television presenter" at the Kristallen award three times in 2008, 2010 and 2011. In 2011, she presented Här är ditt kylskåp at SVT.

Lundberg was a celebrity guest at Sommarvärden 2004 at Sveriges Radio station P1 on 21 June 2004.
