= Ingela Agardh =

Swedish journalist and television presenter

- Agardh in the mid-80s
- Born: Ingela Gunnel Elisabeth Mothander; 27 October 1948; Sundsvall, Sweden
- Died: 17 June 2008 (aged 59); Malmköping, Sweden
- Resting place: Lilla Malma Skogskyrkogård; 59.134453°N 16.726564°E
- Occupations: Journalist television presenter, personality
- Employer: Sveriges Television
- Notable work: Aktuellt
- Spouse: Veijo Agardh (1982–2008)
- Children: 1

Ingela Agardh (27 October 1948 – 17 June 2008) was a Swedish journalist and television presenter.

== Biography ==
She was born Ingela Gunnel Elisabeth Mothander on 27 October 1948 in Sundsvall, Sweden. Before becoming a journalist, she worked at a mental hospital. She graduated 1970 from journalism school in Gothenburg and became a journalist in 1971 for Sveriges Radio in Sundsvall, 1979 at Radio Göteborg and Sundsvall again in 1979.

In 1980 she became a studio reporter and news anchor for Sveriges Televisions Aktuellt. She was a presenter for Hemma and made frequent appearances as a host for Gomorron Sverige (on Sveriges Television), and participated as a contestant in the quiz show På spåret where she and Stefan Holm won in 2003. In her book Den största nyheten (2008) she wrote about her newfound Christian beliefs.

== Death ==
During the summer of 1987 she was diagnosed with breast cancer. She died of the disease on 17 June 2008 in Malmköping at age 59.

== Personal life ==
The daughter of civil engineer Arne Mothander and his wife, Gunnel (née Markstrom), she married Veijo Agardh on 15 April 1982. They had one child, a daughter named Charlotta.

== Filmography ==
- 1995 – Som krossat glas i en hårt knuten hand (as herself)
- 2001 – Reuter & Skoog (TV-series; as herself; one episode)

== Bibliography ==
- Agardh, Ingela (2008). Den största nyheten. ISBN 9789173870320.
