= Birgit Carlstén =

Swedish actress and singer (1949–2025)

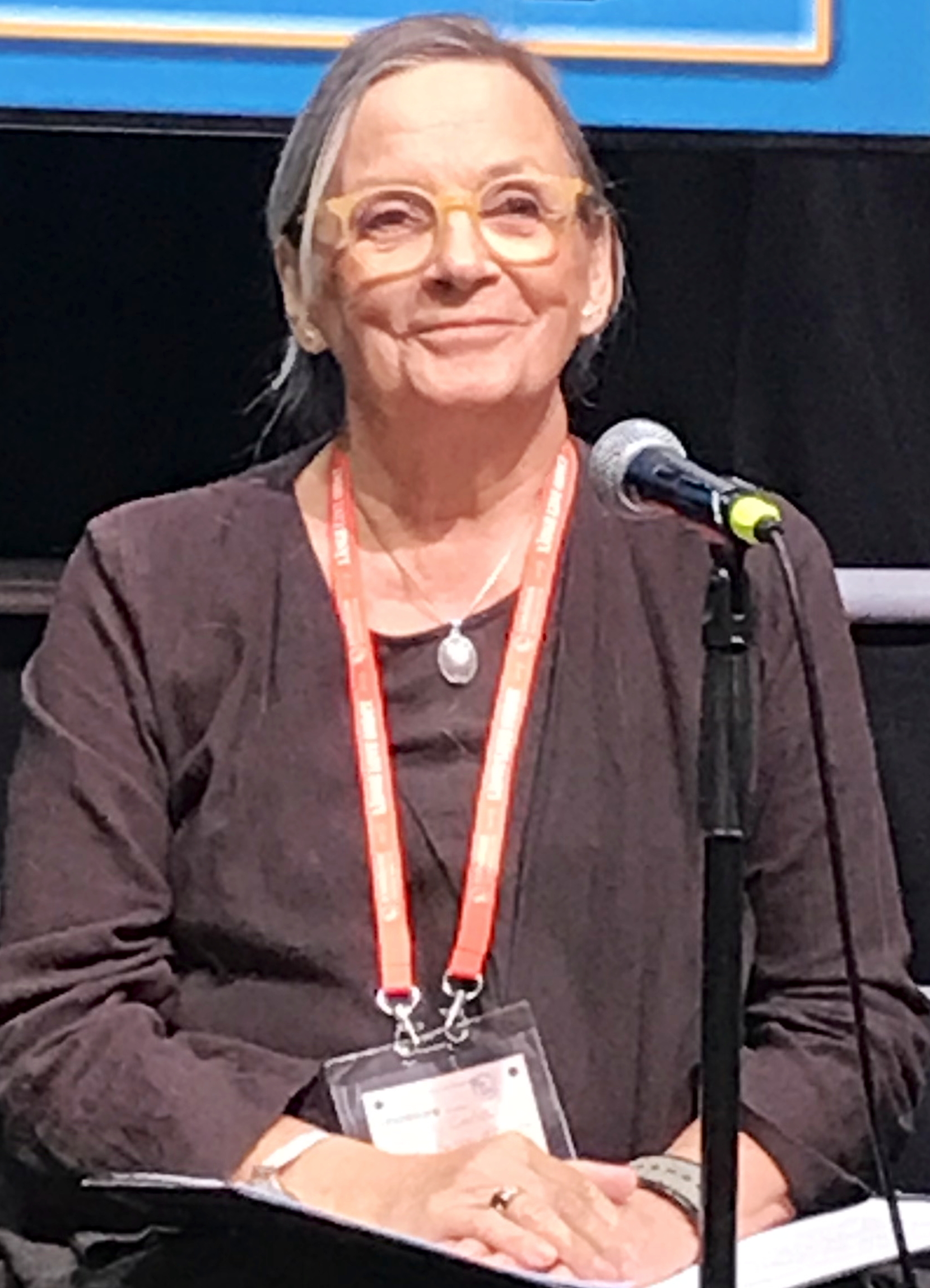
- Carlstén in 2024
- Born: Birgit Maria Christine Carlstén; 8 December 1949; Huskvarna, Sweden
- Died: 2 June 2025 (aged 75); Uppsala, Sweden
- Education: Malmö Theatre Academy
- Occupations: Actress; singer

Birgit Maria Christine Carlstén (8 December 1949 – 2 June 2025) was a Swedish actress and singer.

== Life and career ==
Born in Huskvarna on 8 December 1949, Carlstén studied at the Malmö Theatre Academy from 1970 to 1974. She notably appeared on På spåret multiple times, winning the title alongside Tommy Engstrand in 1996.

Carlstén died in Uppsala on 2 June 2025, at the age of 75.

== Filmography ==
- Linus (1979)
- Sinkadus (1980)
- Hans Christian och sällskapet (1981)
- The Fox and the Hound (1981)
- The Sacrifice (1986)
- Polisen och domarmordet (1993)
- Good Night Irene (1994)
- Ivar Kreuger (1998)
- Saltön (2005)
