= Ina Lundström =

Swedish journalist

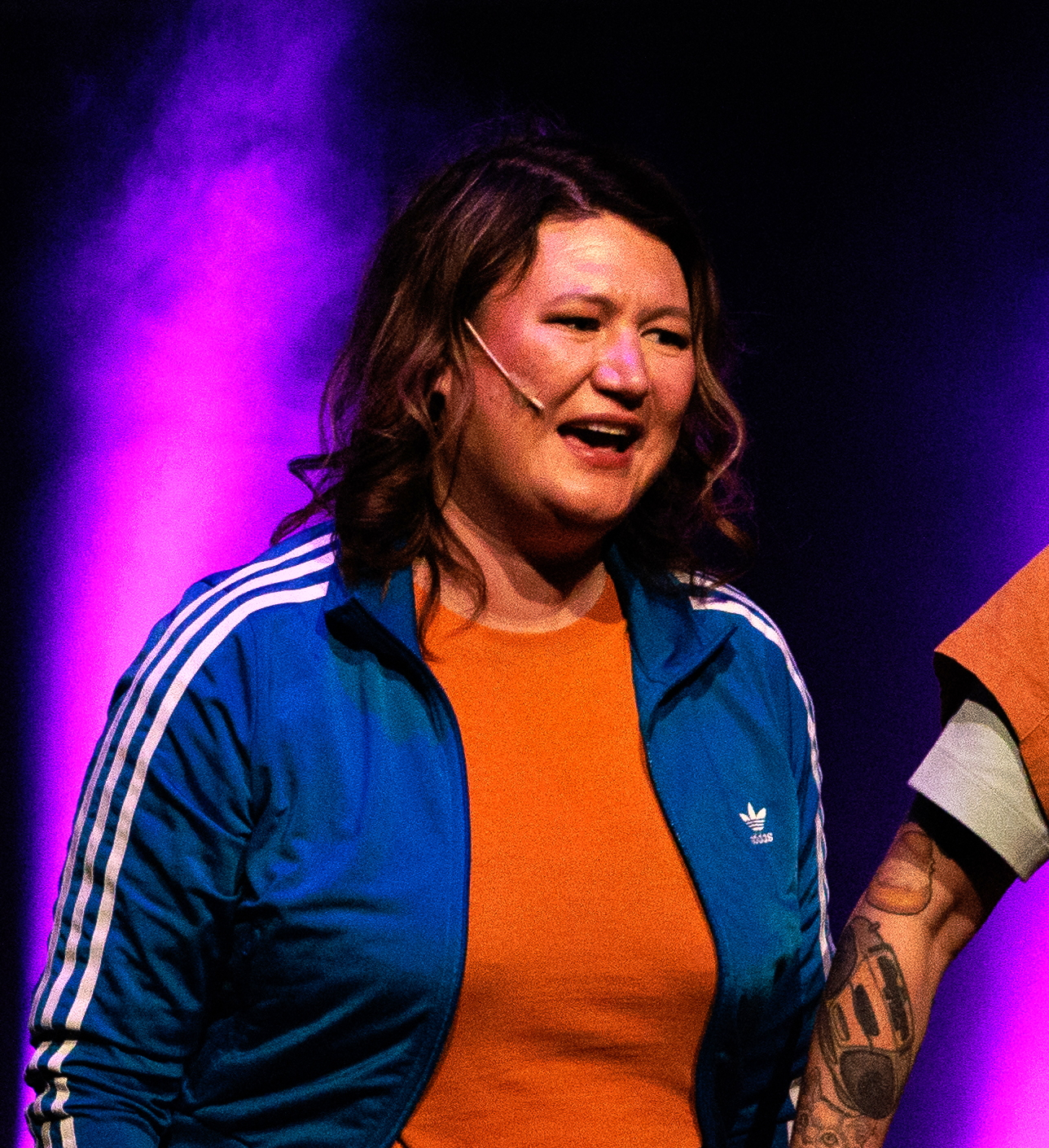
- Ina Lundström in 2022
- Born: Ina Märtha Levina Lundström; 11 May 1983 (age 43); Gothenburg, Sweden

Ina Märtha Levina Lundström (born 11 May 1983) is a Swedish journalist, radio presenter and stand-up comedian. She is best known as presenter of the Sveriges Radio shows Ring P1 and Karlavagnen and since 2020 she presents the pod Flashback forever.

== Biography ==
Ina Lundström grew up in Gothenburg along with her parents and brother. She grew up in a collective in central Gothenburg, and later in Hovås her mother has roots in Indonesia, and her father is from Borås. Lundström lived with her family in her teen years in Kuala Lumpur, Malaysia. Lundström took theater lessons at Scenskolan.

Ina Lundström has worked as freelance journalist for magazines like Filter and Offside, between 2010 and 2014, she also worked for the magazine Faktum as an editor. She later was the editor-in-chief for the food magazine Hunger.

She became known in 2014, when she was invited to the podcast Snedtänkt hosted by Kalle Lind, which led to Lundström wanting to work with pods. She soon started the podcast Piskan och moroten where she and workout expert Magnus Carlsson documented Lundströms efforts to become runner. After this she started the podcast Resan till Klubb Hybris along with Emma Knyckare.

In later years she has worked for Sveriges Radios shows Ring P1 and Karlavagnen.

In 2021, she presented the show Karantän-TV on SVT. Since 2020, she is one of the presenters and producers of the podcast Flashback forever along with Emma Knyckare. In 2022, she along with Hanna Hellquist, reached the final of På spåret on SVT. They lost to Jonatan Unge and Cecilia Düringer Ina Lundström presented an episode of Sveriges Radios Sommar i P1 where she told about her life. She also presented the SVT show Ina hjärta Bruce.

Ina Lundström lives with her daughter and husband in Majorna.
