= PLEASE =

- Directed by: Anna Mantzaris
- Written by: Anna Mantzaris
- Produced by: Johan Edström; Erika Forzy; Caroline Audebert; Marc Bodin-Joyeux; Radim Procházka; Lise Fearnley; Tonje Skar Reiersen; Jani Lehto
- Starring: Stellan Skarsgård; Molly Nilsson; Ika Nord; Jonatan Unge; Johan Edström
- Cinematography: Donna Wade
- Edited by: Anna Mantzaris
- Music by: Studio Salamanca, Phil Brookes
- Production companies: Apparat Filmproduktion AB; Passion Paris Production; Film i Väst; SVT; Mikrofilm AS; Kuli Film s.r.o.; Böhle Studios; YLE
- Distributed by: MIYU DISTRIBUTION
- Release date: 2026
- Running time: 9 min 8 sec
- Countries: Sweden; France; Czech Republic; Norway; Finland
- Language: English

PLEASE is an animated stop-motion short film written and directed by Anna Mantzaris released in 2026. The 9-minutes film, explores the human desire for intimacy, affection, and acceptance. The film was presented at Cannes Film Festival in the Focus WIP 2026 Edition and had its world premiere at Animafest Zagreb in June 2026.

== Plot ==
PLEASE presents a series of loosely connected vignettes following several characters as they navigate their needs for interpersonal connection and romance.

== Accolades ==
Year	Festivals	Award/Category	Status
2026	Hamptons International Film Festival	Golden Starfish Award	Nominated
2026	Flipbook Film Festival	Grand Prix for Best Animated Film	Won
2026	Animasyros	Grand Prize	Won
2026	Annecy International Animation Film Festival	Jean-Luc Xiberras Award for a First Film	Won
2026	Chicago International Film Festival	Gold Hugo	Nominated
2026	Animation is Film Festival	Special Jury Prize	Won
