= Barbro Holmberg =

Swedish politician (born 1952)

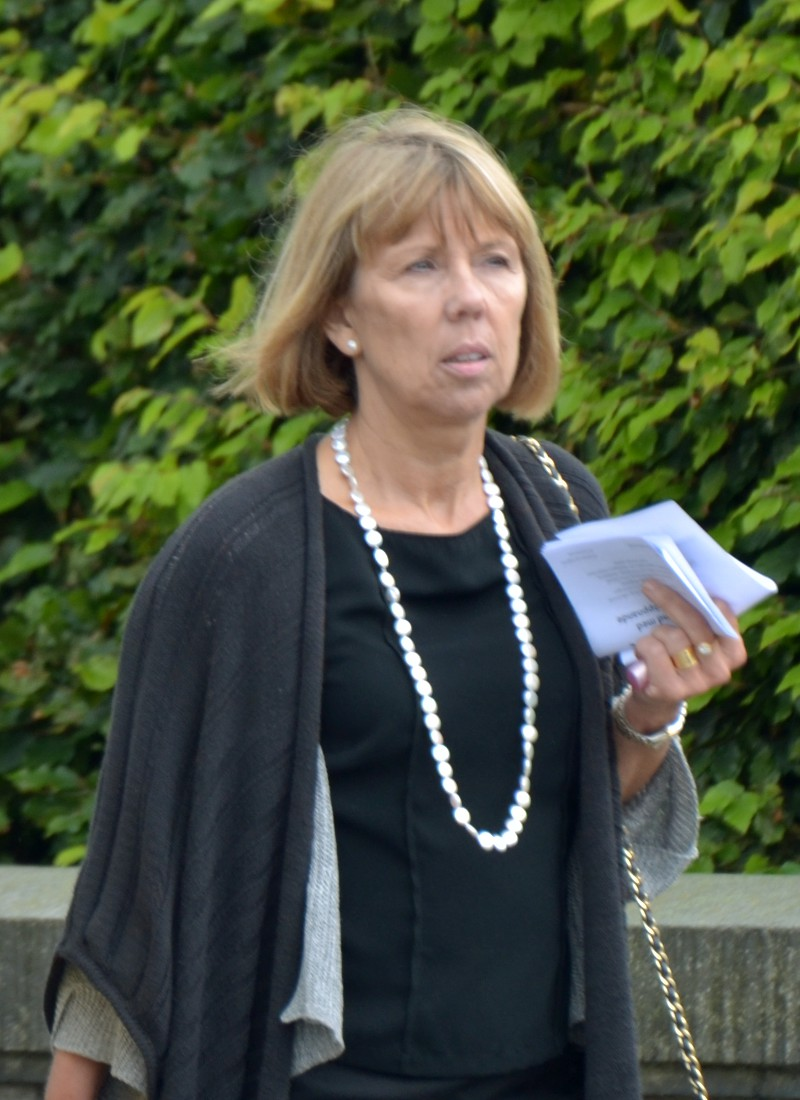
- Holmberg in September 2012

Governor of Gävleborg
- In office 21 January 2008 – 31 July 2015 (7 years, 191 days)
- Appointed by: Fredrik Reinfeldt
- Preceded by: Christer Eirefelt
- Succeeded by: Per Bill

Minister for Migration and Asylum Policy
- In office 10 October 2003 – 6 October 2006 (2 years, 361 days)
- Prime Minister: Göran Persson
- Preceded by: Jan O. Karlsson
- Succeeded by: Tobias Billström

Personal details
- Born: 7 April 1952 (age 74) Lycksele, Västerbotten County, Sweden
- Party: Social Democratic
- Spouse: Thomas Nordegren (div. 1987)
- Children: 3, including Elin Nordegren
- Education: Stockholm University

Barbro Holmberg (Swedish pronunciation: [ˈbǎrːbroː ˈhɔ̂lmbærj]; born 7 April 1952) is a Swedish Social Democratic politician. On 10 October 2003 she was appointed Minister for Migration and Asylum Policy in the Swedish Government. As a consequence of the change of government following the 2006 government election, she left office on 6 October 2006, and in 2008 she was appointed the governor of Gävleborg County.

Holmberg was born in Lycksele, Västerbotten, and grew up in Jörn. She has a degree in social work.

She was married to radio journalist Thomas Nordegren and has three children, including Elin Nordegren, who has been married to the American golfer Tiger Woods.

== Career ==
- 2008 – Governor of Gävleborg County
- 2003 – Minister, Ministry for Foreign Affairs
- 2003 – Director-General, Swedish Migration Board
- 2002 – State Secretary, Ministry for Foreign Affairs
- 1999 – Political Adviser, Ministry for Foreign Affairs
- 1999 – Project Leader, the Children's Project, Ministry for Foreign Affairs
- 1998 – Secretary of the Committee appointed to review the activities of the Office of the Children's Ombudsman
- 1996 – Secretary of the Committee on the Convention on the Rights of the Child (appointed to review Swedish legislation and practice in relation to the UN Convention)
- 1995 – Editor, Socialpolitik magazine
- 1989 – Freelance (assignments from the National Institute of Public Health, National Board of Health and Welfare, Ministry of Health and Social Affairs, Swedish Alcohol Retailing Monopoly, Swedish Association of Local Authorities, etc.)
- 1980 – Editor, PsykologTidningen magazine
- 1977 – Information Officer, National Association for Aid to Drug Abusers (RFHL)
- 1976 – Research Assistant, National Board of Health and Welfare

Political offices
Preceded by Jan O. Karlsson	Swedish Minister for Migration; 2003 - 2006	Succeeded by Tobias Billström
