= Cecilia Hagen =

Swedish journalist and writer

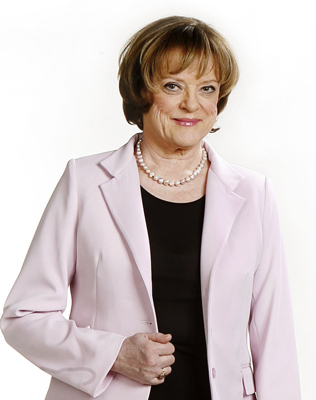
- Born: Ellen Cecilia Margareta Hagen; 4 January 1946; Stockholm, Sweden
- Education: Stockholm School of Economics; Journalism College
- Occupations: Journalist and writer
- Years active: 1970–present
- Spouse: Ingemar Unge (m. 1976–1989)
- Children: 2, including Jonatan Unge
- Relatives: Tord Hagen (father); Ellen Hagen (grandmother)

Ellen Cecilia Margareta Hagen (born 15 May 1946) is a Swedish journalist and writer. She has worked for Expressen newspaper since 1973.

== Early life ==
Hagen was born on 15 May 1946 in Stockholm, Sweden, the son of ambassador Tord Hagen and his first wife Lena (née Berg). She passed studentexamen in 1964 and attended Schartaus handelsgymnasium in 1965. She studied at Stockholm School of Economics from 1965 to 1967 and Journalism College (Journalisthögskolan i Stockholm) from which she graduated in 1969.

== Career ==
Hagen was an employee of Vecko-Journalen from 1970 to 1973 and Expressen from 1973.

She has several times participated in På spåret on SVT, and she has teamed up with her son Jonatan Unge. She won På spåret in 1995 along with Tomas Tengby.

== Personal life ==
From 1976 to 1989, she was married to journalist Ingemar Unge. They had two children, the son Jonatan and the daughter Josefin.

== Bibliography ==
- 1981 – Några skvättar ur ett vällingfläckat liv
- 1982 – Inte bara barnsligheter
- 1985 – Fredrik och Charlotte: fint folk från vaggan till graven
- 1987 – Mamma bit för bit
- 1989 – Rebecka Aurora Eloise von Bernadotte
- 1990 – De bästa kåserierna
- 1994 – Kulla-Gulla i övergångsåldern – eller Nu fyller alla duktiga flickor 50
- 1996 – Fredrik och Charlotte: tio år senare
- 1998 – Stockholm från min blå buss: Cecilia Hagen berättar från nya linje 4
- 1998 – Blandande känslor
- 1999 – London är som Stockholm fast lite större
- 1999 – Tantvarning!
- 2000 – Ellen Svenssons dagbok
- 2002 – De osannolika systrarna Mitford: En sannsaga
- 2005 – Mina resor med Diana
- 2008 – Kulla-Gulla stretar vidare – lägesrapport vid 60+
- 2013 – Kulla-Gullas lilla lila: en ABC-bok om livet efter jobbet. Stockholm: Bonnier fakta. Libris 13564926. ISBN 9789174243253
- 2016 – Ständigt frågvis – 726 människor jag mött
