= Göran Hägg =

Swedish writer

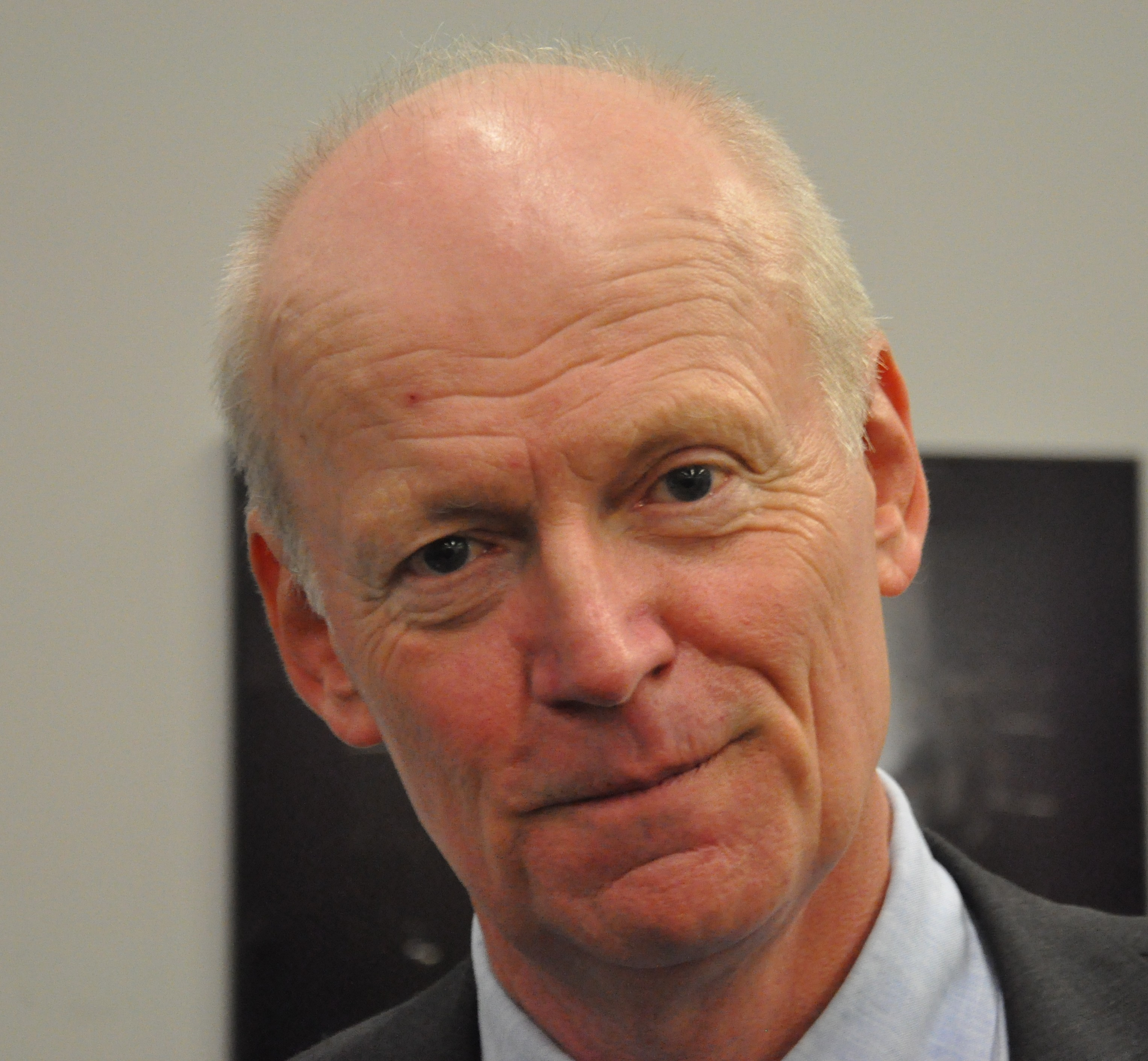
Göran Hägg in 2011

Göran Olof Waldemar Hägg (7 July 1947 – 30 September 2015) was a Swedish author, critic and docent in literature science.

== Biography ==
Hägg grew up in Tallkrogen, south of Stockholm. After graduating from studies in philosophy at Stockholm University in 1969, and also graduating from the Teacher school in Uppsala, Hägg worked between 1971 and 1979 as a teacher at Arbetsmarknadsutbildningen in Stockholm. His experiences there are the background to the satirical novel Det automatiska paradiset, which was published in 1979. His first book release happened before that, in 1972, with the poem collection called Ögon.

After a number of novels, the standard works Den svenska litteraturhistorien (History of Swedish literature, 1996), Praktisk retorik (1998) and Världens litteraturhistoria (History of literature of the world, 2000) were published.

In 1978, Hägg became a doctor of philosophy with the thesis Övertalning och underhållning. Den svenska essäistiken 1890–1930; after that he became a docent in literary science at Stockholm University. From 1979, he was the book reviewer for Aftonbladet and from 1981 also in Månadsjournalen, where he reviewed books until 2002. In 1974, Hägg won the Aftonbladets litteraturpris. And in the 2006–07 season, he won the television game show På spåret broadcast on SVT along with singer Caroline af Ugglas.
