= Thomas Petersson (actor) =

Swedish actor and comedian from Halmstad (born 1962)

Thomas Petersson (born August 24, 1962) is a Swedish actor and comedian from Halmstad.

Petersson grew up on a farm and after finishing high school he worked as a tractor technician, while doing amateur theater. Peter Wahlbeck noticed Petersson's comic talent and talked him into starting with comedy. Petersson's breakthrough came with the TV show Släng dig i brunnen, which was broadcast from the comedy club Norra Brunn in Stockholm.

Petersson has appeared in many gameshows and panelshows on TV. He has competed twice in the popular show På spåret. As an actor, he has mainly appeared in farces.
