= Meeri Bodelid =

Swedish multi sport athlete

Personal information
- Born: Meeri Annikki Jaako; 23 December 1943 (age 82) Ylitornio, Finland

Sport
- Country: Sweden
- Sport: cross-country skiing; team cycling; marathon; triathlon; duathlon

Meeri Annikki Bodelid (née Jaako; born 23 December 1943) is a Swedish multi sport athlete. Standing 1.51 m (4 ft 11 1/4 in) she left her mark, winning Swedish national championships in three sports. She competed for Sweden in the 1972 Winter Olympics in the cross-country skiing 5 km, 10 km and 3 × 5 km relay. Bodelid also represented Sweden at three world championships.

She also was Swedish national champion in team cycling in 1971 and 1972, teamed with Elisabet Höglund and Monica Bengtsson. In 1975 she won the national championship in the individual 60 km road race. In 1980 she took up Marathon running while still setting record in cross-country skiing.

By 1982 she became the Swedish national champion by finishing second behind Ingrid Kristiansen at the Stockholm Marathon. She narrowly missed making the Swedish Olympic team in the marathon in 1984, setting her personal best at age 40 in 2:39:39. She represented Sweden in the 1987 World Marathon Cup already at age 43. In 1993, she was still competing, setting the masters W45 World Record in the 10,000 metres at age 49.

She was also an early pioneer in triathlon and duathlon, starting in 1983. After working as a coach and then a massage therapist, she began her education at the Scandinavian Chiropractic College at age 50 and became a licensed chiropractor four years later.

== Early life ==
Bodelid was born in Ylitornio, Finland, and she moved to Sweden in the early 1960s.

== Cross-country skiing results ==
=== Olympic Games ===
Year	Age	5 km	10 km	3 × 5 km relay
1972	28	33	19	8

=== World Championships ===
Year	Age	5 km	10 km	20 km	4 × 5 km relay
1974	30	—	—	—N/a	5
1978	34	—	26	20	4
