= Johan Hilton =

Swedish journalist (born 1977)

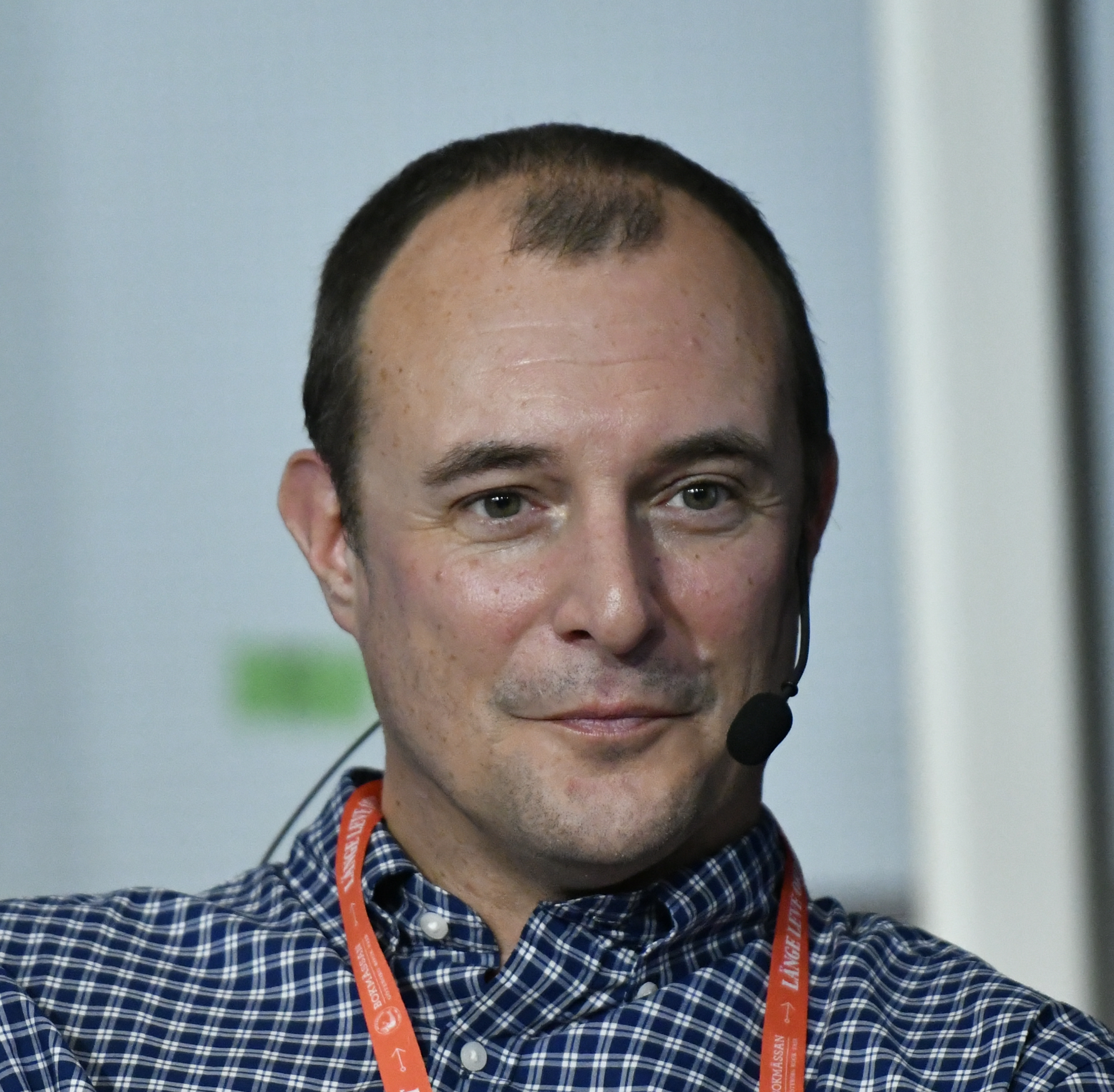
- Johan Hilton at the Göteborg Book Fair in 2024.
- Born: Johan Niklas Börje Friberg; May 31, 1977 (age 49); Borås, Sweden
- Occupations: Author journalist
- Writing career
- Language: Swedish
- Notable work: "No Tears for Queers"

Johan Niklas Börje Hilton (born "Friberg", May 31, 1977), is a Swedish journalist and author.

== Background ==
Hilton has been a recurring broadcaster on Sveriges Radio P1 and P3, including programmes such as Kvällspasset and Hilton in P1. He has, as a cultural journalist and theater critic, previously been active on the website Nummer.

Between 2008 and 2012 he was deputy culture manager of Expressen and was also their literary and theater editor. In 2012 he took over as manager of Arenagruppens publisher Atlas. In January 2016 Hilton left Atlas to instead work as editor and theater criticer at Dagens Nyheter.

Hilton's book No Tears for Queers, a crime reportage about hate crime, including the Matthew Shepard case, was awarded the Book of the Year at Gaygalan 2005 and the Year's Reading of the Nöjesguiden the same year.

In the autumn of 2009, a play based on the book had its premiere at the National Swedish Touring Theatre. The play has since then been performed in several European countries, such as the Czech Republic and Slovenia.

In August 2015, Hilton's second book, Monster i garderoben, was published. It is about Anthony Perkins and the time that created Norman Bates. Monster i garderoben was nominated for the August Prize 2015 and for the book of the year on Gaygalan, also in 2015.

The season 2016/17, Hilton competed with Kristin Lundell in the TV show På spåret, where they won the competition.

== Publications ==
- No Tears for Queers ISBN 9789173893947
- Monster i garderoben ISBN 9789127134300
- Vi är orlando

== Personal life ==
Johan Hilton is married and currently living in Stockholm.
