= Elin Nordegren =

Swedish model and nanny (born 1980)

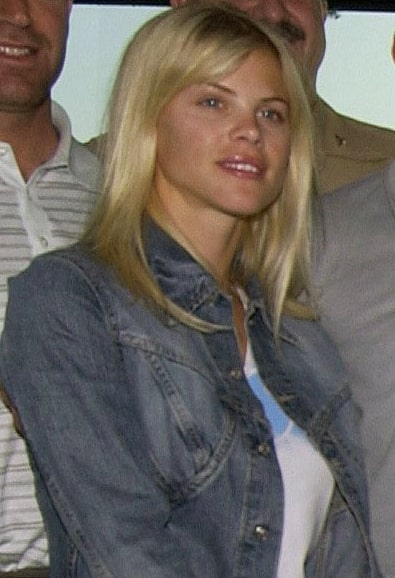
- Nordegren touring the USS George Washington in the Persian Gulf, March 2003
- Born: Elin Maria Pernilla Nordegren; 1 January 1980 (age 46); Stockholm, Sweden
- Other name: Elin Woods
- Education: Rollins College
- Spouse: Tiger Woods (m. 2004; div. 2010)
- Partner: Jordan Cameron (2019–present)
- Children: 5, including Charlie
- Parents: Thomas Nordegren (father); Barbro Holmberg (mother)

Elin Maria Pernilla Nordegren (Swedish pronunciation: [ˈěːlɪn ˈnûːɖɛˌɡreːn]; born 1 January 1980) is a Swedish former model and nanny. She was married to professional golfer Tiger Woods from 2004 until their divorce in 2010.

== Early life and education ==
Nordegren was born in Stockholm. Her mother, politician Barbro Holmberg, is a former Swedish migration and asylum policy minister as well as a former governor of Gävleborg County. Her father, Thomas Nordegren, is a radio journalist who has served as a bureau chief in Washington, D.C. She has an elder brother, Axel, and a twin sister, Josefin Nordegren. Her parents divorced when she was seven years old. Nordegren and her sister had summer jobs as cashiers in supermarkets to finance their education. They moved to Germany with their father in 1997 for a year, studying English and German in eleventh grade at John F. Kennedy School, Berlin. Nordegren started modeling in 2000, and appeared on the cover of Cafe Sport magazine in the summer of 2000.

In May 2014, Nordegren graduated from Rollins College in Winter Park, Florida, with a degree in psychology, receiving the outstanding senior award. She gave the commencement address at the graduation ceremony.

== Personal life ==
=== Marriage and family ===
Nordegren worked at a Stockholm clothing store when she met Mia Parnevik, the wife of Swedish golfer Jesper Parnevik. He hired her as au pair to their children, the job requiring her to move to the United States. Tiger Woods was introduced to her during the 2001 Open Championship. In the previous year, Woods had asked to be introduced to Nordegren, who was seeing someone else at the time. "She had no interest in Tiger and he was OK with that," Mia Parnevik said. "There was a big line of single golfers wanting to meet her. They were gaga over her." At the time, she had hopes of becoming a child psychologist. In November 2003, Woods and Nordegren attended the Presidents Cup tournament in South Africa and became officially engaged when Woods proposed at the Shamwari Game Reserve.

They were married in October 2004, by the 19th hole of the Sandy Lane resort in Barbados. Woods rented the entire complex for a week, including three golf courses and 110 rooms, costing almost $2 million.

Nude photographs purportedly of Nordegren began circulating on the Internet. Despite their inauthenticity, the Irish magazine, The Dubliner published them, saying they were photographs of Nordegren. In November 2006, Nordegren filed a libel suit against The Dubliner, won the suit and was awarded €125,000. The Dubliner was also required subsequently to publish lengthy apologies on numerous prominent media outlets.

In 2007, Woods announced the birth of the couple's daughter, Sam Alexis, a day after finishing second in the U.S. Open. On 2 September 2008, Woods announced they were expecting another child in late winter. Nordegren gave birth to a boy, Charlie Axel, in 2009.

=== Divorce ===
In December 2009, her marriage to Woods was the subject of extensive media coverage after Woods admitted to infidelity, which had been revealed following his single-vehicle accident near the family's Florida home. After Woods' infidelity was revealed, Jesper Parnevik was quoted as having said, "I'm kind of filled with sorrow for Elin since me and my wife are at fault for hooking her up with him, and we probably thought he was a better guy than he is." Woods announced he would take an "indefinite break" from golf to work on his marriage. These efforts were unsuccessful, however, as Nordegren and Woods finalized their divorce in the Bay County Circuit Court in Panama City, Florida, on 23 August 2010. Nordegren's legal team included her sister, Josefin (who is licensed to practice law in England and Sweden) and several of Josefin's U.S. colleagues at international law firm McGuireWoods.

Using the $100 million she received from her divorce from Woods, she purchased a $12 million Florida mansion built in the 1920s. She had the entire structure demolished after an architect advised that it made better sense to start over than to try bringing the home up to current hurricane safety codes. Before demolishing the home in December 2011, she allowed Habitat for Humanity to come into the home for four weeks and salvage anything they found of value. The contents of the estate were auctioned at a Habitat for Humanity warehouse, including a 12-foot (3.7 m) fountain with water spouts in three lions' mouths, five refrigerators, temperature-controlled wine coolers, and other furniture.

=== Later relationships ===
In 2011, Nordegren was in a relationship with American businessman Jamie Dingman, which lasted less than a year. She dated American entrepreneur Chris Cline from 2013 to 2017.

In June 2019, it was announced that Nordegren was expecting her first child with former National Football League player Jordan Cameron. Nordegren gave birth to a son, Arthur, in October 2019. In December 2022, Nordegren gave birth to their second child, reportedly a daughter. The couple also has a third child together.
