= Lina Thomsgård =

Swedish columnist and DJ

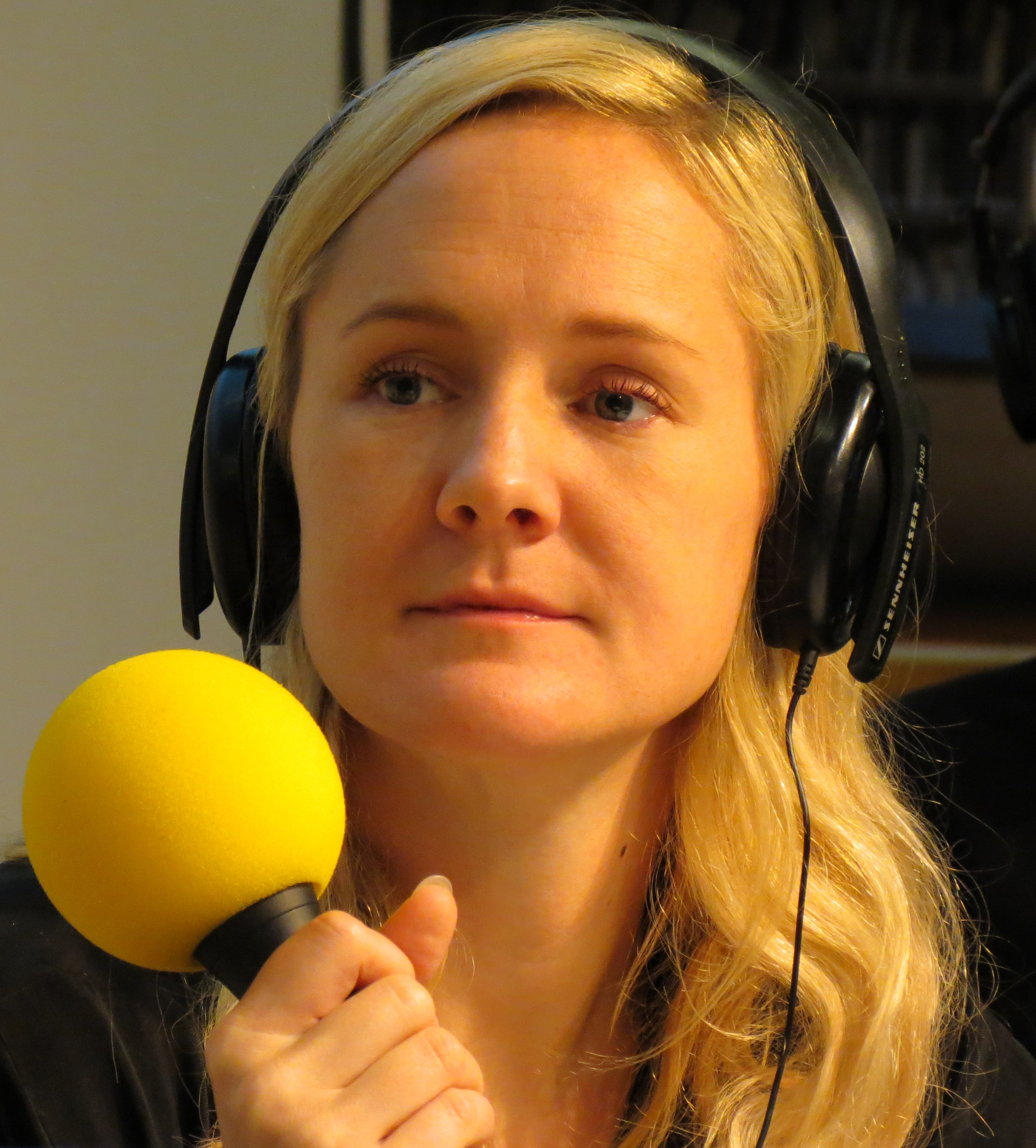
- Lina Thomsgård in 2012.
- Born: Lina Ingeborg Thomsgård; 3 May 1978 (age 47); Stockholm, Sweden
- Known for: Founder of Rättviseförmedlingen

Lina Ingeborg Thomsgård (born 3 May 1978 in Stockholm) is a Swedish columnist, DJ, and PR consultant. She is the founder of Rättviseförmedlingen.

She participated in the 2014–15 season of På spåret together with musician Jason Diakité.
