= Lotta Bromé =

Swedish radio and television presenter

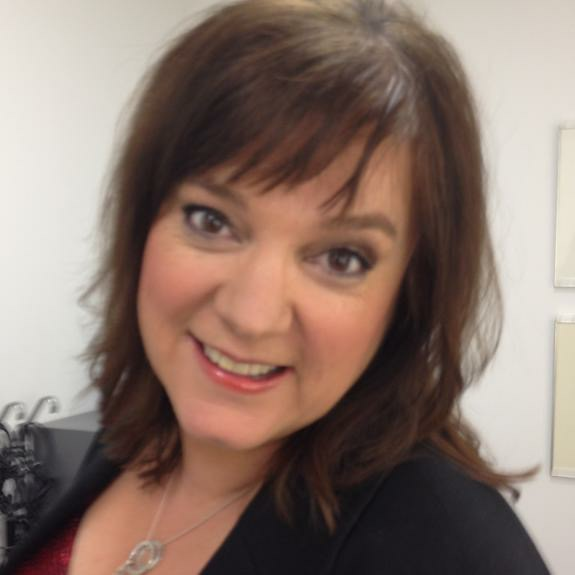
- Bromé in 2013
- Born: 18 December 1964 (age 60); Skövde, Sweden
- Occupation: Presenter

Charlotta "Lotta" Bromé (born 18 December 1964) is a Swedish radio and television presenter and host. She has been a Christmas Eve host at SVT, won the show På spåret and hosted various shows for Sveriges Radio.

== Early life ==
Bromé was born in Skövde, Sweden. When she was ten years old, she travelled to different retirement homes and played the piano. Her mother is a famous revue artist in Skara, while her sister sings in a jazz band.

== Career ==
Bromé has been a member of a pop band along with Anna Lena Brundin, and they have also written lyrics for singers such as Shirley Clamp. She has also done voice acting in the film Metropia along with Juliette Lewis and Stellan Skarsgård in 2009.

Bromé started her career in radio as a presenter at Radio Skaraborg. Lotta Bromé worked for many years on Sveriges Radio as a presenter for shows like Sommartoppen, Efter tre, På gränsen and Klang & Co. She has also presented the sports news in the show Radiosporten. She has also previously presented the local morning show at P5 Radio Stockholm. Since February 2008 she presents P4 Extra on Sveriges Radio P4. In 2003 she presented the SVT show Söndagsöppet; she was the last presenter of the show before it was canceled. She was also the presenter of the Christmas Eve shows on SVT during Christmas 2003, and the first to present it after the retired longtime host Arne Weise. She has also been a frequent competitor in the SVT show På spåret along with Carl Jan Granqvist; the duo won the 1998 season.

Bromé has won Stora Radiopriset in the category "Most popular female presenter of the year". She was named Ambassador of Filipstad in 2011.

Bromé provided commentary for the Eurovision Song Contest 2016 for SVT.

In November 2017, Bromé left her work at Sveriges Radio and as presenter of P4 Extra. This came after several women she had worked with accused her of sexual harassment.

== Personal life ==
Bromé has one daughter named Bonnie, born in 2006, with her ex-girlfriend Jessica Karlsson. The father of the girl is television presenter Henrik Olsson. Bromé has shared parental custody with Olsson and Karlsson. Since 2008, she has been in a relationship with Camilla Berg.
