= Hipphipp! =

Swedish television show

Hipphipp! is a Swedish comedy sketch show that ran for three seasons on SVT - First in 2001, then in 2003, with a final one in 2011. It also spawned a live-show and a four-part Christmas special. A film about Morgan Pålsson and Robert Flycht had its premiere in late February 2008. The show was created by and primarily stars the duo of Anders Jansson and Johan Wester. Many characters and concepts evolved from stage shows that the pair performed during the 1990s.

== Major characters ==
=== Kaj-Åke "Kajan" Hansson ===
A fire fighter instructor with a very special, and perhaps incompetent, approach to education.

=== Tiffany Persson ===
A single mother with five divorces in her past. She is easily agitated and tends to be very "in-your-face".

=== Itzhak Tadeusz Skenström (f. Horváth) ===
A very eccentric Hungarian immigrant who moved to Sweden in 1974. He is a professor of music and self-described "militant composer" who hosts a TV-series called "Itzhak's musical journey", where he takes the viewer all across Europe to learn about classical music.

=== Göran and Jolanta Jonsered ===
Göran runs a tour where people can see local B and C-list celebrities. Jolanta is his wife and partner.

=== Tony Thomasson and Fredrik "Zunken" Sundqvist ===
Two shabby hustlers who usually sell stolen goods.

=== Morgan Pålsson and Robert Flycht ===
An international and self-absorbed TV news correspondent who believes himself to be the crowning glory of Swedish Television and his bullied cameraman and side-kick.

=== Andrej and Jerzy Petrov ===
Two Russian brothers which perform medleys with famous songs.

=== Björn Blom and Thorvald Mjaaland ===
Two adventurers that climb a mountain.

=== Mike Higgins ===
An Englishman who tries to teach Swedish to other English-speaking persons. Host of "Svenska för nybörjare" (Swedish for Beginners).
