= Louise Epstein =

Swedish journalist and author

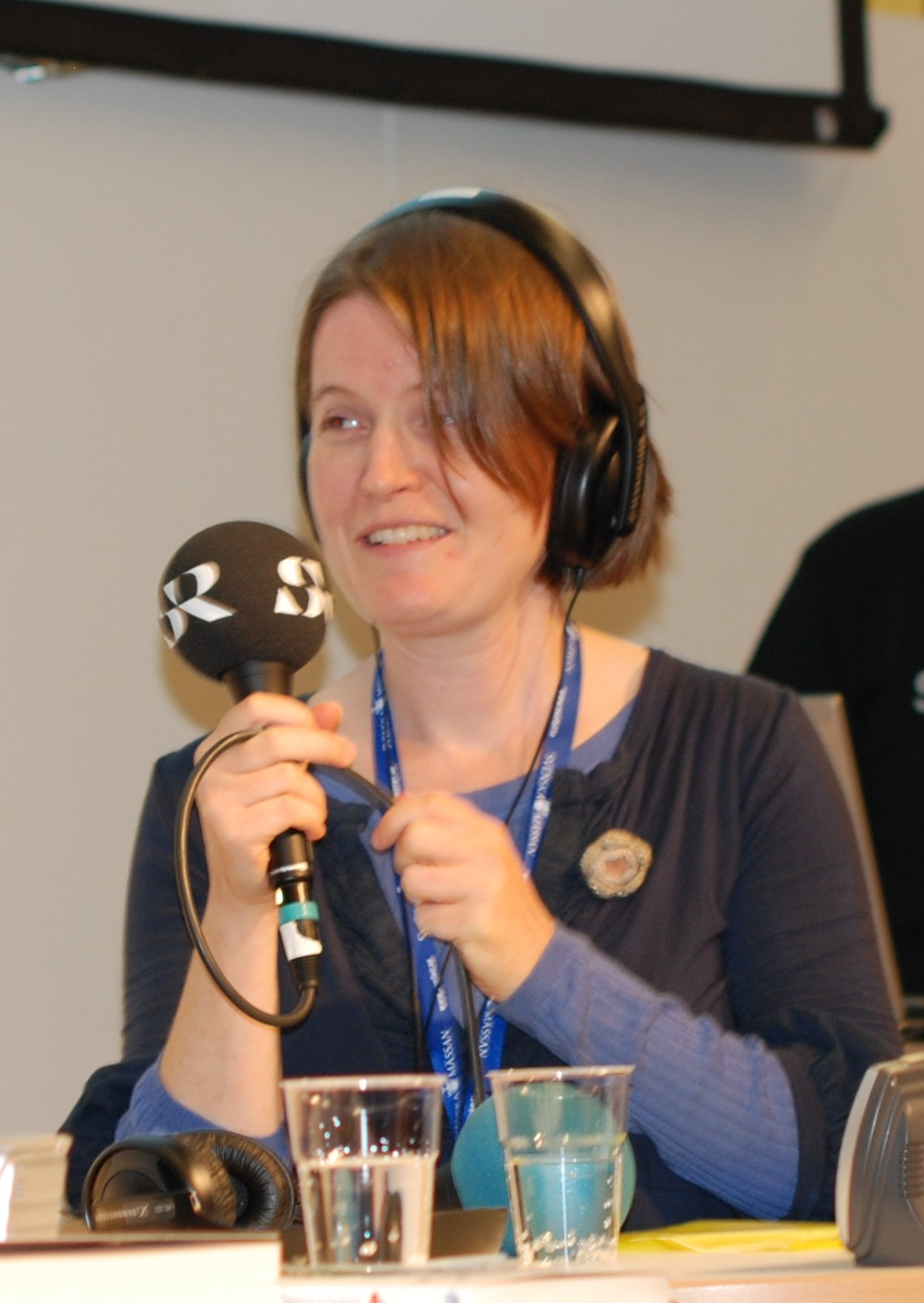
- Louise Epstein (2010)
- Born: 16 July 1965 (age 61); Malmö, Sweden
- Occupation: Presenter

Dina Louise Epstein (born 16 July 1965) is a Swedish journalist and author.

== Academic studies ==
Epstein has studied literary science and history of ideas at Lund University. She also studied to become a radio producer at Dramatiska Institutet.

== Work life ==
=== Author ===
Epstein is the author of two novels, En trollkarl vittnar inte (1992) and Sju dagar i augusti (1994) both released by the publisher Brombergs.

=== Radio ===
She works at Sveriges Radio's culture department and is every year one of the first to comment on the announcement of that year's Nobel Prize in Literature winner.

Since January 2011, and along with Thomas Nordegren, Epstein has presented the daily show Nordegren & Epstein i P1 at Sveriges Radios P1. The two alternate as host and sidekick.

In late 2014, Epstein and Nordegren teamed up for the entertainment show På spåret, broadcast on Sveriges Television.

== Bibliography ==
- En trollkarl vittnar inte, Brombergs, Stockholm, 1992, ISBN 91-7608-584-8
- Sju dagar i augusti, Brombergs, Stockholm, 1994 ISBN 91-7608-638-0
