= Hanna Hellquist =

Swedish journalist, TV host and writer

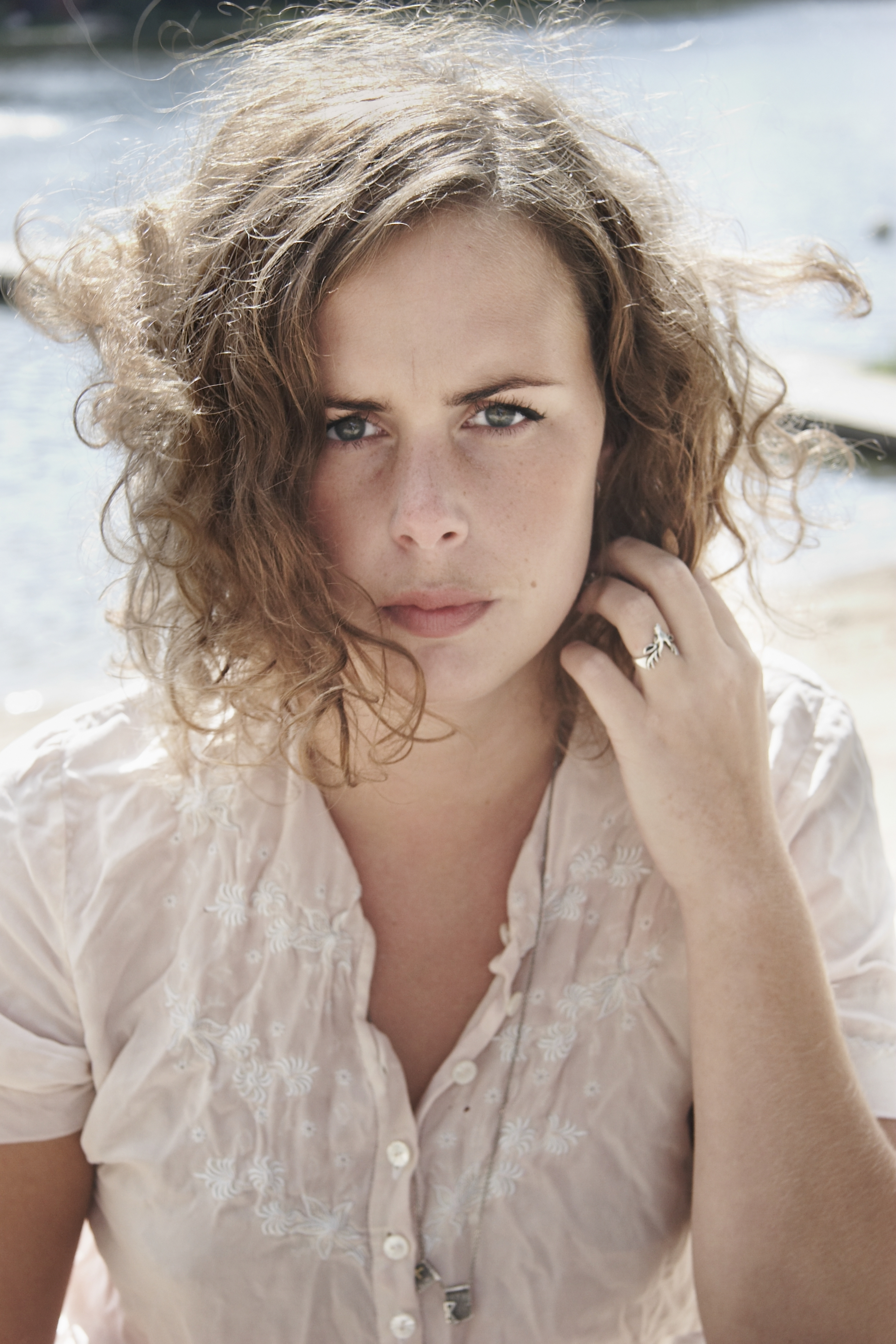
- Hellquist on 15 August 2008
- Born: Hanna Victoria Hellqvist; 24 July 1980 (age 45); Karlstad, Sweden
- Occupations: Journalist, TV/radio host, author

Hanna Victoria Hellquist (born Hellqvist, 24 July 1980), is a Swedish journalist, TV host and writer.

After internship at the National Swedish Labour Market Board (Arbetsmarknadsstyrelsen, AMS), Hellquist started working as journalist at Karlstads-Tidningen when she was 19 years old and after that she has worked at among TV4 Värmland, Göteborgs-Posten, Resumé and Dagens Nyheter. On Dagens Nyheter she was famous for her causeries in Namn & Nytt and later for her chronicles in På Stan and for her interviews in DN Söndag. Since January 2009 she hosts Morgonpasset on Sveriges Radio P3. In 2009, she hosted an episode of Sommar in Sveriges Radio P1.

In the spring of 2011, her TV-program Jakten på lyckan was broadcast on Sveriges Television. Earlier Hellquist studied gender studies at the University of Gothenburg. As author Hellquist has written among Karlstad Zoologiska (2009) which is about her father and when she grew up in Karlstad.

In 2022, she, along with Ina Lundström, reached the final of På spåret on SVT.
