= Pia Herrera =

Swedish journalist and television presenter

- Born: Pia Lisa Jurvanen; 18 April 1970 (age 56); Lund, Sweden
- Other name: Pia Conde
- Occupations: Journalist; TV presenter; press manager
- Employers: TV4; SVT; SAS

Pia Lisa Herrera (previously Conde, née Jurvanen; born 18 April 1970) is a Swedish journalist and former television presenter at SVT.

== Career ==
Herrera started her career at TV4 hosting the daily news broadcast TV4-nyheterna, and later the Sunday breakfast television programme Söndagsmorgon.

After the switch to SVT, she has mainly hosted news broadcasts ABC, Rapport, Aktuellt and the business news programme A-ekonomi. Conde has also co-hosted and participated in lighter entertainment and game shows such as På spåret, the aid gala Världens barn, Allsång på Skansen and a television series about motor vehicles called Motoristen.

In 2024, she switched career to press manager at SAS.

== Personal life ==
She grew up in Sweden with a mother from Finland and an Afro-Cuban father.

Pia Herrera lives with Fredrik Sarman, attorney at law and also a Swede of Afro-Latino descent.
