= Tommy Engstrand =

Swedish television presenter (1939–2021)

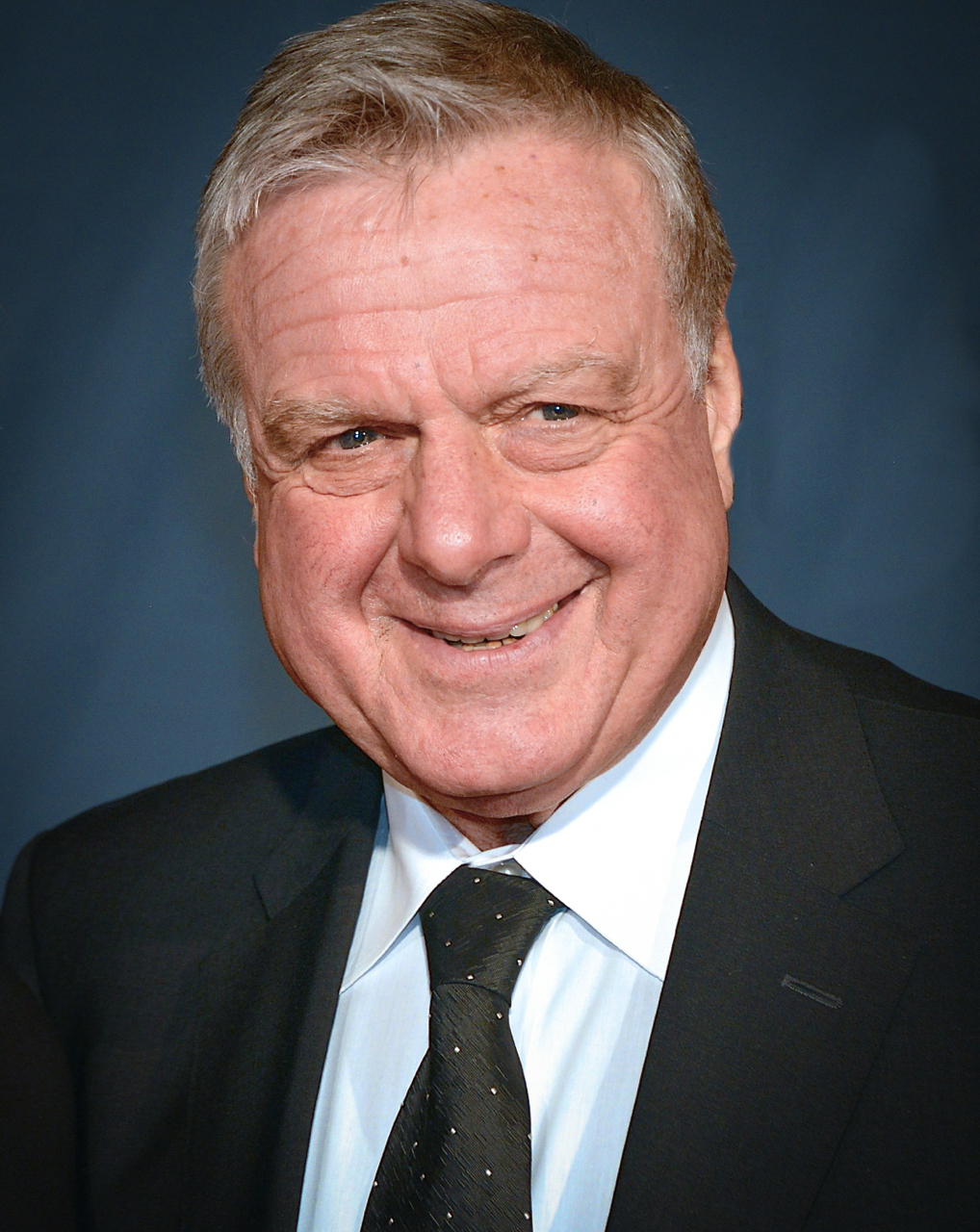
- Engstrand in 2013
- Born: Tommy Clarence Engstrand; 30 September 1939; Stockholm, Sweden
- Died: 18 July 2021 (aged 81); Stockholm, Sweden
- Occupations: Sports commentator, journalist
- Spouse: Kersti Blomgren (m. 1965–1969)
- Partner: Britt-Marie Karlén

Tommy Clarence Engstrand (30 September 1939 – 18 July 2021) was a Swedish sports journalist, sports commentator, and television host of general interest shows like Razzel and Zick-Zack.

== Early life ==
Engstrand was born on 30 September 1939 in Stockholm, Sweden, the son of Viktor Engstrand, a sheet metal worker, and his wife Svea (née Jacobsson). He grew up on Tomtebogatan in Vasastan in Stockholm together with future journalists Lars-Gunnar Björklund and Åke Wilhelmsson. Engstrand passed the realexamen in 1955.

== Career ==
Engstrand began his sports career at Idrottsbladet from 1960 to 1966. He then worked for Se magazine from 1966 to 1969 and Aftonbladet in 1969. He was employed by Sveriges Radio, Sveriges Television, and Sveriges Riksradio between 1969 and 1987 where he became one of Hyland's boys", together with Lars-Gunnar Björklund, Fredrik Belfrage, and Ingvar Oldsberg, who were young sports journalists educated by Lennart Hyland. Engstrand was head of Sveriges Riksradio's sports editorial from 1979 to 1987 and worked as a freelancer, among other things, with assignments for Sweden's Radio from 1987.

In 1972, Engstrand and fellow sports journalist Bo Gentzel found themselves trapped in a BMW with a driver at the Fürstenfeldbruck Air Base outside Munich during the Munich Olympics hostage crisis. About 40 meters away stood the airplane carrying Palestinian terrorists and nine Israeli wrestlers they had taken hostage. For more than forty minutes, the two journalists were unexpectedly part of the events at Fürstenfeldbruck Air Base. They were the only journalists there because their driver had done military service at the base and drove them there, while the rest of the world's media had gone to Munich Airport. Amid the sound of gunfire and grenades, their car eventually managed to get free from the mud and they drove to the nearest inn to find a telephone. From the bar counter, Engstrand dictated a report to the Swedish radio news program Dagens Eko. However, Dagens Eko decided not to broadcast the report, partly because it came from two sports journalists. The report was later broadcast in English translation on New Zealand radio.

Engstrand provided commentary on the FIFA World Cup 1978 final between Argentina and the Netherlands (3–1 after extra-time) for the only Swedish television company at that time, Sveriges Radio. He and Björn Borg became personal friends. Within sports, his radio commentary of the last minutes of the World-Cup qualifier between West Germany and Portugal on 16 October 1985, which ended with a single goal win for Portugal, is a bit of Swedish radio history, because the result meant that Portugal went ahead for the FIFA World Cup 1986 instead of Sweden. With two minutes left, he declared whilst close to crying "Portugal is leading 1–0, and I can't give you any hope". Sweden had earlier that day taken the lead by 1–0 against Czechoslovakia away, but lost 2–1; however, the hope was still alive, if only West Germany (that by this time had not lost any such game, and was playing at home) just took a single point, that would have been enough; but West Germany did not. The event became known as "Den svarta onsdagen" in Sweden ("The Black Wednesday").

Engstrand also commented on the Ice Hockey World Championships and The Rumble in the Jungle, the boxing match between Muhammad Ali and George Foreman in Zaire in 1974.

== Personal life ==
Engstrand was married to Kersti Blomgren (born 1943) from 1965 to 1969. From 1974, he was cohabiting with Britt-Marie Karlén (born 1948), the daughter of Arne Larsson and Margareta (née Holmberg).

== Death ==
Tommy Engstrand died in 2021 in Stockholm from complications of chronic obstructive pulmonary disease. The funeral service was held in Gustaf Vasa Church in Stockholm. Among the guests were many retired and active television sports commentators and executives from various media companies, including: Arne Hegerfors, Christer Ulfbåge, Fredrik Belfrage, Lasse Kinch, Artur Ringart, Ralf Edström, Jacob Håård, Pamela Andersson, Håkan Södergren, Åke Unger, Niklas Holmgren, Marcus Leifby, Bengt Skött, and Ulf Elfving.
