= Martina Haag =

Swedish actress and author

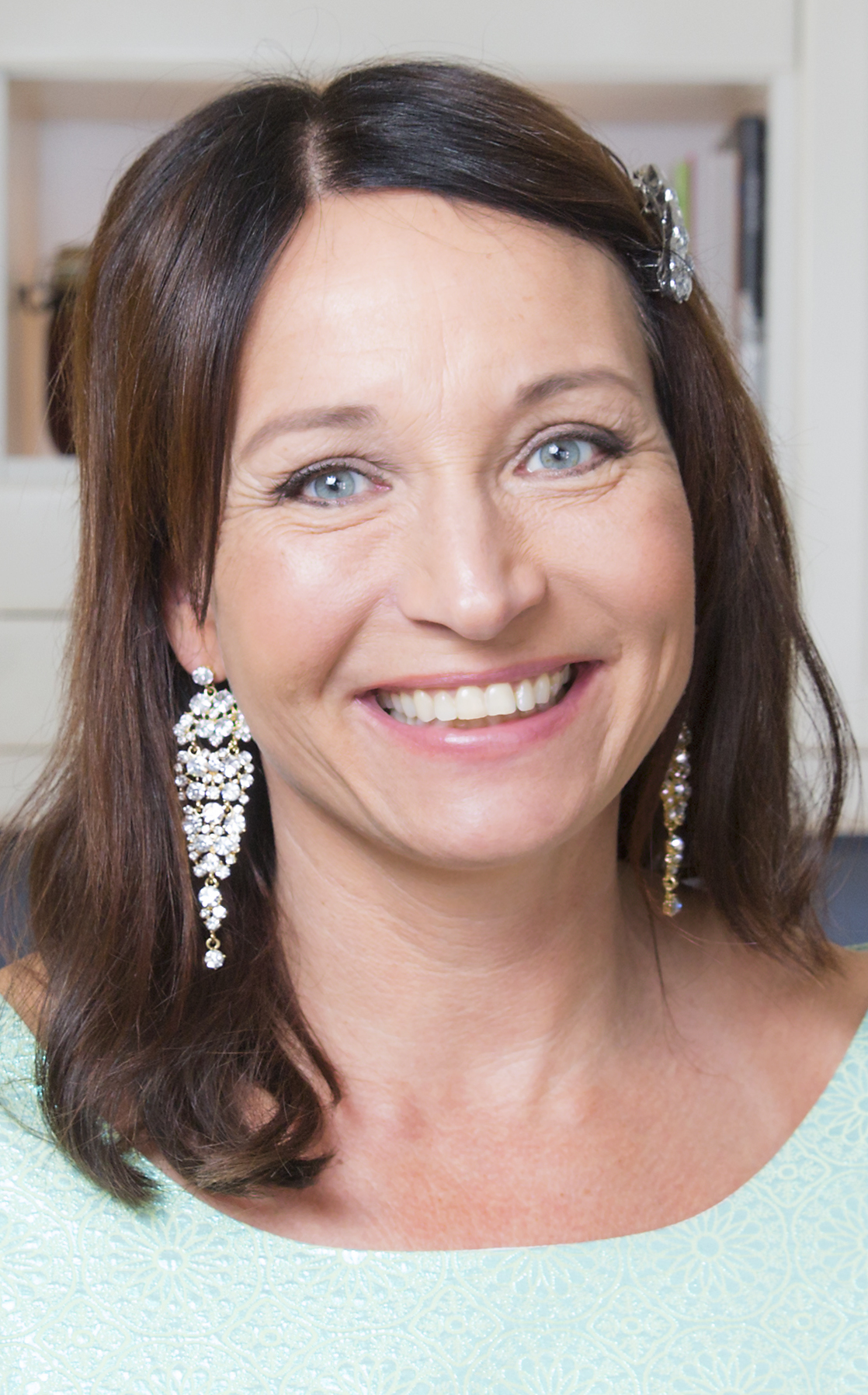
- Haag in 2015
- Born: 1964 (age 61–62); Lidingö, Sweden
- Occupations: Actress; author

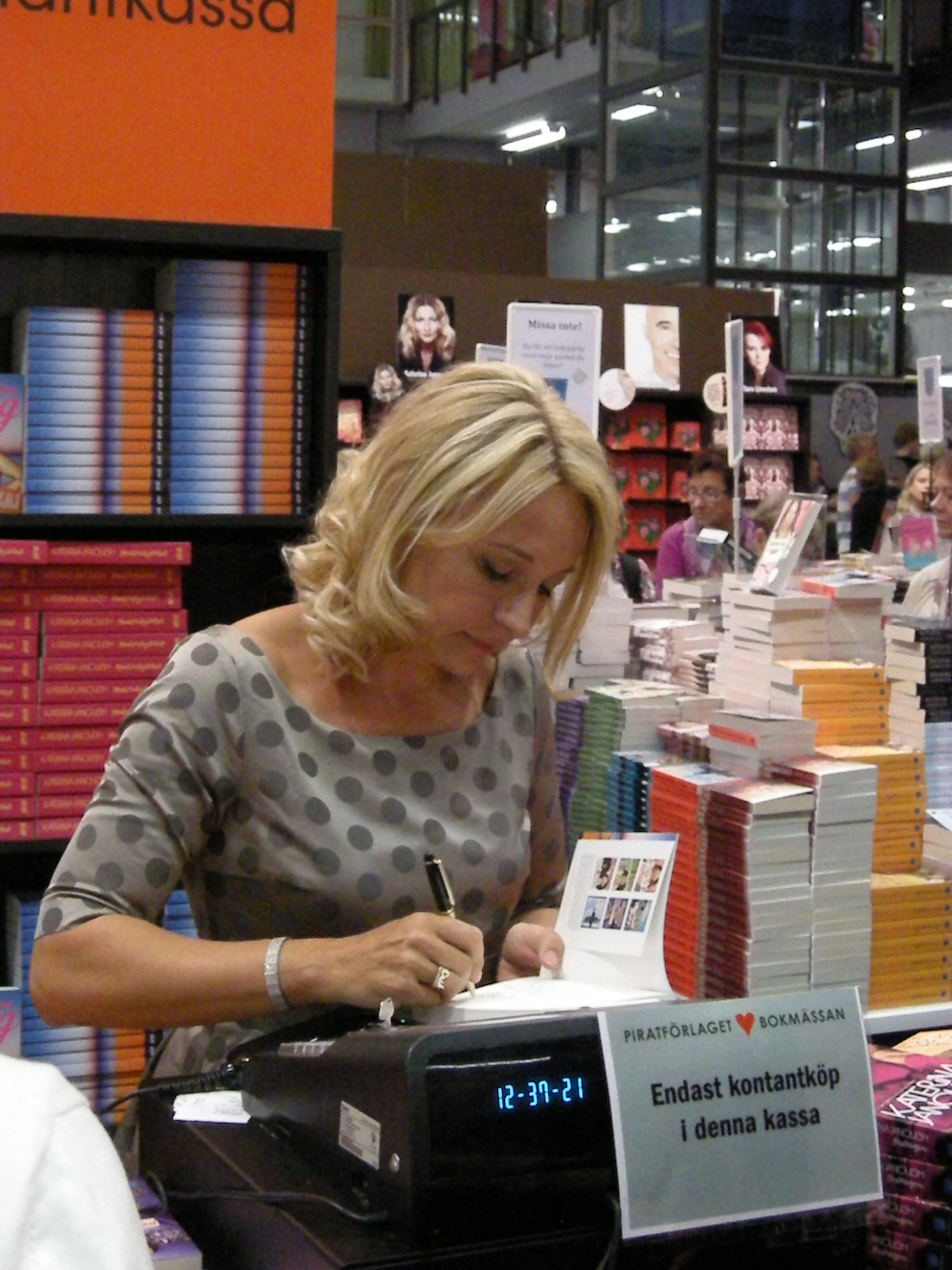
Martina Haag at Göteborg Book Fair in September 2012

Martina Haag (born 1964) is a Swedish actress and author. Martina Haag's father came to Sweden as a refugee from Estonia. She has acted in the film Underbar och älskad av alla in 2005. The film was made from her novel book with the same name. She participated in Let's Dance 2018 broadcast on TV4.

Together with host Erik Haag, she has four children. After 18 years of marriage, the couple filed for divorce in 2013 and divorced in 2014.

She made her directorial debut in 2025 with the film Det är något som inte stämmer.

== Books ==
- 2004: Hemma hos Martina
- 2005: Underbar och älskad av alla (och på jobbet går det också jättebra)
- 2006: Martina-koden
- 2008: I en annan del av Bromma
- 2010: Fånge i hundpalatset
- 2011: Glada hälsningar från Missångerträsk
- 2012: Heja, Heja!
- 2015: Det är något som inte stämmer
- 2017: Livet går så fort. Och så långsamt.
- 2023: Från och med nu

== Filmography ==
Films

- 1995: Älskar, älskar inte
- 1997: Adam & Eva
- 1997: Selma & Johanna – en roadmovie
- 2000: Det blir aldrig som man tänkt sig
- 2000: Naken
- 2001: Känd från TV
- 2005: Halva sanningen
- 2007: Underbar och älskad av alla
- 2010: Toy Story 3 (voice over in Swedish)

Television

- 1996: Percy tårar
- 1996: Pentagon (TV series)
- 1997: Silvermannen
- 2001: Heja Björn
