= Lennart Dahlgren =

Swedish weightlifter

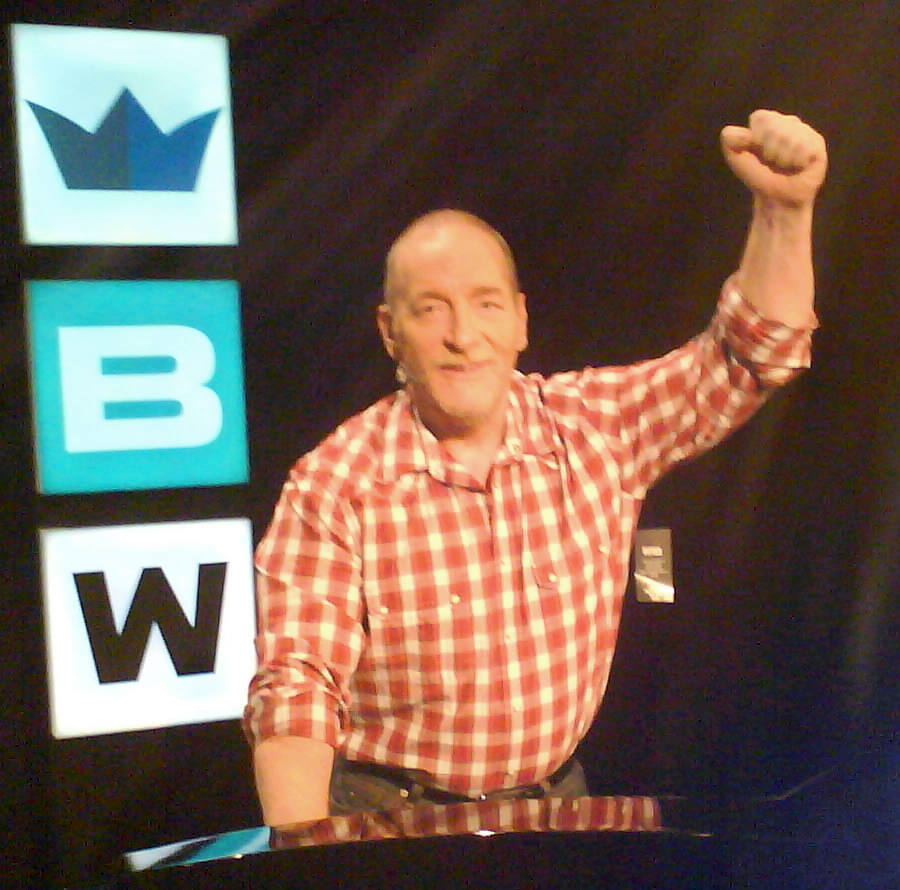
- Dahlgren in 2007

Personal information
- Full name: Folke Lennart Roland Dahlgren
- Nickname: Hoa-Hoa
- Nationality: Swedish
- Born: 4 May 1952 (age 72); Stockholm, Sweden
- Height: 172 cm (5 ft 8 in)
- Weight: 102 kg (225 lb)

Sport
- Sport: Weightlifting
- Club: Stockholms AK

Folke Lennart Roland Dahlgren (born 4 May 1952) is a retired Swedish heavyweight weightlifter. He placed 11th at the 1976 Olympics and sixth at the 1977 and 1978 world championships.
