= Elisabet Höglund =

Swedish radio and television journalist, author, activist, cyclist, artist (born 1944)

- Born: 29 August 1944 (age 82); Gothenburg, Sweden
- Occupation: Journalist
- Website: http://elisabethoglund.se/ (in Swedish)

Elisabet Höglund (born 29 August 1944) is a Swedish author and political journalist, working in Swedish television and radio as a reporter. She started her career at SVT, later becoming a freelance journalist. She has written a number of books including an autobiography, and has organised many exhibitions of her own paintings; she is also a former road bicycle racer. She competed in Let's Dance during 2009 on TV4, teaming up with professional dancer Tobias Karlsson. Höglund and Karlsson placed fourth in the competition.

== Career ==
=== Early life ===
On 12 October 2010, Höglund's biography En kvinna med det håret kan väl aldrig tas på allvar ("Surely a woman with that hairstyle can't be taken seriously") was released. When Höglund was four, her mother became very sick and had to be hospitalised. She could no longer take care of Höglund and her sister; her father worked late-night shifts at the post office so he could not take care of the children full-time. Both were placed in an orphanage, where she was severely bullied. After a year at the orphanage, the two girls were returned to their parents.

=== Journalist ===
Höglund began her journalism career in 1970 at Västgöta-demokraten, the local newspaper in Borås. In 1977, she moved to Stockholm, where she worked as a press ombudsman for the Swedish Trade Union Confederation. Between 1981 and 1983, she worked at Veckans Affärer as a business reporter until she was hired by Sveriges Television (SVT), also as a business reporter. In 1987, she started to appear as part of the SVT news programme Rapport, where she worked as a financial reporter and a political reporter. In the summer of 1996 she became a European correspondent for the programme, and was based in Brussels. In 2000, Höglund returned to Sweden, where she continued to work with Rapport and also Aktuellt, SVT's other major news programme. During her years as a European correspondent for Rapport, she and her husband lived in Waterloo, Belgium. Höglund has also worked on other SVT programmes such as Uppdrag granskning, Reportrarna and Studio 24, all of which have more of a focus on investigative journalism.

During this time, she also worked at Sveriges Radio and their stations P1 and P4, where she hosted programmes such as Ring P1. She also hosted her own show Elisabet Höglund möter... on P4. After having worked for the SVT network for 25 years, and after serving as Rapport's correspondent to the Middle East stationed in Amman, Jordan, Höglund quit her job at SVT in 2008 to become a freelance journalist.

During 2008 and 2009, Höglund also wrote articles for the evening tabloid Expressen, and since 2009 has been writing a weekly segment for Aftonbladet. During late 2009 and early 2010, Höglund hosted the TV4 show Förkväll. She was fired from the job by TV4 in the winter of 2010 for unspecified reasons.

=== Artist and author ===
In addition to her journalistic work, Höglund is also an artist and author. As of 2013 she has written four books, and she has been painting for most of her life. Höglund has painted in oils since she was 12 years old and has had about 70 art exhibitions showing her work in Sweden. Amongst the places where her work has been displayed are Stockholm, Gothenburg, Västerås, Landskrona, Tällberg and Kungsbacka. Höglund is interested in gender and equality questions. She has stated, however, that she does not think of herself as a feminist.

=== Bicycle racer ===
Höglund is a former road bicycle racer, and won the gold medal at the Swedish championships in 1971 and 1972. She cycled for IF Ymer in Borås, for whom she won the Swedish championships in team cycling in 1971, 1972 and 1973. Her team partners during the first two years were Meeri Bodelid and Monica Bengtsson. In 1973 she won team gold medals along with Marja-Leena Andersson and Solvej Carlsson.

== Awards ==
During her career in journalism Höglund has received a number of awards and honours. In 1986, she was awarded the Best Business Reporter by the Swedish local council.

In November 2009, Höglund was awarded Guldkrattan (The Golden Rake) by Resumé magazine and in February 2010 she was named "2009 Mappie of the Year" by Amelia Adamo's magazine M–Magasin.

During 2010, Höglund was also nominated for Best Television Personality of 2010 by Finest.se. This was after she competed in the celebrity dancing competition Let's Dance during 2009 on TV4. She and her partner, professional dancer Tobias Karlsson, placed fourth.

== Health ==
Höglund is a cancer survivor. She has fought off the disease twice, and undergone two major cancer surgeries.

== Bibliography ==
- Storkonflikten i den politiska debatten (1981)
- Kvinnans lilla deklarationsbok (1986)
- Kvinnan, familjen & lagen (1990)
- En kvinna med det håret kan väl aldrig tas på allvar (2010)
- Nattens änglar – min kamp mot cancern (2012)
