= Thomas Nordegren =

Swedish journalist and writer (born 1953)

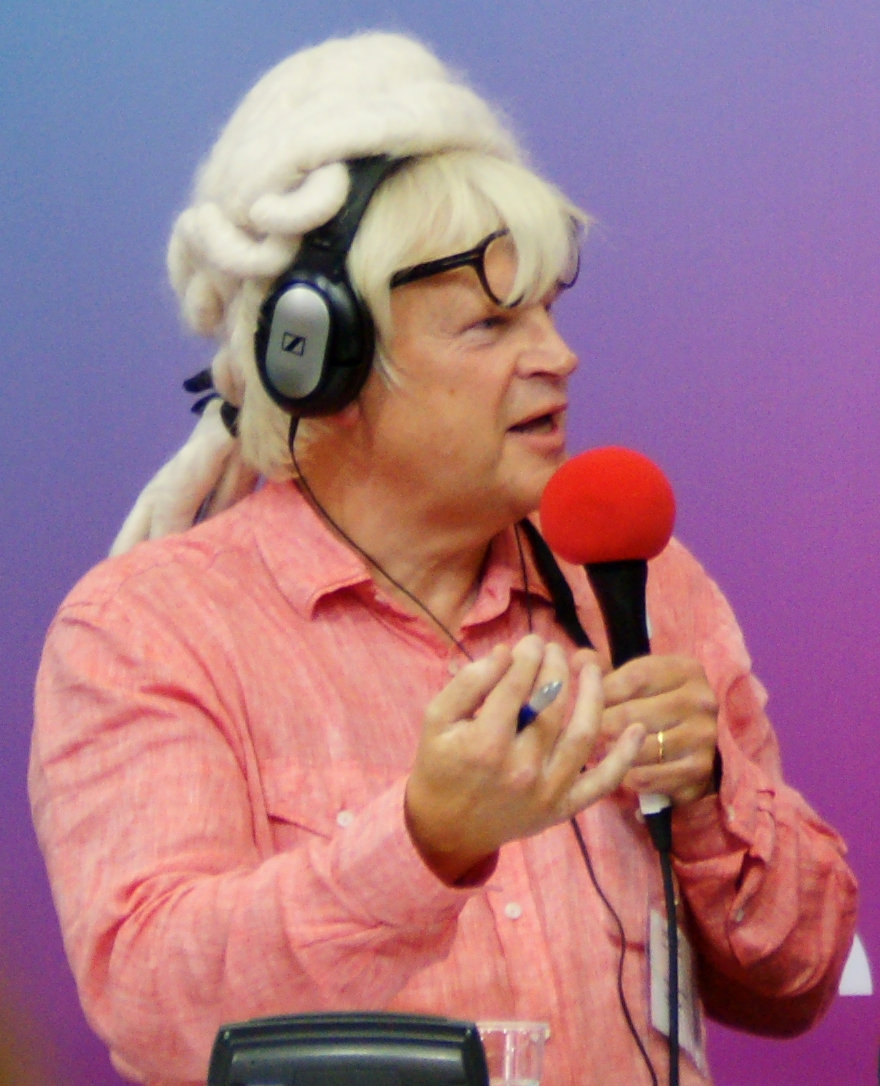
Nordegren at Gothenburg Book Fair in 2016, wearing a wig for the 250th anniversary of the first Swedish Freedom of the Press Act

Carl Axel Thomas Nordegren (born 20 February 1953) is a Swedish journalist, writer and radio host.

== Biography ==
Nordegren was born in Helsingborg. In the 1970s, he was employed at the National Board of Health and Welfare as a specialist on drug addiction issues, and also wrote several books on the topic. He then started working as a journalist, first for Sveriges Television, and then for the newspaper Dagens Nyheter, before being recruited by Sveriges Radio. In 1988, he was a visiting professor at New York University, lecturing on European journalism.

Between 1997 and 2001, he worked as a foreign correspondent for Sveriges Radio in Helsinki, Brussels, and later in Berlin, and then in Washington, D.C. between 2003 and 2007. From 2008, he led a talk show on current affairs in Sveriges Radio P1, Nordegren i P1; from 2011 until his retirement in 2023 he led the talk show together with Louise Epstein, with the name Nordegren och Epstein i P1.

=== Personal life ===
From the mid-1970s, Nordegren had a relationship with the politician Barbro Holmberg, who would later serve as Sweden's Minister for Migration between 2003 and 2006. Together they had three children, among them Elin Nordegren, who was married to American golfer Tiger Woods between 2004 and 2010.

Between 1989 and 1999, Nordegren was married to fellow journalist Carin Ståhlberg, daughter of Swedish chess grandmaster Gideon Ståhlberg; together they have two sons, born in 1989 and 1992. In 2003, Nordegren married the writer and illustrator Anna Höglund, with whom he has one son (born in 1999) and one daughter (born in 2001).
