= Markström =

Markström is a Swedish surname. Notable people with the surname include:

- Elisebeht Markström, (born 1955), Swedish social democratic politician who has been a member of the Riksdag since 1995
- Hans Markström (born 1965), former ice speed skater from Sweden
- Jacob Markström (born 1990), Swedish professional ice hockey goaltender, currently playing for the New Jersey Devils
