= Jonatan Unge =

Swedish comedian (born 1979)

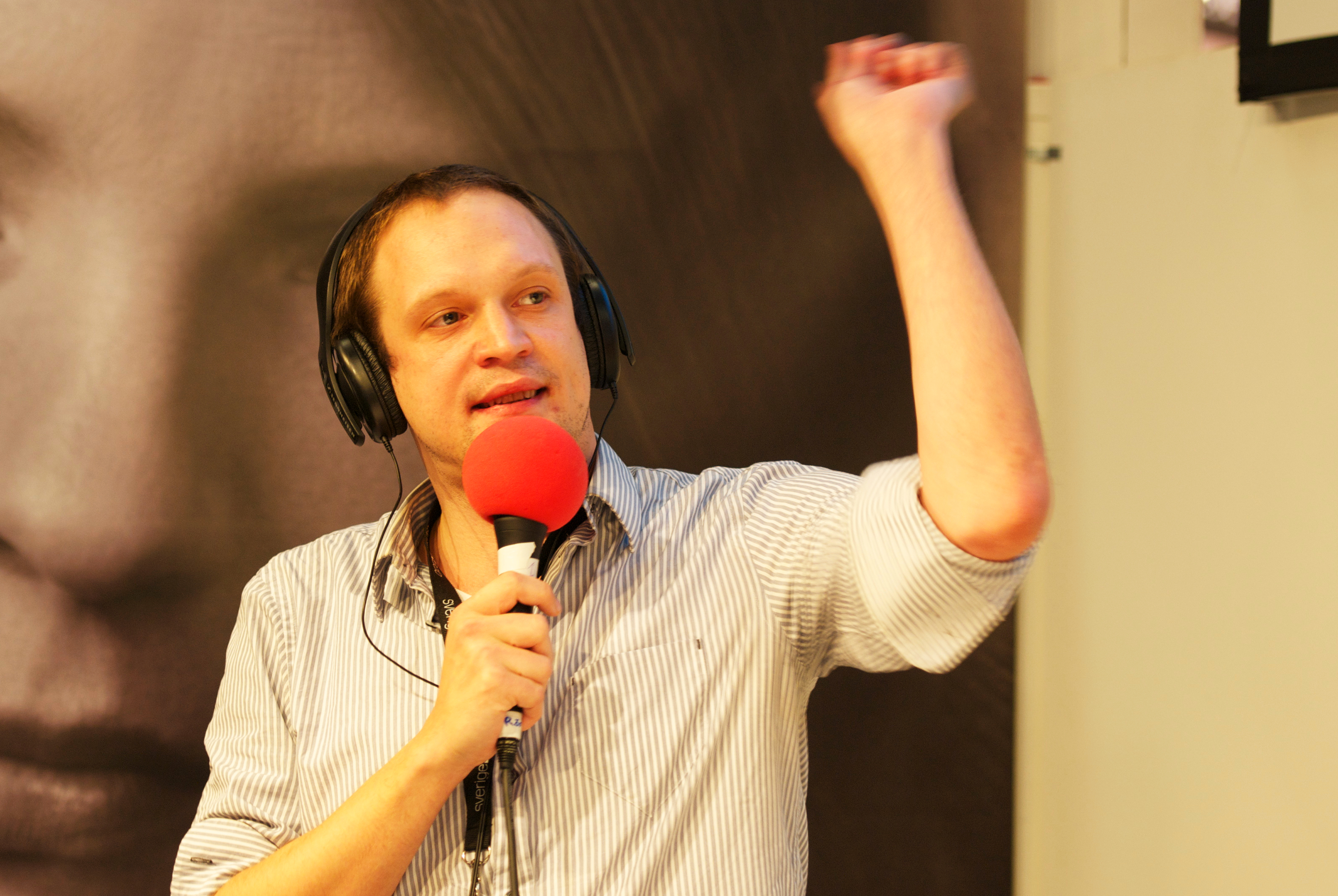
- Jonatan Unge in 2011
- Born: Jonatan Anders Unge; 4 January 1979 (age 47); Stockholm, Sweden

Jonatan Anders Unge (born 4 January 1979) is a Swedish stand-up comedian and television personality. He is the son of Ingemar Unge and Cecilia Hagen and grew up in Djurgården in Stockholm. His mother is a Jew and he himself joined the faith as a teenager, which is a part of his stand up routine. In 2009, he participated in Grillad on SVT, and in the summer of the same year he was part of Morgonpasset Sommar in Sveriges Radio, he has also been part of the Morgonpasset morning show. In 2021, Unge had the lead role in the SVT comedy series Drugdealer.

In 2021, he along with Cecilia Düringer won På spåret which was broadcast on SVT
