= Bengt Grive =

Swedish journalist (1921–2003)

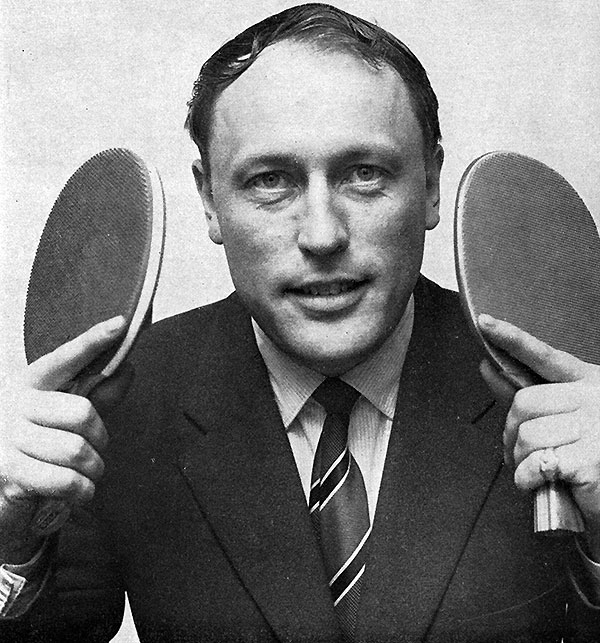
- Grive in 1959.
- Born: Bengt Edvin Axel Gustafsson; 21 March 1921; Stockholm, Sweden
- Died: 17 September 2003 (aged 82); Lidingö, Sweden
- Occupations: Sports commentator, journalist, writer
- Spouse: Martha Svensson (m. 1945)
- Children: 1

Bengt Edvin Axel Grive (born Gustafsson, 21 March 1921 – 17 September 2003) was a Swedish sports commentator, journalist and author.

== Early life ==
Grive was born on 21 March 1921 in Stockholm, Sweden, the son of Edvin Gustafsson and Elsa (née Lindström). Grive worked as a firefighter in Stockholm during a few years in the 1940s.

== Career ==
In his youth, he was part of the Swedish elite in table tennis, during a few years and won the Swedish championship in the sport in 1951.

Grive worked at Aftonbladet newspaper from 1951 to 1956, and performed as a variety show artist from 1953 to 1960. In 1960, he became a reporter for Sveriges Television, where he worked until 1990 when he became a freelance journalist. In 1993, he started working for Eurosport when the channel expanded its broadcast to the Nordics. He got to commentate both tennis and ski jumping. He also became a mentor for among others Chris Härenstam and Niklas Holmgren.

He is best known for commentating Björn Borg's tennis finals in Wimbledon during the 1970s and 1980s. He also commentated table tennis, figure skating and football.

== Personal life ==
In 1945, Grive married Marta Svensson (1923–2005), the daughter of Ivar Svensson, a merchant, and Linnéa (née Eriksson). They had one daughter, Madeleine Grive (born 1955), a journalist.

== Bibliography ==
- Grive, Bengt (1967). Pingis och alla tiders statistik [Ping pong and all-time statistics] (in Swedish). Stockholm: Norstedt. SELIBR 1982658.
- Swedish tennis: media guide. Gothenburg: Volvo in Sports. 1985–1989. SELIBR 4109602.
- Grive, Bengt; Tecknar-Anders (1989). Glitter och stänk [Glitter and splashes] (in Swedish). Helsingborg: Nordjem. ISBN 9174820192. SELIBR 7644125.
- Grive, Bengt; Tecknar-Anders (1991). Resor med mål [Travel with purpose] (in Swedish). Helsingborg: Nordjem. ISBN 9174820311. SELIBR 7644134.
- Grive, Bengt (1995). Blå gula guld: OS 100 år [Blue yellow gold: 100 years of the Olympics] (in Swedish). Helsingborg: Nordjem. ISBN 9174820427. SELIBR 7644144.
- Grive, Bengt (2001). "Personligt" [Personal]. Röster om Lars Forssell (in Swedish). Stockholm : ABF, 2001: 63–72. SELIBR 3340520.
