= Helena von Zweigbergk =

Swedish journalist, author and film critic

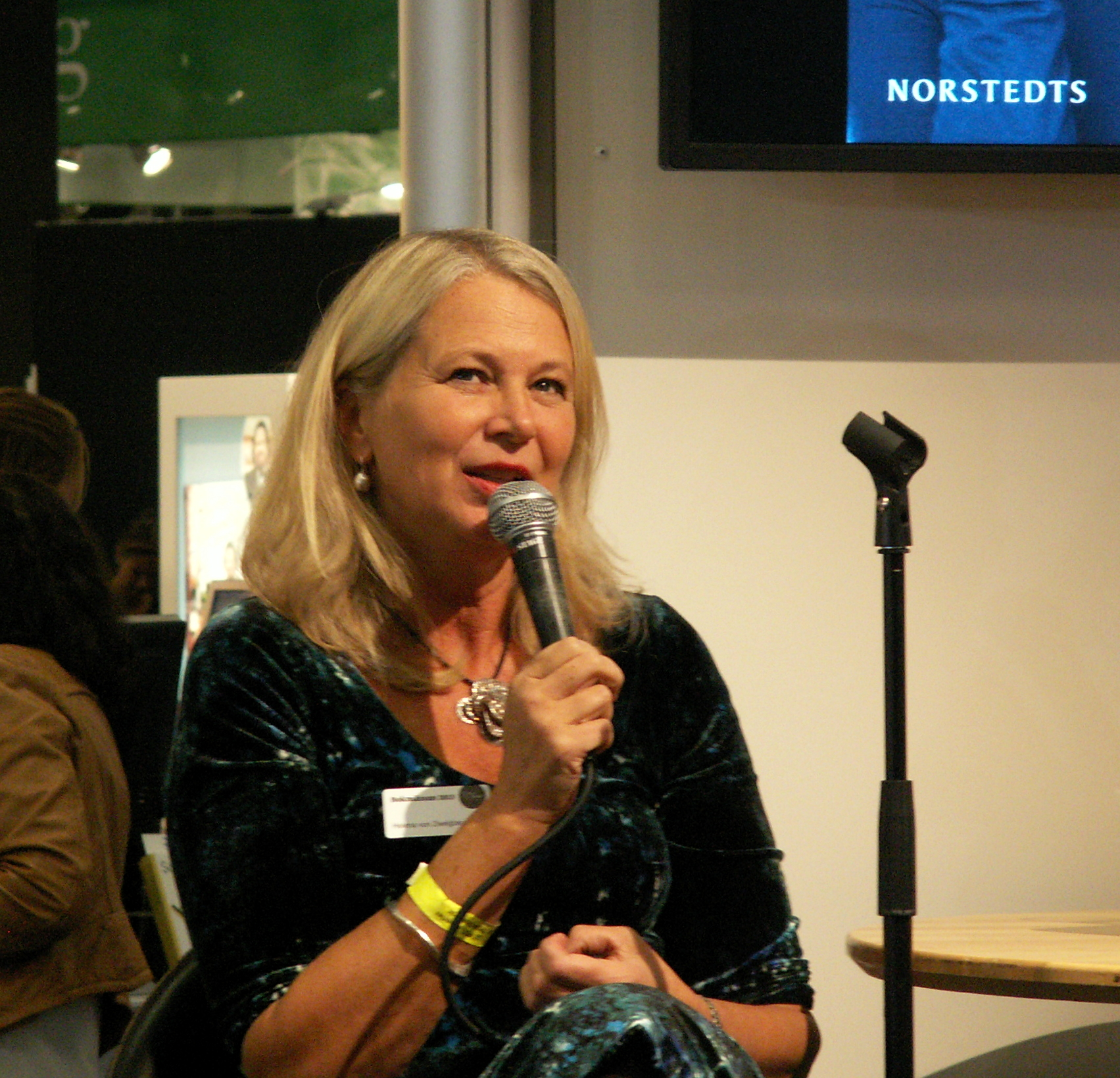
Helena von Zweigbergk

Helena von Zweigbergk (born 18 February 1959, Stockholm) is a Swedish journalist, author and film critic. She is known for the radio program, Spanarna, and SVT Filmkrönikan. She has written a number of crime novels around the character Ingrid Carlberg, a prison chaplain. In 2014, she won the competition På spåret.

== Selected works ==
- 1994 - Priset man betalar för att slippa kärlek (with Cecilia Bodström)
- 2001 - Måste vara en prinsessa (children's book, illustrated by Jens Ahlbom)
- 2001 - Det Gud inte såg
- 2003 - Kärleken skär djupa spår
- 2004 - Hon som bar skammen
- 2004 - Svarta diamanter: elva berättelser om liv och död (anthology together with Carina Burman and others)
- 2005 - Tusen skärvor tillit
- 2006 - Fly för livet
- 2008 - Ur vulkanens mun
- 2009 - Sånt man bara säger
- 2012 - Anna och Mats bor inte här längre
- 2013 - Än klappar hjärtan
