= Johan Wester =

Swedish comedian and actor (born 1967)

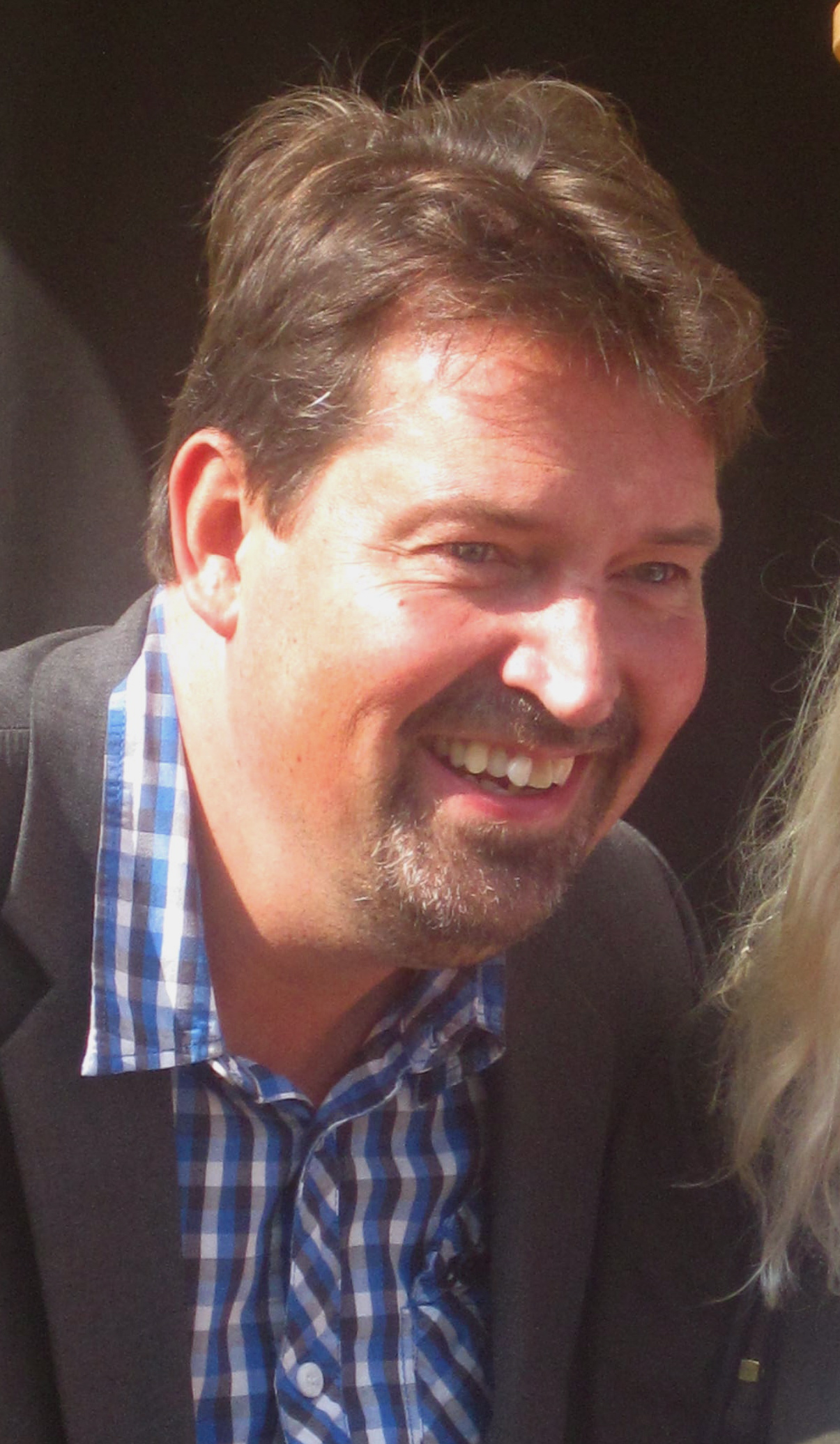
Johan Wester during the 2013 comedy festival in Lund.

Johan Wester (born 19 December 1967 in Lund, Sweden) is a Swedish comedian and actor.

Together with Anders Jansson he wrote and created the comedy sketch-show Hipphipp!. He has been a contestant in the Swedish TV game show På spåret three times and ended up as winner twice, 2007/2008 and 2008/2009.

In 2010 he acted in the Swedish production of Spamalot at Nöjesteatern in Malmö.

In 2012, he became the host for Intresseklubben, a Swedish version of the British panel show QI.
