= Ingvar Oldsberg =

Swedish television presenter and sports reporter (1945–2022)

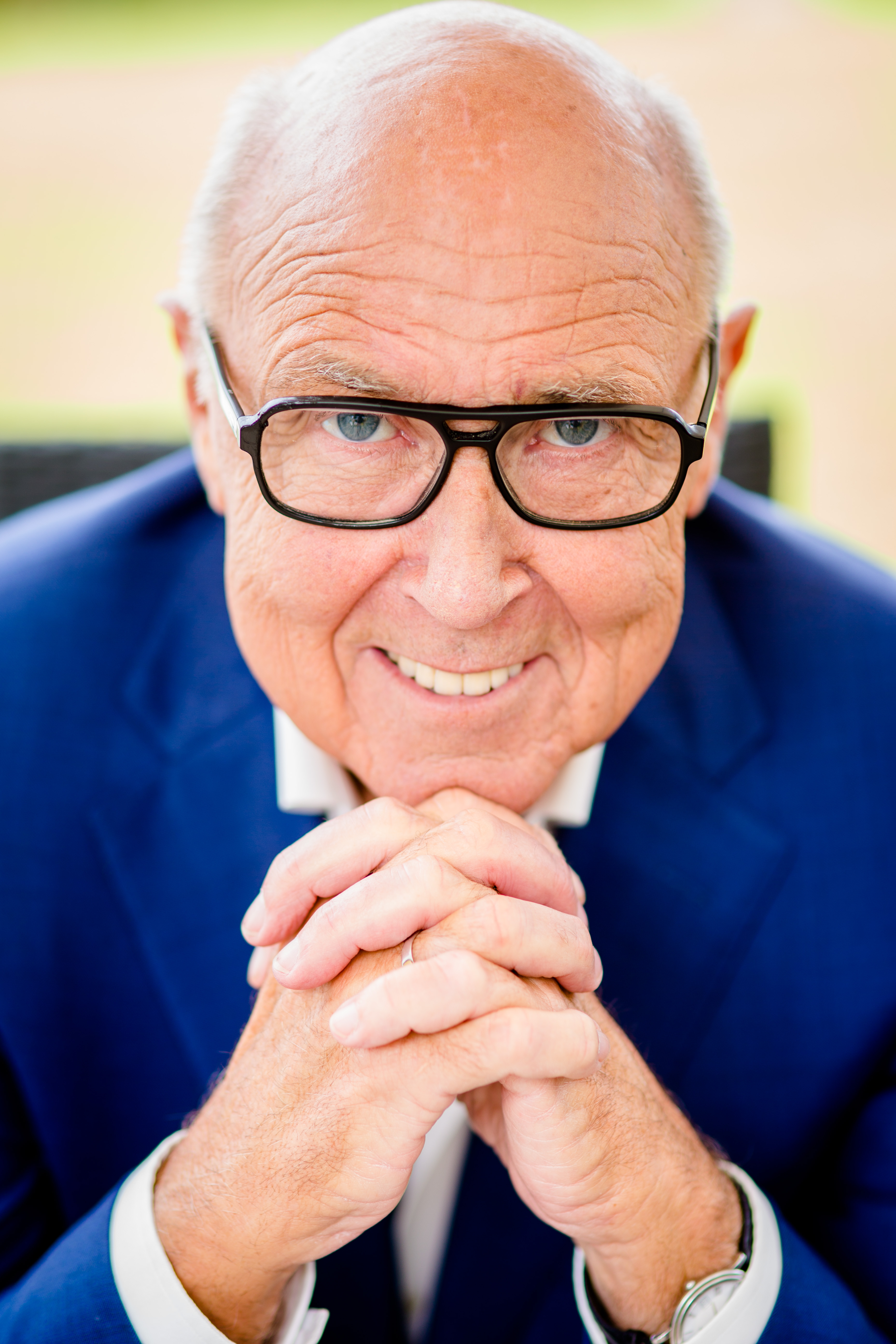
- Oldsberg in 2015
- Born: Ingvar Gunnar Oldsberg; 31 March 1945; Annedal, Sweden
- Died: 10 February 2022 (aged 76); Gothenburg, Sweden
- Occupations: Sports journalist, television presenter

Ingvar Gunnar Oldsberg (31 March 1945 – 10 February 2022) was a Swedish television presenter and sports journalist.

== Early life ==
Oldsberg was born on 31 March 1945 in Annedal Parish, Gothenburg. Oldsberg grew up in Mölnlycke outside Gothenburg. On his mother's side, he had Norwegian roots. He passed studentexamen in 1965 and then did military basic training in Älvsborg Regiment (I 15) in Borås as a medic.

== Career ==
He is best known for hosting På spåret between 1987 and 2009. In April 2014, Oldsberg was revealed as the new host of Bingolotto at Sjuan replacing Marie Serneholt.

== Personal life ==
Oldsberg lived in an apartment in Gothenburg. He also owned a house on Orust and an apartment in Costa del Sol, Spain. He has also owned the Baldersnäs manor in Dalsland. He has been married to Laila Oldsberg and Monica Oldsberg and cohabits with Gunilla Knutsson and Pauline Wood. From 2016 until his death, Oldsberg was engaged to hotel director Maria Sandeblad. He had three children; Staffan Oldsberg (born 1968), Karolina Oldsberg (born 1975) with Laila and Viktoria Oldsberg (born 1989) with Gunilla.

== Death ==
Oldsberg died of a heart attack on 10 February 2022, at the age of 76.
