= Eimhin (disambiguation) =

Eimhin was an abbot and bishop in c. 6th century Ireland.

Eimhin or variants may also refer to:

- Effin (Irish: Eimhín), a townland in County Limerick, Ireland
- Eimhin Cradock (born 1986), Irish drummer
- Eimhin Kelly (born 1998), Irish hurler
