= Paul von Praun =

German silk merchant & art collector (1548–1616)

Paul von Praun, Paulus II Praun, or Paolo Bruni (23 October 1548 – 18 July 1616) was a Nuremberg-born silk merchant and art collector. His collections of European art were extremely rich and important for the later study of art and consisted of many paintings by, or at least then attributed to,Michelangelo, Leonardo da Vinci, Albrecht Durer, Peter Brueghel the elder and others. The "Praunsche Kabinett" (Praun Cabinet) had more than 4,700 copper and wood engravings made in the 15th and 16th centuries.

Praun was the son of Stephans II and took up the family trade in silk beween Germany and Italy. The family was Catholic and moved from Nuremberg to Bologna. He was inspired to collect art after seeing the Dürer collection with Willibald Imhoff and the collections of Francesco Sampieri. His collections included the works of German artists Dürer, Baldung, Kulmbach, Cranach, Altdorfer, Huber, Burgkmair, Hirschvogel, Lautensack and Hoffmann and Italian artists such as Aspertini, de' Roberti, Parmigianino, Primaticcio, Sabbatini, Bagnacavallo, Orsi, Ligozzi, the Carracci and Faccini. The bronze sculptures that he collected which were included in catalogues are now untraceable. His cabinet was maintained by the family in Nuremberg and some of it was later sold off and went to other collectors.
