= Imhoff family =

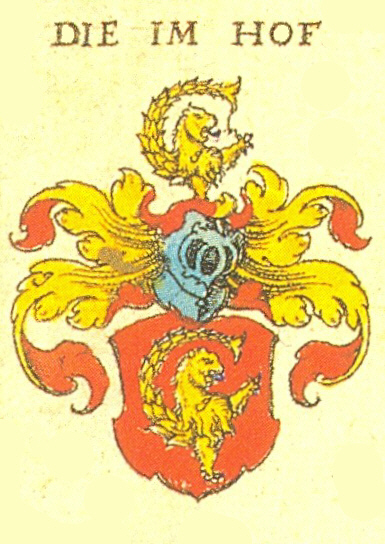
The Imhoff coat of arms

The Imhoff, Imhof or Im Hof family is a noble patrician family that belonged to the wealthy trading dynasties and ruling oligarchy in the Free Imperial City of Nuremberg during its Golden Age in the Renaissance. The Imhoff Trading Company was one of the most important European traders between the 15th and 17th centuries. It maintained branches and trade connections throughout Europe and financed European courts with loans.

== History ==
The family was originally from Lauingen where they belonged to the patrician families. Hans im Hof (c. 1260-1341) is the first mentioned member and Sigmund Imhof was mayor of Lauingen in 1277. The city belonged to the hereditary Duchy of the Hohenstaufen emperors. After the death of their last offspring, Conradin, in 1268, Lauingen fell to Louis II, Duke of Bavaria, following which a number of young patricians left the city, including Konrad and Hans II Imhoff, to settle in the free imperial city of Nuremberg. Hans II married Lucia Gross, a granddaughter of the famous Nuremberg patrician Konrad Gross, donator of the Heilig-Geist-Spital, and was accepted as a citizen and incorporated into the ruling Nuremberg patriciate. They were listed in the Dance Statute as new lines. The Nuremberg Imhoff family belonged to the circle of families that had an exclusive access to the Inner Council of Nürnberg, to which the family sent representatives between 1402 and 1806, with only short interruptions. The family was related to other protestant patrician families of Nuremberg like the Tucher or Haller.

The Imhoffs became prosperous through long-distance trade by supplying the markets and trade fairs in Frankfurt, Cologne, Strasbourg, in the Upper Palatinate and in Bohemia from Lauingen. The Nuremberg "Imhoff Trading Company" was first mentioned in 1381 in trade between Venice, Nuremberg and Eastern Europe. They worked closely together with other Nuremberg traders such as the Gross, Mendel, Pfinzing, Stromer and Pirckheimer families. Their retail range was extensive and mainly included spices, colors, precious metals, silk, canvas and cloth, wine, tobacco, leather and skins, weapons and Nuremberg handicraft products, the latter mostly in exchange (raw materials for finished goods). The family was also invested in the mining industry in Saxony and Silesia.

Hans IV Imhoff (d. 1499) founded a second trading company which, from the second half of the 15th century, concentrated on the trading centers of Western Europe. He had eight sons who not only maintained the older trading branches in Venice, Salzburg, Linz, Prague, Brno and Olomouc, but also founded new retail branches in Naples, Águilas, Messina, Lyon, Zaragoza, Lisbon, Antwerp and Amsterdam. In 1510 the Imhoffs founded a trading post in Bari, Italy, to ship Indian saffron via Venice to Germany. A brother of Hans V, Ludwig (1466–1533), went there and founded an Italian branch that remained in Bari until its extinction in 1719. In the saffron trade the Imhoffs became big competitors of the Tuchers. In 1505 three Imhoffs, as well as members of the Hirschvogel and Welser families, took part in an expedition on the first trade trip of Upper German merchants to India. Around 1500, the Imhoff expanded trading and barter into money and banking and became involved in silver and gold mining in Saxony and Silesia. From 1540 onwards they financed European courts with loans. Around 1520 they briefly had a monopoly on the trade in pepper and ginger from the Portuguese colony of Goa in India. Around 1565, the Imhoff trading company reached its greatest extent.

Hans V (1461-1522) also entered the banking business. He was a close friend of Willibald Pirckheimer, Lazarus Spengler, Albrecht Dürer, Adam Kraft and Eobanus Hessus, and supported them financially. His grandson Willibald Imhoff (1519–1580), also a grandson of Willibald Pirckheimer, became a famous art collector. He was portrayed by Titian, and after the death of Andreas Dürer (Albrecht's brother) Imhoff was able to acquire numerous works by Albrecht Dürer.

The Nuremberg Imhoffs continued to compete with the Tucher's trading company in the saffron trade until the 17th century, making it one of the last trading companies of the Nuremberg patricians that was active on a large scale. The Augsburg branch became quite influential too, however, unlike their Lutheran Nuremberg cousins, they were catholic. They provided several mayors to the city and were related to the Fugger family. The new Augsburg Town Hall was commissioned by mayor Hieronymus Imhoff (1575–1638) in 1609. He supported the Counter-Reformation and was therefore arrested by Swedish troops during the Thirty Years' War. The family also spread to Austria, as well as Saxony, Braunschweig, Hanover and the Netherlands. Through the acquisition of estates, individual family members were accepted into the imperial knighthood. Individual lines were raised to the status of imperial barons from 1679 onwards, the others to the status of Bavarian barons in the 19th century.

The Imhoff family donated numerous works of art in Nuremberg and elsewhere, including altars and paintings. The sacrament house in the St. Lawrence Church in Nuremberg by Adam Kraft, donated in 1493, is one of the major works of the German late Gothic period.

Imhof(f) is a common name in Germany, and not all persons named Imhoff belong to the patrician family. Several branches of the family still exist.

== Family members ==
- Andreas I Imhoff (1491–1579), merchant, treasurer of Nuremberg, keeper of the Imperial Regalia
- Willibald Imhoff (1519–1580), patrician and art collector
- Gustaaf Willem van Imhoff (1705–1750), governor of Ceylon and then the Dutch East Indies for the Dutch East India Company
- Amalia von Helvig, née von Imhoff (1776–1831), artist, writer, translator and socialite
- Sigmund von Imhoff (1881–1967), Generalmajor in the German military during the Second World War
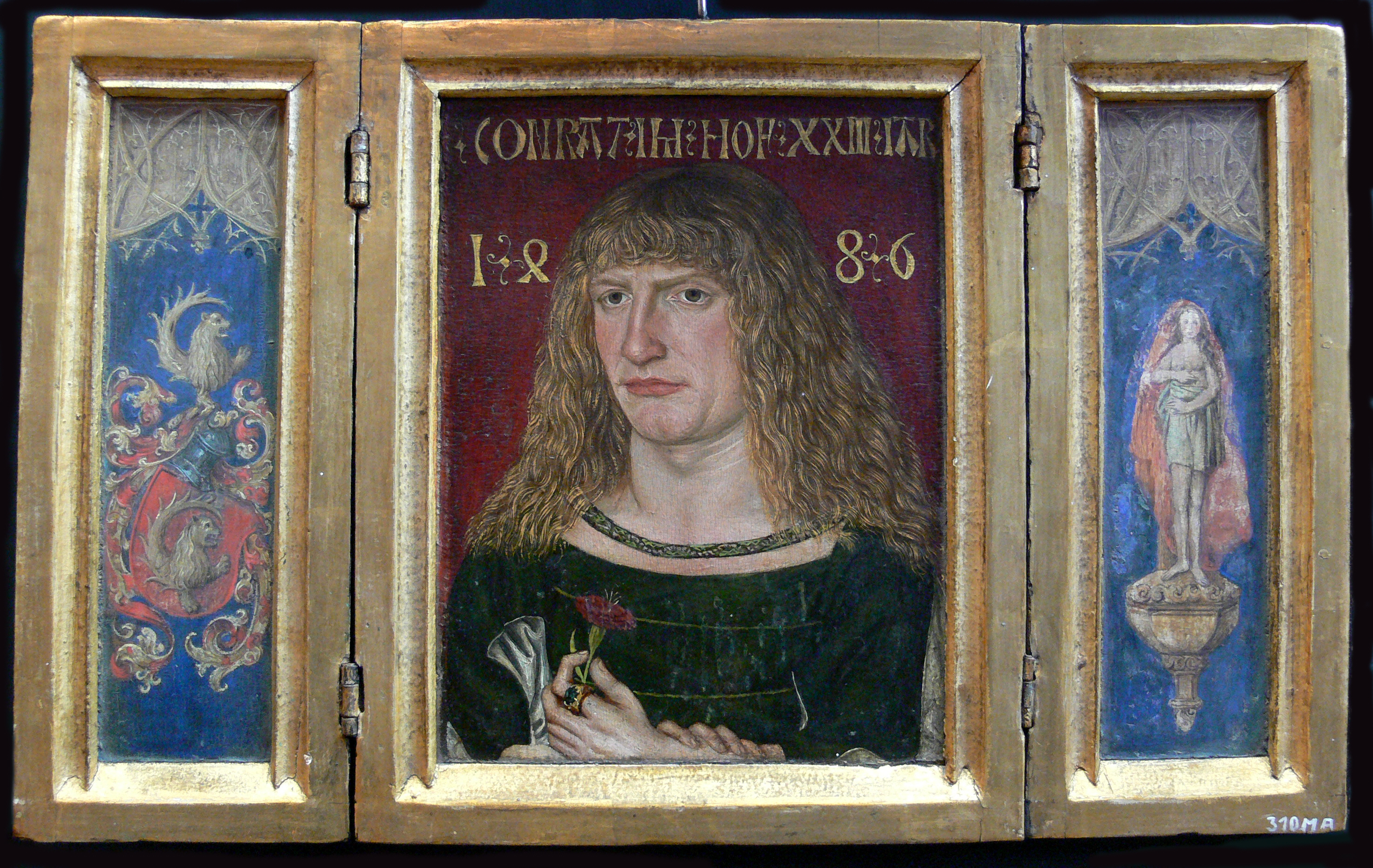
Konrad Imhoff (1486, by Jakob Elsner)

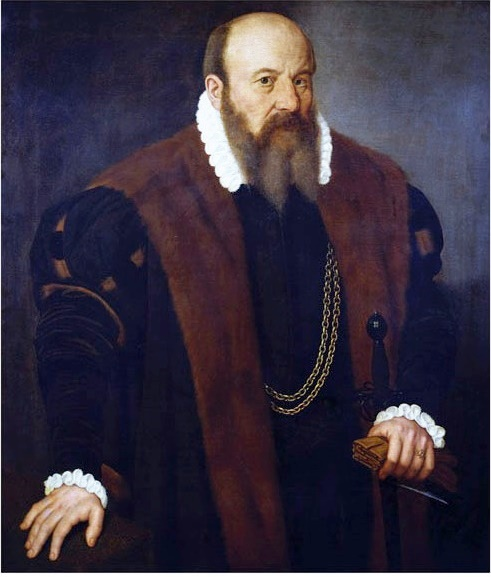
Andreas I Imhoff (1491–1579) (by Nicolas Neufchâtel, c. 1573)

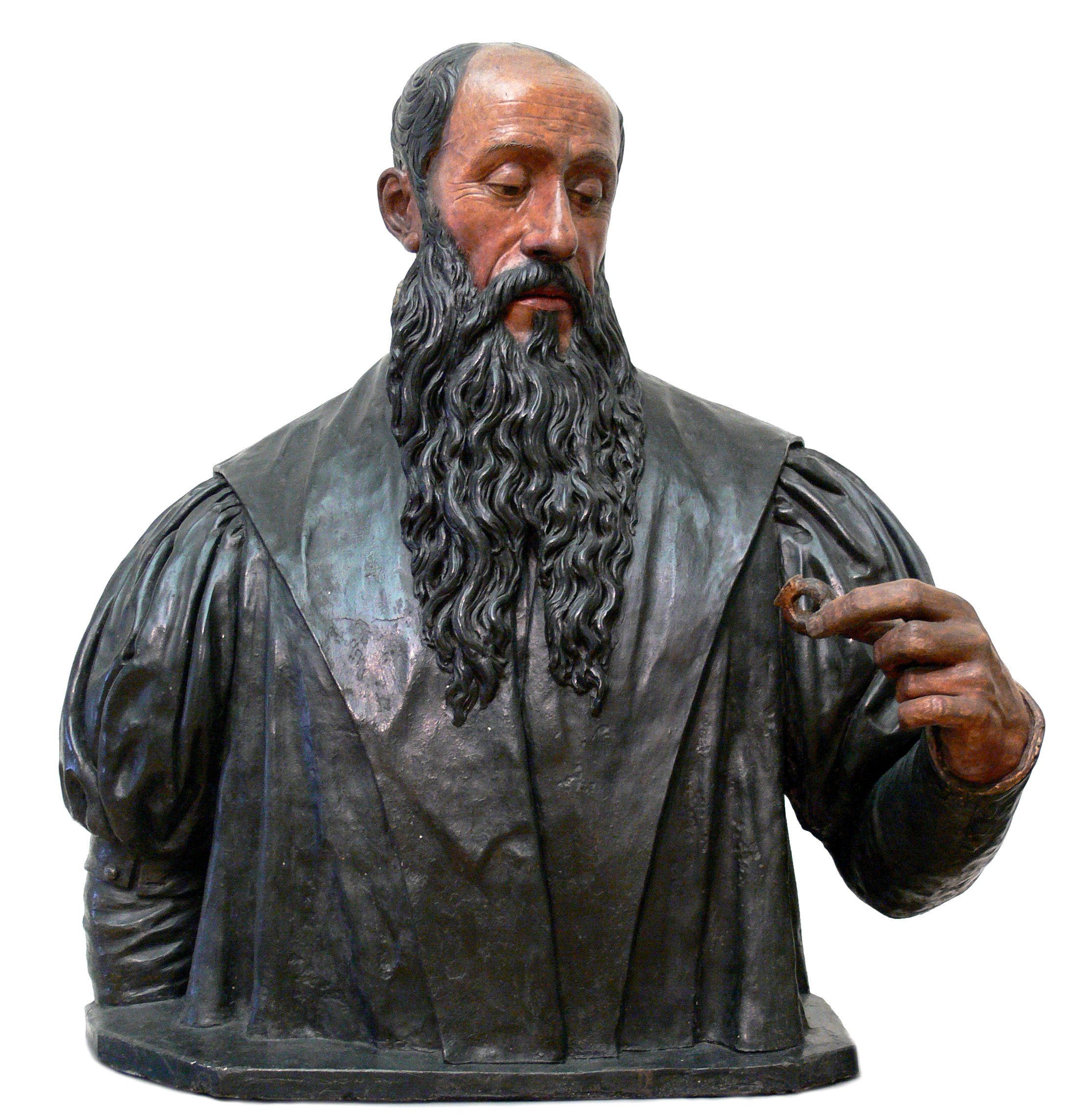
Willibald Imhoff (1519–1580)

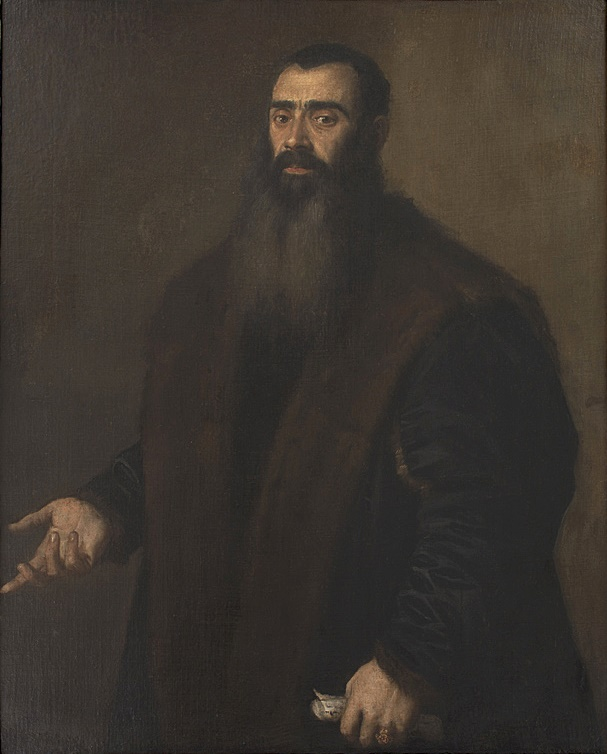
Willibald Imhoff (by Titian), before 1576

== Works of Art donated by the Imhoffs ==
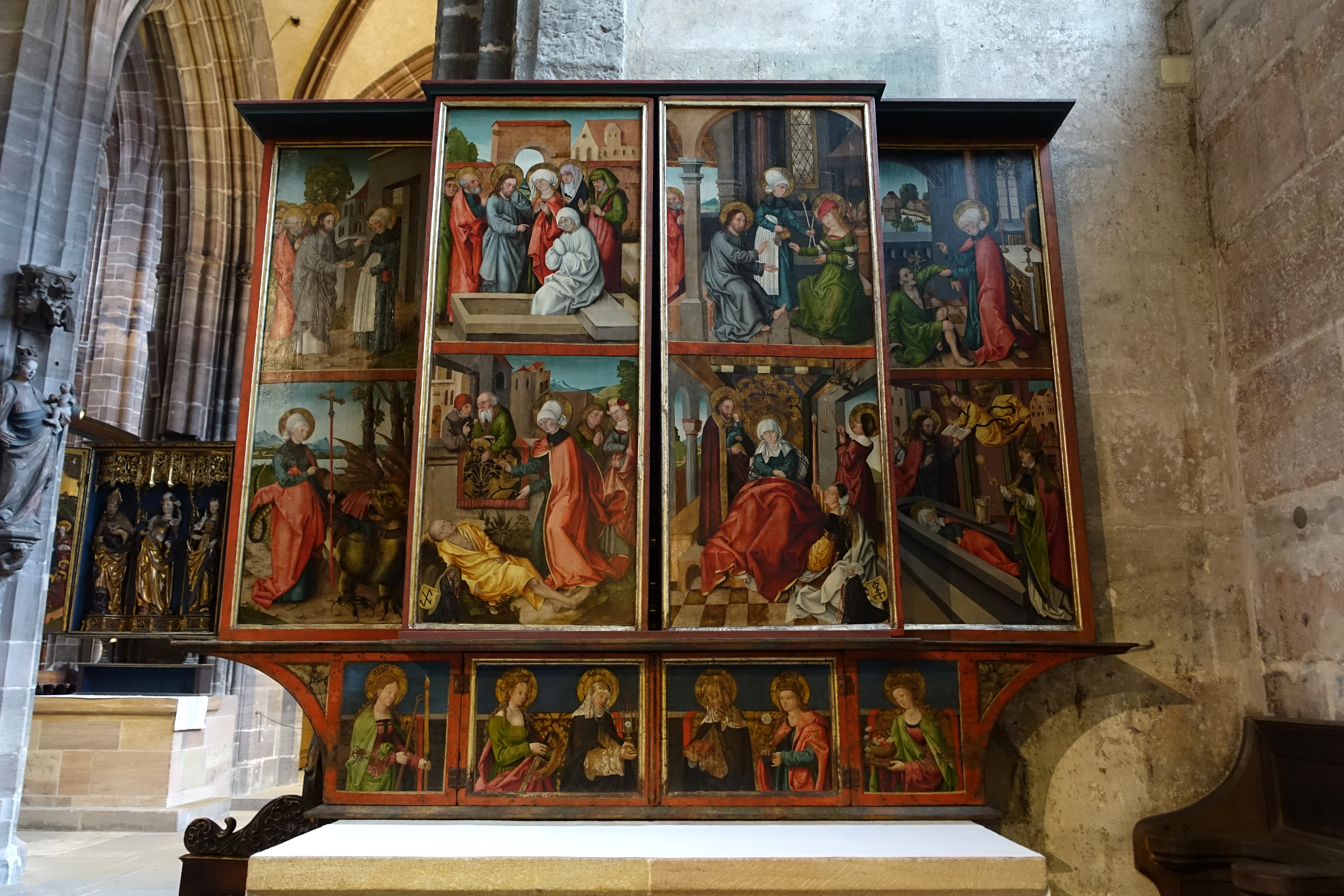
Imhoff Altar, St. Lorenz, Nuremberg (c. 1418)

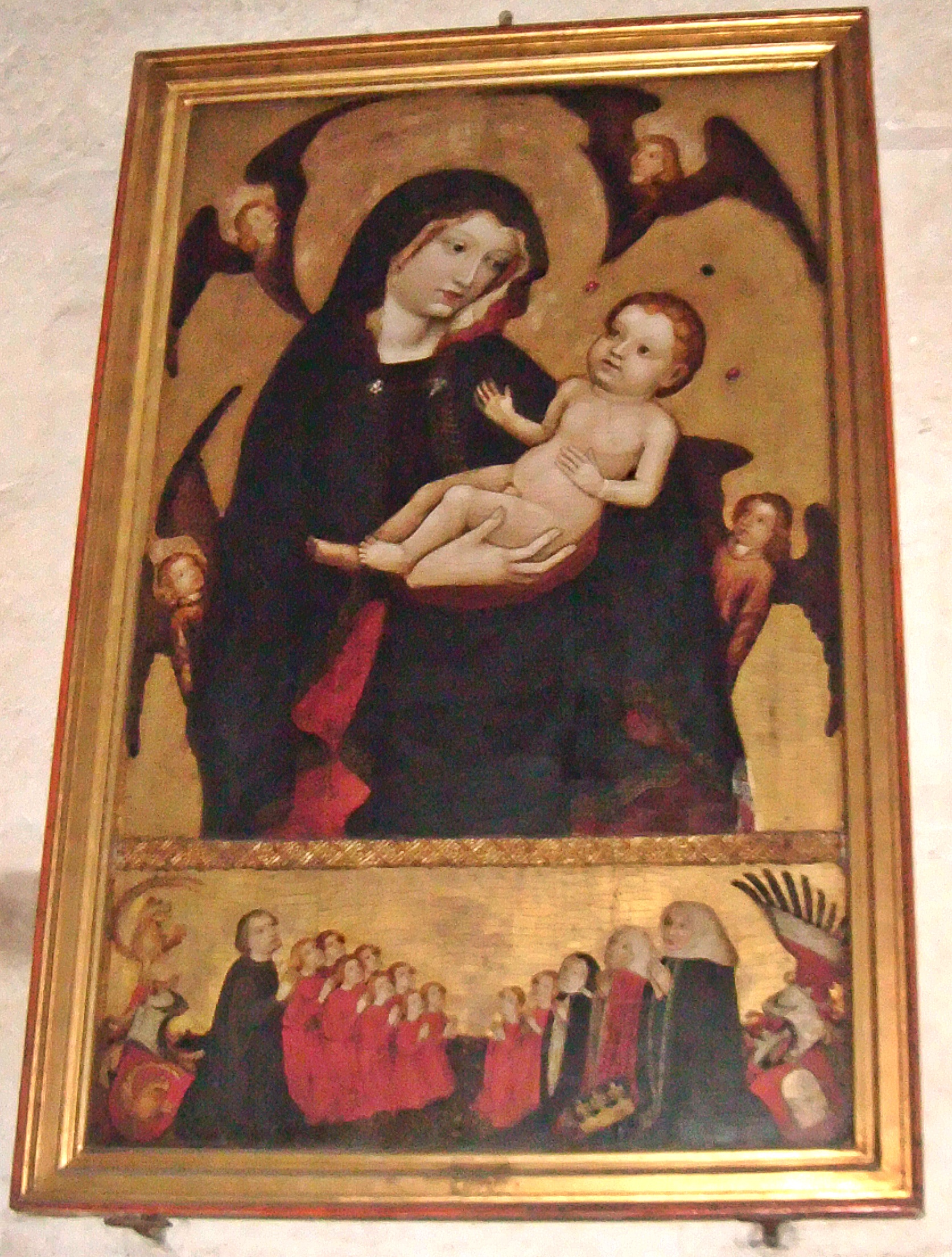
Imhoff Madonna, St. Lorenz (1450)

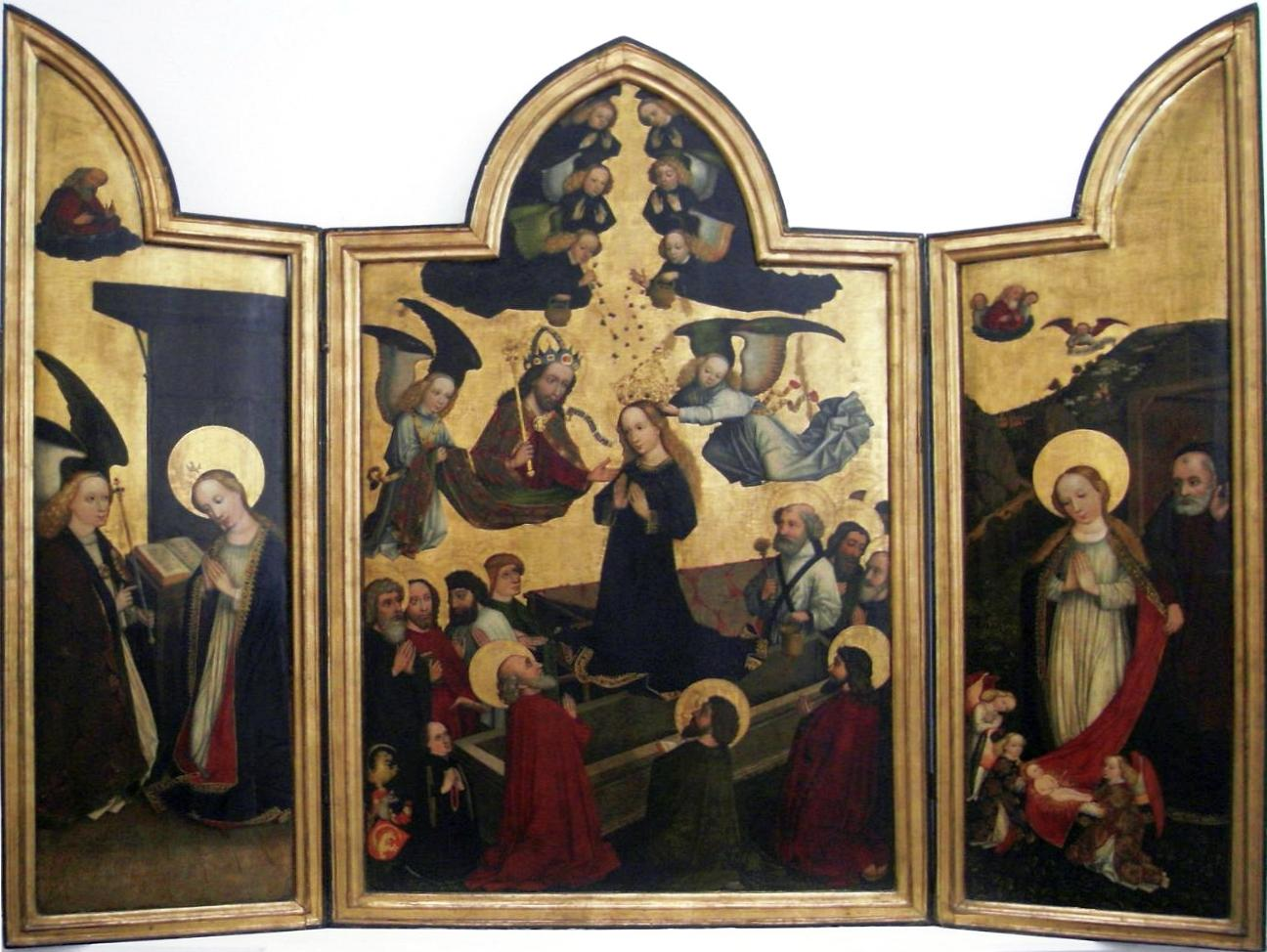
Imhoff Triptych by Valentin Wolgemut (c. 1455) for St. Elizabeth's Church, Wrocław

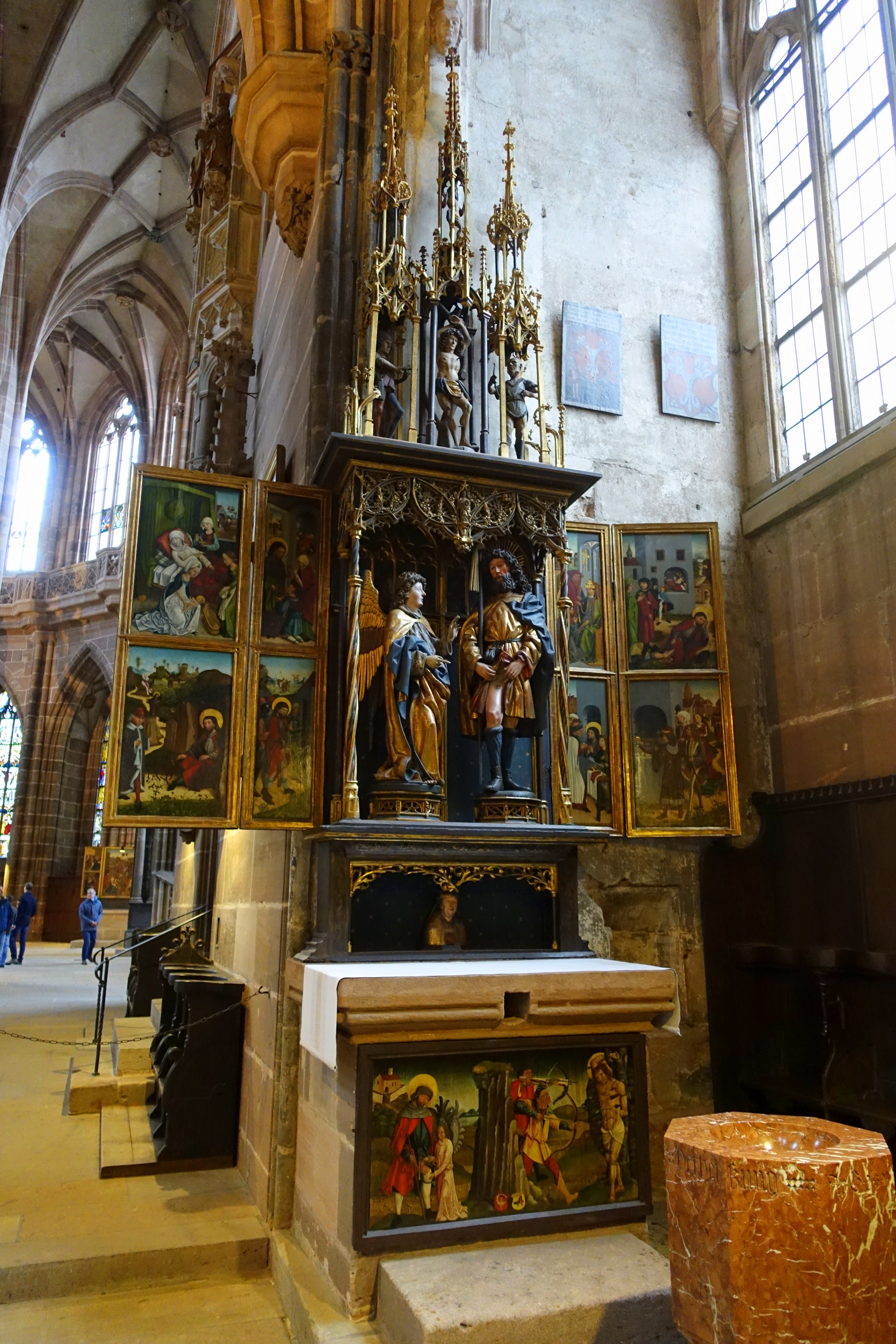
Rochus Altar, St. Lorenz (1483)

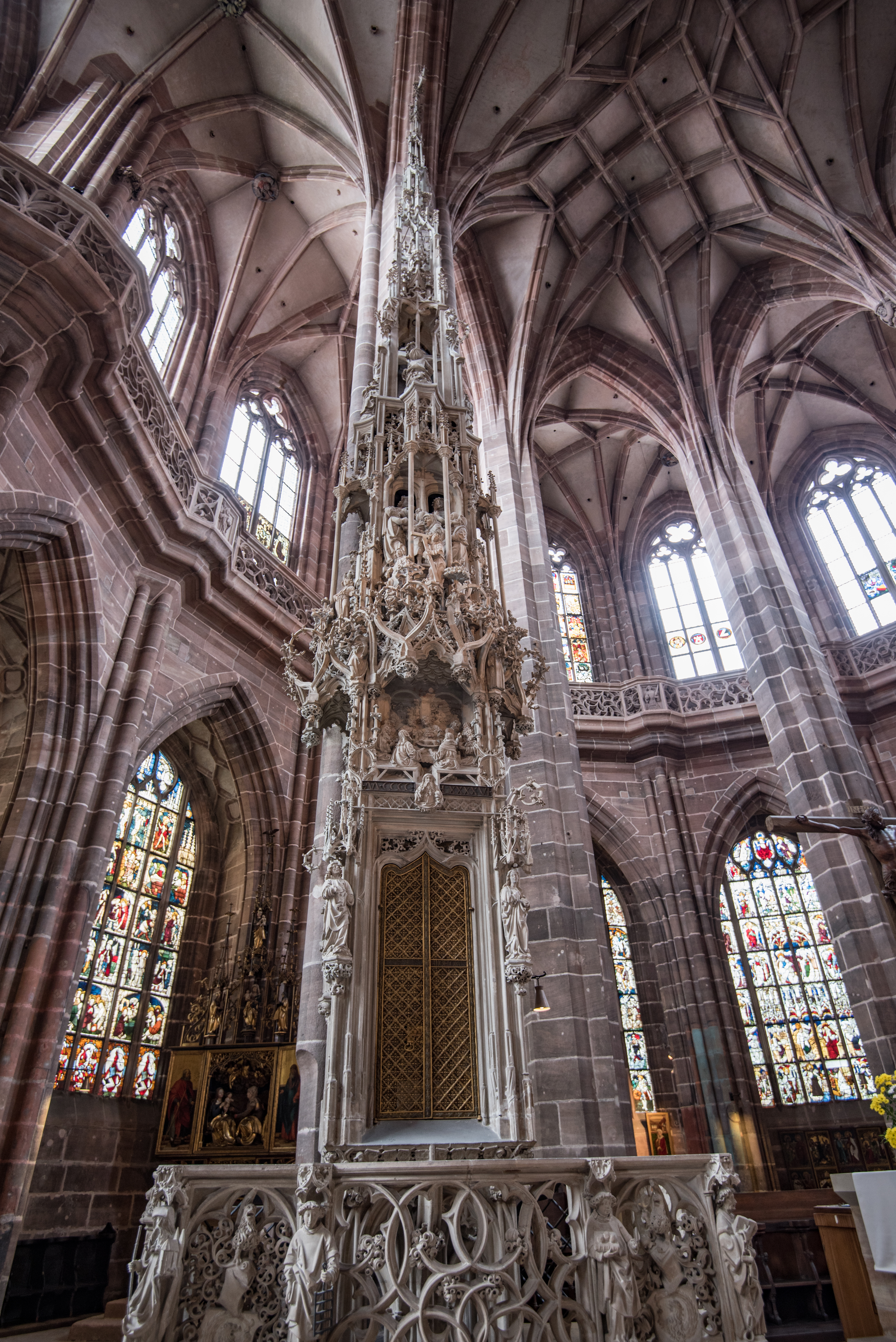
Sacrament house, St. Lorenz (1493)

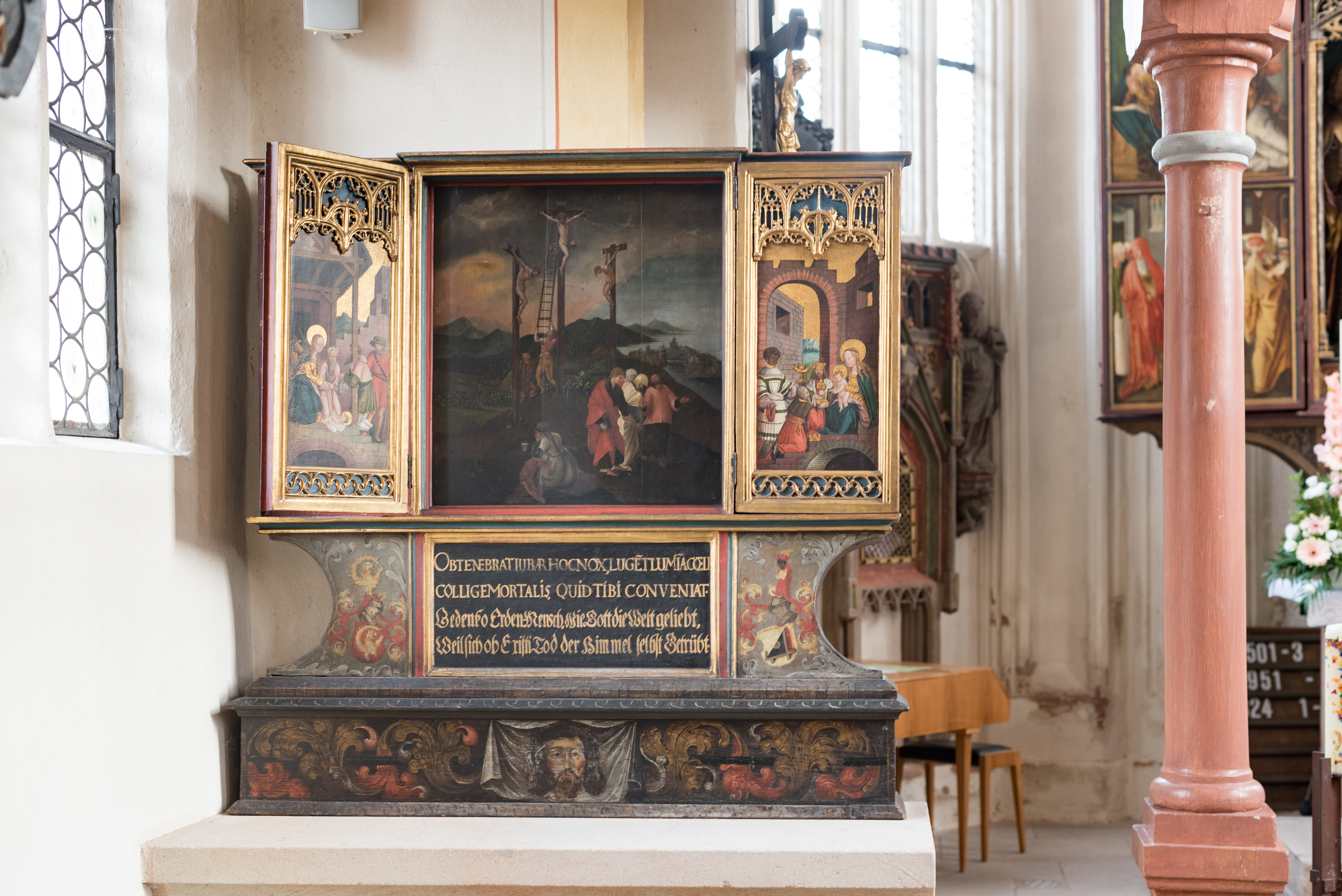
Altar at St John, Nuremberg (1517)

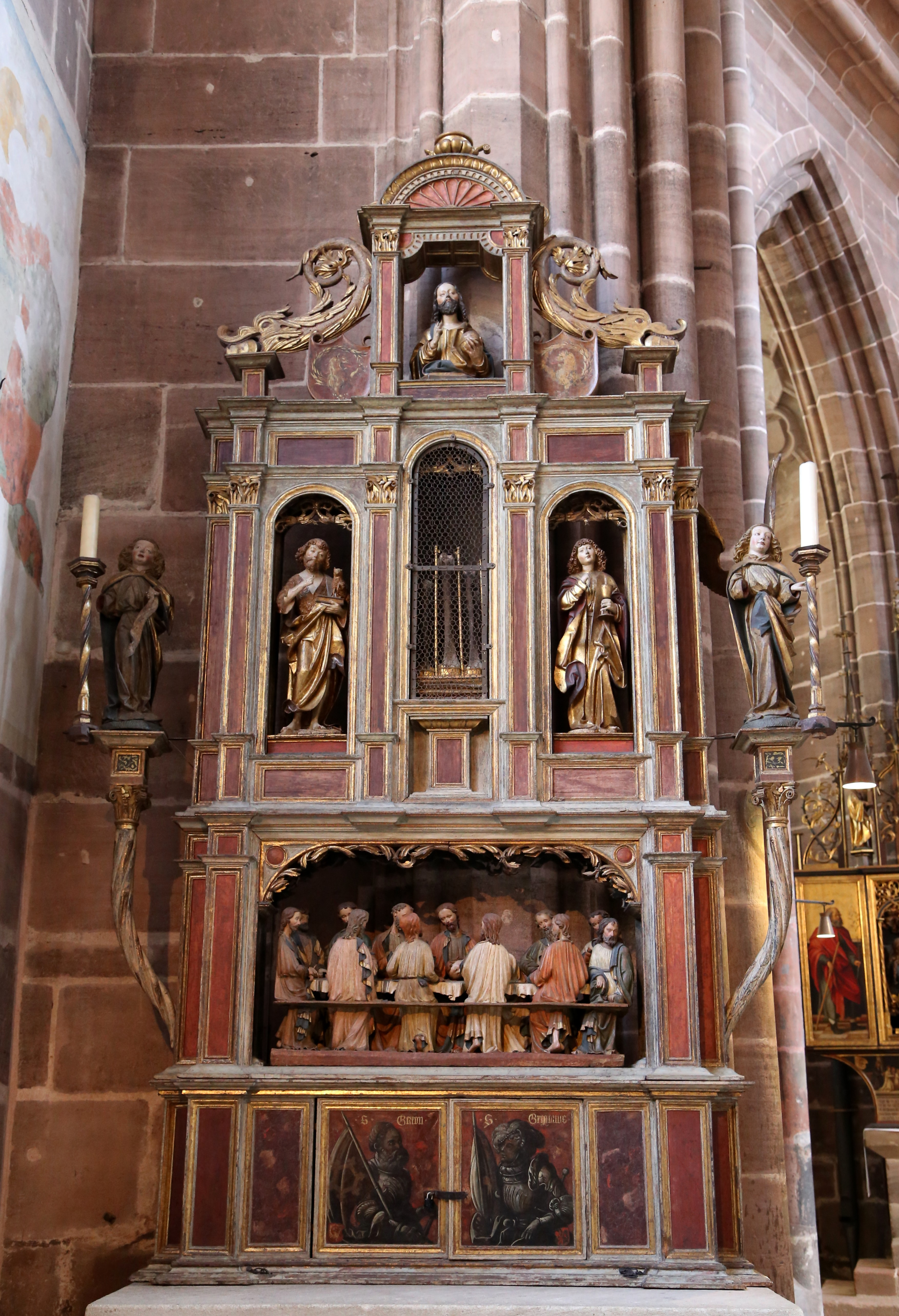
St John Altar at St Lorenz church (1520)

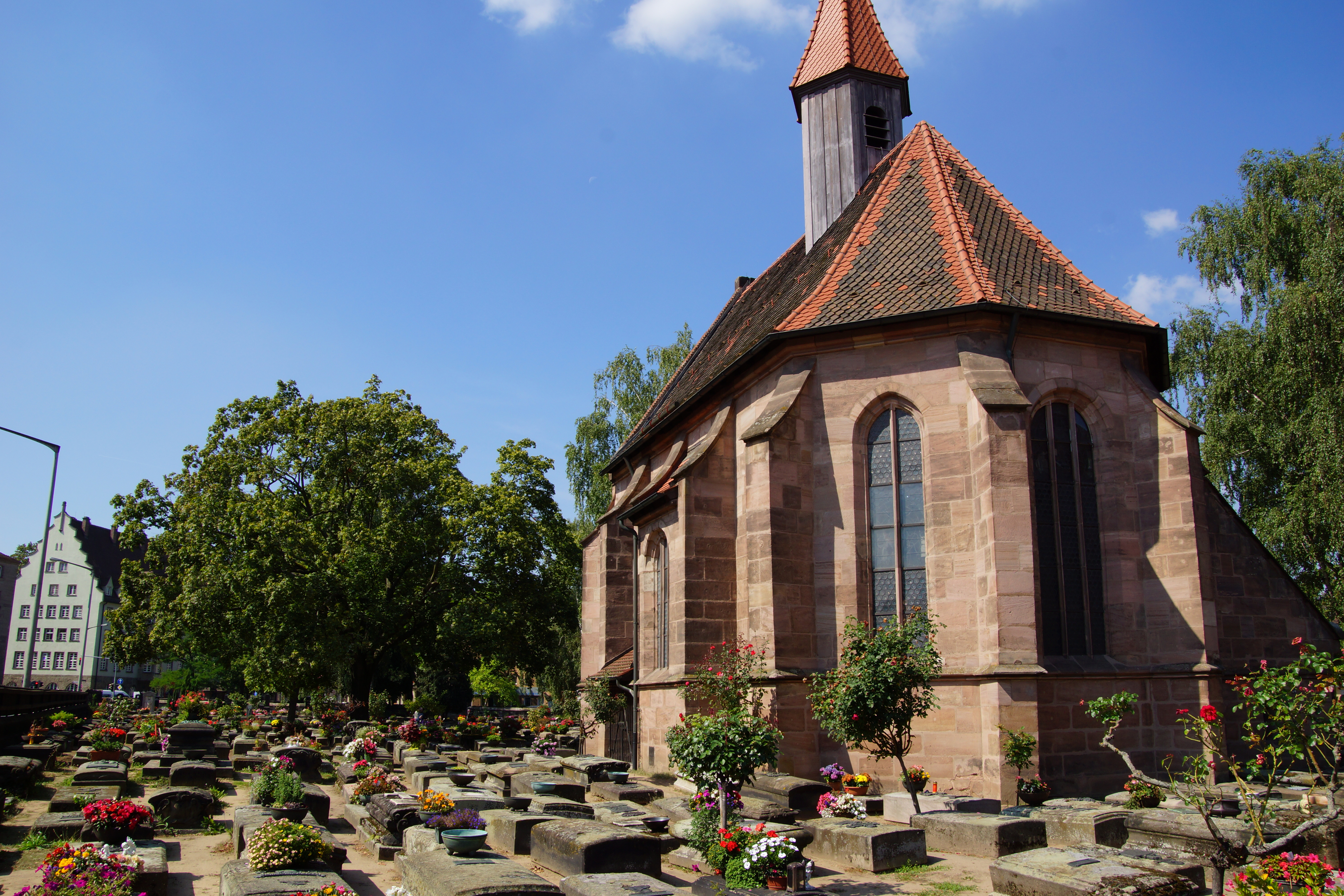
Rochus Chapel on Rochus cemertary, Nuremberg (1521)

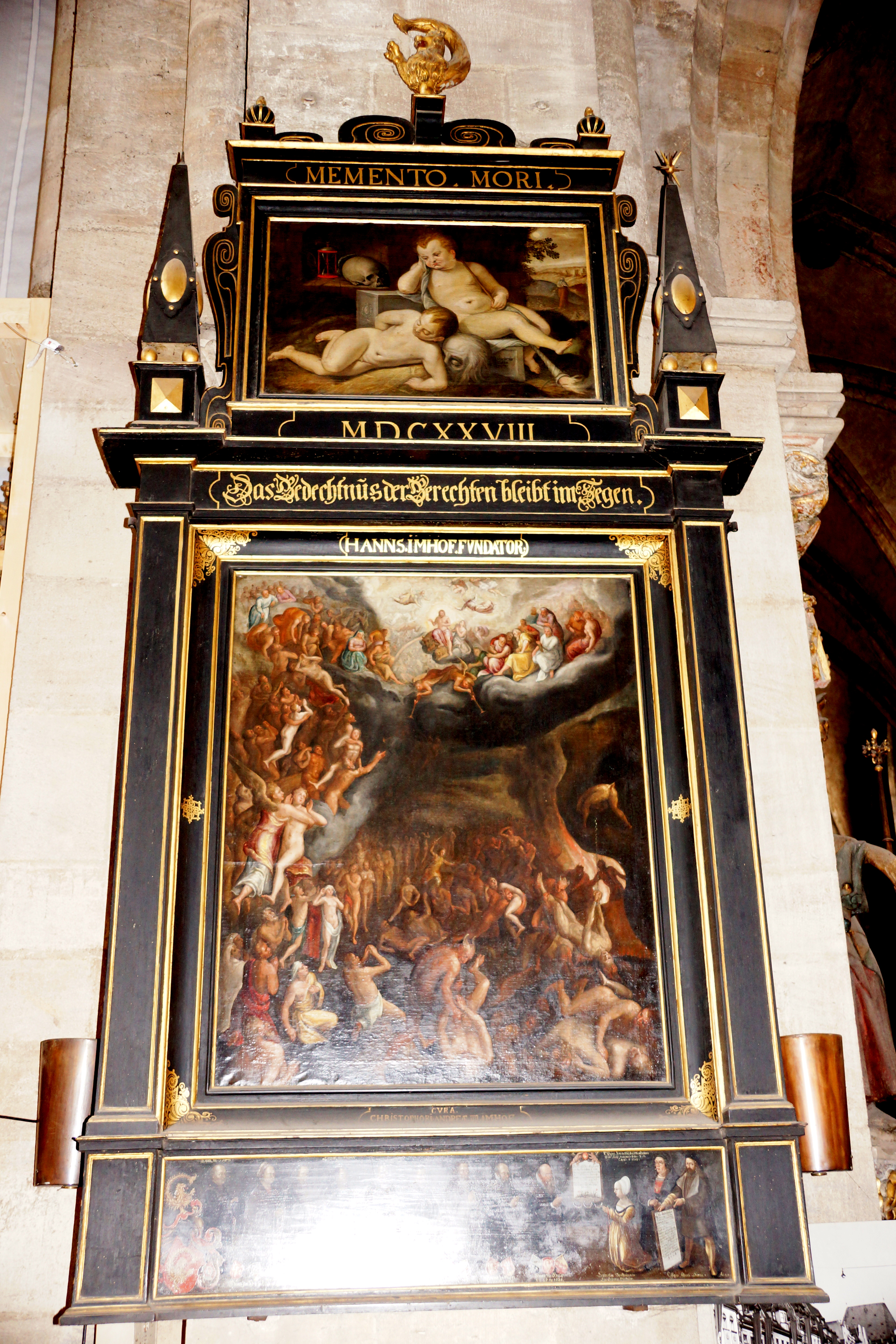
Last judgment, St. Sebaldus Church, Nuremberg

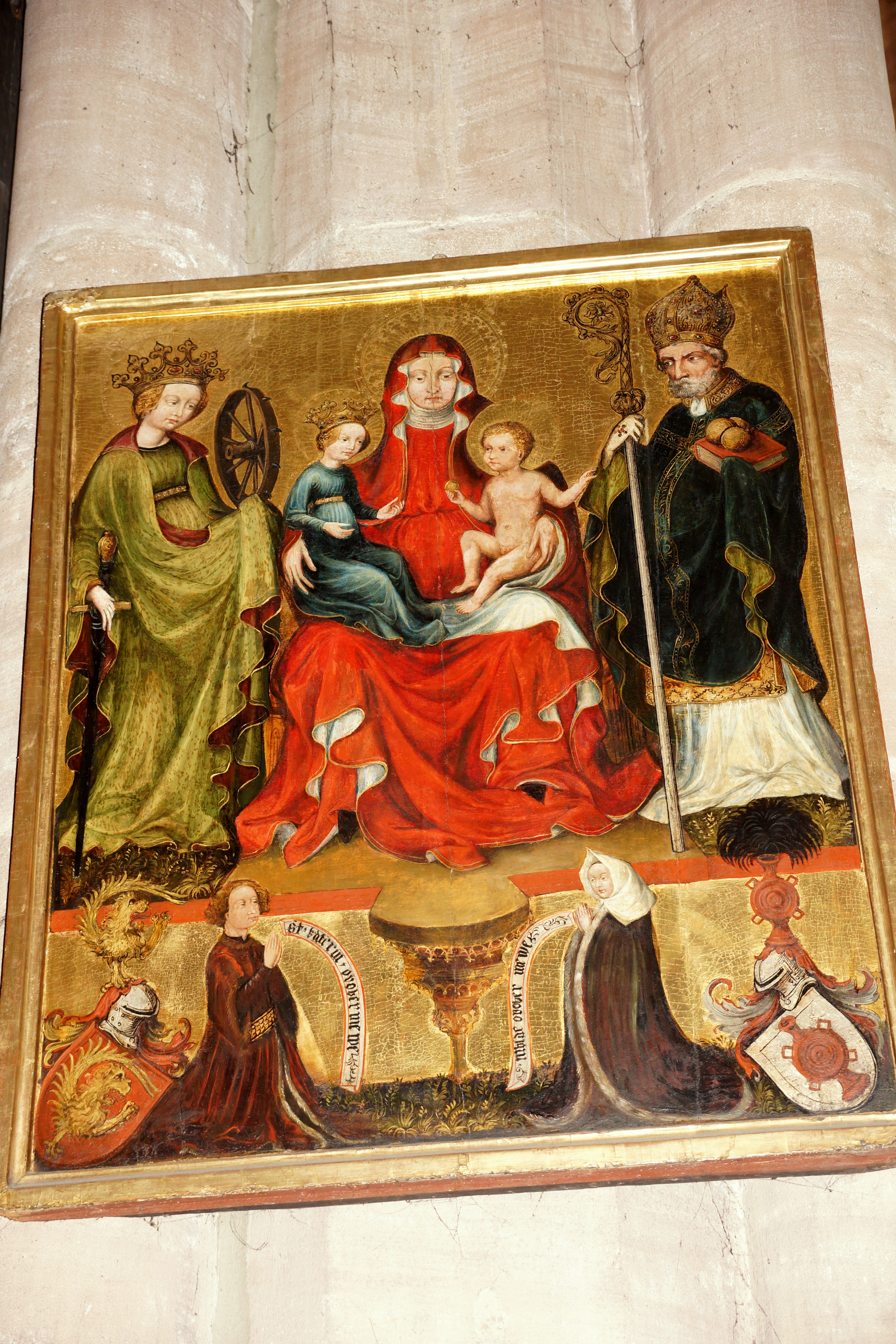
Holy Mary, St. Sebaldus (15th c.)

== See also ==
- List of banking families
