= Sigmund von Imhoff =

Hans-Sigmund von Imhoff
- Born: 30 June 1881; Metz
- Died: 7 July 1967 (aged 86); Farchant (Oberbayern)
- Military career
- Allegiance: German Empire; Nazi Germany
- Branch: Imperial German Army; Luftwaffe
- Rank: General der Bayerischen Landespolizei
- Conflicts: World War I World War II
- Awards: Ehrenkreuz des Preußischen Johanniter-Ordens

Sigmund von Imhoff (30 June 1881 – 7 July 1967) was a Generalmajor in the Luftwaffe during World War II.

== Biography ==
Wilhelm Maria Sigmund Heinrich, Freiherr von Imhoff, was born a member of the Imhoff family in Metz, Lorraine, on 30 June 1881. His father, Christoph Gustav Karl Sigmund was an officer at Metz, a border town of the German Empire.

Sigmund von Imhoff served as officer in the German Army during the First World War. After the War, von Imhoff served as officer in the Landespolizei Freistaates of Bayern, the Bavarian police. On 3 April 1933, Sigmund von Imhoff was promoted to the rank of Polizeigeneral, general in the police. His son, Sigmund, Major in the Heer, fell on the Russian front in August 1941. Sigmund von Imhoff was later seconded to the Luftwaffe, with the rank of Generalmajor.

Wilhelm Maria Sigmund Heinrich, Freiherr von Imhoff, died in Farchant, Oberbayern, on 7 July 1967.
