= Effin =

Townland in County Limerick, Ireland

Effin Eimhin
- Civil parish
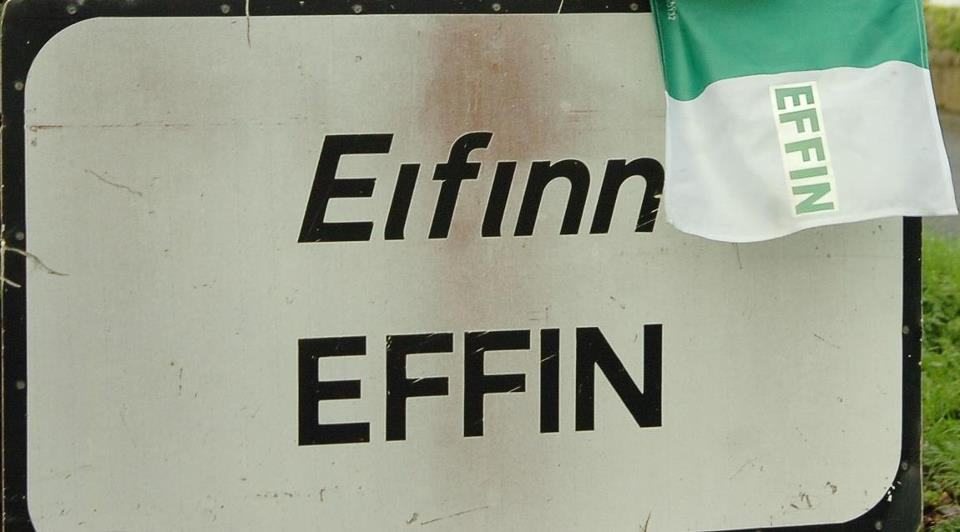
- Signage in Effin village

- Location in Ireland
- Coordinates: 52.362322°N 8.610567°W
- Country: Ireland
- Province: Munster
- County: County Limerick

Population (2006)
  - Total: 1,441
- Irish Grid Reference: R5732523937

Effin (Irish: Eimhín) is a townland and civil parish in County Limerick, Ireland. It is on the R515 road, midway between Kilmallock and Charleville. The population of the parish is about 1,000. Effin is partly in the barony of Coshlea, but chiefly in that of Coshma. The parish lies in the Golden Vale, Munster's rich dairyland, and intensive dairying is practised there. The Ballyhoura Mountains, which separate County Limerick from County Cork, are at the southern end of the parish.

== History ==
Historical population
Year	Pop.	±%
1949	1,270	—
1951	1,190	−6.3%
1956	1,111	−6.6%
1961	1,022	−8.0%
2006	1,441	+41.0%

The area is named after Saint Eimhin, (see also Monasterevin in County Kildare) pronounced /ˈɛfɪn/ EF-in. In the past, the local seats belonged to J. Balie, and R. Low Holmes. Balie lived in Newpark, and Holmes in Maidenhall.

There is a silver chalice still in use in Effin which bears the following inscription: Aegidius Hiffernane et Eleanora Gibbon et Cornelius Hiffernane Aegidii filius me fieri fecurunt 1633.

It has frequently been noted on lists of unusual place names. In November 2011, residents of Effin came into conflict with the Facebook website when they could not register the village as their home. "Effin" was deemed by Facebook to be "offensive"; the word "effing" is also a euphemism for "fucking", and was blocked. Effin residents campaigned against the block, and Facebook stated that it was investigating the matter. The following month, it was discovered that Facebook users could register Effin as their hometown.

== Places of interest ==
=== Church ===
Father David Nagle built the present church of Effin in 1835-6 and on his death in 1847, he was buried there. The church was renovated in 1981. There is a statue of the crucifixion on the right-hand side, at the entrance to the church, donated by Michael Rea.

=== Canon Hayes Hall ===
A parish hall was built in the 1950s. It was in memory of John, Canon Hayes, P.P., Founder of Muintir na Tíre, who was a native of Murroe in east County Limerick and who spent his final years as parish priest of Bansha & Kilmoyler which is in west County Tipperary and is a parish of the Diocese of Cashel and Emly. Canon Hayes was a supported of rural development, whose dictum was that the small communities of rural Ireland must help themselves in unison, regardless of class, creed or calling in life. He died on St Bridget's Day, 1 February 1957, during the building of the hall. On the 50th anniversary of the opening of the hall, a book on its history was published.

=== Graveyard ===
According to Samuel Lewis's Topographical Dictionary of Ireland (published in 1837), when Effin was united with the parish of Kilquane and Kilbreedy Minor, there were two small chapels in the parish; one at Effin, the other at Kilbreedy. Kilbreedy Minor church was badly ruined by the late 1830s. Only the middle and side walls of the choir remained.

Kilquane church was a brown sandstone church erected at the foot of Cahir Hill. By 1840, little remained of this ancient structure. Another church, Kilbigly church, had disappeared by 1840. The parish of Kilquane had its own chapel up to the 1830s when a new chapel was erected in Effin. A few years before its closure, up to 600 people were attending mass there every Sunday. It was a thatched chapel. There are no longer any remains. The last part of it standing was the sacristy and this remained up to and around 1910. The boundary wall still remains and the entrance can be seen.

=== Wells ===
Lady's Well is in the townland of Ballyshanedehy in the parish of Effin. It is located about 600 metres north of the Ballyhea-Ardpatrick road. The well, previously considered as holy well, ceased to be a place of pilgrimage by the early 1900s, but continued to provide water for local people for domestic use up to the 1940s. It is lined in local stone and was restored by the landowner on whose property it lies.

There is also a well located in the townland of Ballymacshaneboy located about a mile and a half south of the Ballyhea-Ardpatrick road at the foot of the Ballyhoura mountains. This well was known as Tobar Rí an Domhnaigh, meaning 'well of the King of Sunday'. Nine smaller wells surround this well. This well is enclosed by an earthen bank of circular form. It is believed that the well was stone-lined by a grateful father whose daughter's senses were restored after a fall from a horse, upon bathing her eyes and forehead with water from the well. A local man cleaned around the well in 1966 and erected a small shrine. The well is maintained and people still visit it.

Toberacran, a well in the townland of Gortnacrank, derived its name from Tobar a' Chrann, meaning "well of the tree". Toberacran ceased to be a pilgrimage site by 1840.

Saint Bridgit's Well in Kilbreedy townland was no longer a pattern site by 1840. It was a small clear pool, roughly lined with stones. One large stone was set on edge beside the well. It was formerly known for its alleged power to cure sickness, especially sore eyes.

Danahar mentions a well in the parish, Toberreendoney, which is the anglicised version of 'Tobar Rí an Domhnaigh'. Danaher refers to two other wells in the parish, namely Tobernea and Toberbansha, but does not describe them as holy wells.

== Townlands ==
#	English	Irish	Translation
1	Ballincolly	Baile an Chollaigh	The town of the boar
2	Ballyhaght	Baile an Chiochtaigh	The town of An Ciochtach
3	Ballymacshaneboy	Baile Mhic Sheáin Bhuí	The town of the son of Séan Buí
4	Ballyshonikin	Baile na nGall	The town of the standing stones
5	Brickfield	Baile Sheoinicín	The town of Seoinicín
6	Cloonlogue	Baile an Bhaoilligh	The town of An Baoilleach
7	Effin	Eifinn	Named after St Eimhin
8	Garranekeagh	An Garrán Caoch	The blind grove
9	Garryncoonagh North	Garraí an Chuanaigh Thuaidh	The garden of An Cuanach
10	Garryncoonagh South	Garraí an Chuanaigh Theas	The garden of An Cuanach
11	Garrynderk North	Garraí na Deirce Thuaidh	The garden of the cave
12	Garrynderk South	Garraí na Deirce Theas	The garden of the cave
13	Gortacrank	Gort an Chrainn	The field of the tree
14	Graiganster	Gráig Anstair	The hamlet of Anstar
15	Jamestown	Baile Shéamais	The town of Séamas
16	Kilbreedy West	Cill Bhríde	The church of Brid
17	Leagane	An Liagán	The standing stone
18	Mountblakeney	Cnoc an tSoipéalaigh	The hill of An Soipéalach
19	Newpark	An Pháirc Nua	
20	Thomastown	Baile Thomáis	The town of Tomás
21	Tobernea	Tobar Naí	Well of the infant
22	Tobernea East	Tobar Naí Thoir	Well of the infant
23	Tobernea West	Tobar Naí Thiar	Well of the infant

=== Garrienderk ===
Garrienderk or Garrynderk (Irish: Garraí na Deirce) is a small townland and settlement on the R515 road near Charleville and the border with County Cork. It is beside Effin townland and within Effin parish. The townland contains a church dedicated to Saint Patrick.

== Education ==
Scoil Mhuire National School is a co-educational primary school. The school opened in 1941. As of the 2016/2017 academic year, the school had a staff of four teaches and 125 students.

== Sport ==
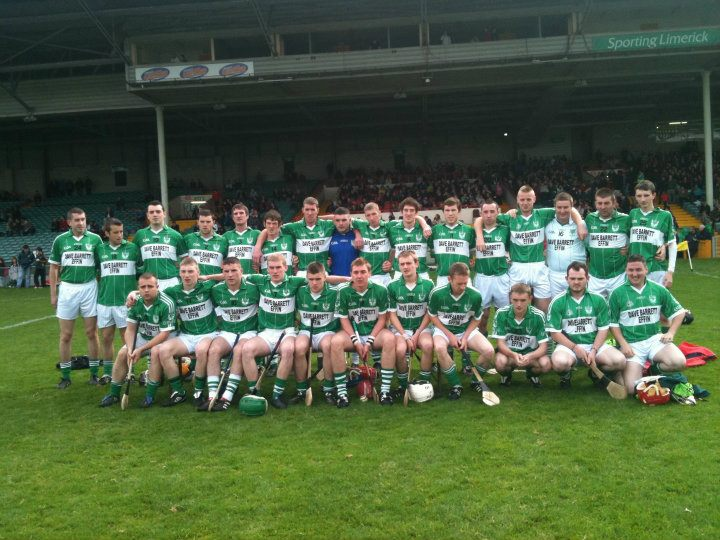
County and Munster Intermediate Champions 2011

There has been a Gaelic Athletic Association (GAA) club in existence in the parish since 1887. There is a GAA sports field with changing rooms and stand. In 2010, Effin's hurling team won their first ever county-final, and went on to win a Munster title. However, they were defeated in the All-Ireland semi final by Na Fianna. In 2011, they won the Intermediate Hurling County Championship and the Munster Title. Competing as a Senior hurling team for a couple of years, as of 2023 the club play in the Limerick Premier Intermediate Hurling Championship. In 2012, the club celebrated 125 years in existence. A number of Effin hurlers have played for inter-county teams, including Nicky Quaid, Ned Rea, Conor O'Donovan and Tommy Quaid.

== People ==
- Tim Hannan, using the pseudonym "Rambling Thady", wrote a column for the Limerick Leader newspaper from 1933 until his death in 1948. He was a contributor to the Limerick Leader with his column, "Stray Scraps" from 1933 until his death in 1948, and a local school master, councillor, and public figure.
- John C. O'Riordan, a Catholic bishop of Kenema in Sierra Leone, was born here.
- Brother Stephen Russell, born in 1911 in Thomastown, Effin, was veteran of World War II and a poet. After the war, he founded the Alexian Order. He died in 1975 and is buried in County Down. In November 2013, the sod was turned on the redevelopment of Brother Russell House.

== See also ==
- List of towns and villages in Ireland
