= Corbmac =

6th-century Irish saint

Saint Corbmac
- Born: Ireland
- Venerated in: Catholic Church
- Feast: 21 June

Saint Corbmac (fl. c. 6th-century), also known as Cormac mac Eogain, was an Irish saint.

== Life ==
Corbmac was the son of Eogan, and descended in the ninth generation from Olioll Olum, King of Munster (died 234). He had five brothers, all of whom "laboured for Christ" in different provinces of Ireland, and "to each the piety of after times assigned heavenly honours." One of them, Saint Eimhin, is the reputed author of the Tripartite Life of Saint Patrick.

Corbmac, desirous of pursuing a religious life, set out from his birthplace in Munster for the north of Ireland, in search of a solitary place. Arriving in Connacht, he first visited the court of Eógan Bél, who lived in the fortress of Dun Eogain, situated on an island in Lough Measg. The remains of this fortress were visible when John O'Donovan visited the island in 1838. Not being well received by the King, Corbmac left the island, announcing as a prophet of God that "it was preordained" that the palace should become a monastery.

Crossing the River Robe on his journey northward, he arrived at Fort Lothair, in the territory of Ceara (Carra, County Mayo). Here he was hospitably received by Olioll Inbanda and Aedh Flaithemda, sons of Cellach, and twelve chieftains, but when about to settle among them he was opposed by Saint Finan, who had built an oratory there, and was afraid that "the boundaries of his church would be narrowed if another set up near him." This Finan was abbot of Teampull Ratha, a church the ruins of which are still to be seen in the parish of Raymochy, County Donegal. In consequence of this opposition he pursued his journey, and arrived at the dwelling of a virgin named Daria, daughter of Catheir, son of Lugaidh, a prince in that territory. She was also known as So-deilbh (Old Irish: "of beautiful form"), and according to Colgan was venerated on 26 October. In consequence of her kindness he promised her an abundance of cattle; hence the plain was known as the "plain of the heifers", now Moygawnagh, in Tirawley.

Travelling still northwards, he reached the estuary of the River Moy, where the sixteen sons of Amalgaid were assembled in convention. Saint Emhin in the Tripartite reckons only twelve; but the statement of Colgan, taken from the Book of Lecan, is in some degree supported by the Tribes and Customs of Hy Fiachrach, which states them as fifteen. Amalgaid had two wives, Tressan, daughter of Nadfraoich, King of Munster, and Erc, daughter of Eochaidh, King of Leinster. The sons of the former were favourable to Corbmac when he presented himself at the assembly, and requested permission to settle there, but the sons of Erc opposed him. In the end, however, he was permitted to choose a place to dwell in, and he accordingly selected a favourable spot at the estuary of the Moy. The fishery, according to the Bardic accounts, had been famous from the remotest times, and in later ages had been visited and blessed by Saint Patrick, Saint Brigid, and others. The establishment founded here was enriched by grants of lands and tithes. Among other gifts bestowed on it were the lands of Cill-roe and Cill-aladh, held formerly by Bishop Muiredach and the sons of Droigin. Besides the sons of Amalgaid other chieftains became his supporters, as for instance Eochaidh Breac, whose posterity, the Hy Eachach of Hy Fiachrach Aidne, were devoted to him. In the lapse of time their devotion grew cold, and Corbmac was superseded by later saints, among whom were Saint Cumain Fota, a descendant of Erc, and Saint Deirbile, also a native saint.

When his establishment was placed on a secure foundation, he turned his thoughts to the neighbouring territory of Luigni (Legney, County Sligo), over which and the adjacent territory of Gaileanga (Gallen, County Mayo) Diermid, son of Finbarr, then ruled, who was of the race of Cian, son of Olioll Olum, and therefore of his kindred. This prince received him kindly, and bound his seven successors to pay three cows annually to Corbmac and those who should come after him; but Aidan, son of Colman, who had a monastery near, fearing lest the interests of his church should suffer, remonstrated with him, and advised that he as a stranger should return to his own country, and seek for lands there. King Diermid tried to make peace, but Corbmac determined to return to his friends, the sons of Amalgaid, and devoted himself to the office of peacemaker, endeavouring to establish good feeling between them and the race of Cian. For this purpose he induced them to hold a meeting at a hill called Tulach Chapaich ("the hill of friendship"), at which were present with him Saint Froech of Cluain Colluing and Saint Athracht of Killaraght. Here a perpetual league of friendship was formed. This was afterwards renewed, and three celebrated conventions were held there.

"So devoted was Corbmac and so holy his manner of life that gifts were bestowed on him continually, and he was treated as their tutelar divinity." Once more, however, intrigues were set on foot against him as a stranger and intruder, and three messengers in succession were sent to order him to leave the district. The first of these having been cursed by the saint was devoured by wolves on the mountain of Sliabh botha, near Ros Airgid, where a cairn marks the spot. The other two messengers having deprecated the saint's wrath escaped with their lives. This incident was evidently suggested by the story of Elijah in 2 Kings 1.

Corbmac is credited with having cured a youth who suffered from a "deadly, contagious disease caused by a pestilential exhalation" from the mountain Sith badha, near Rathcroghan, County Roscommon, believed to be haunted by demons. To him is also ascribed a bath, called Dabhach Corbmaic, in which whoever bathed should not die a violent death, and, if a maiden, should have a happy marriage.

== Dates ==
Such are the facts recorded in the Book of Lecan. The question, however, of the date at which he flourished is one of peculiar difficulty, owing to the anachronisms which abound in it. Colgan thought he flourished in the fifth century, and Lanigan considered that some indications pointed to the seventh; but there are grounds for thinking that his true date is the sixth century; for as he was ninth in descent from Olioll Olum (died AD 234), allowing thirty years for each generation, we have 270 + 234, which gives AD 504. Again, his brother Saint Emhin, according to Ussher, flourished in 580, and most of the events of his history, as his visit to King Eogan Bel (died 547) and Olioll Inbanda (died 544), fall within the sixth century. There is, it is true, a difficulty in the case of Saint Becan, who is reckoned among his brothers, as the Four Masters give his death at 688; but Geoffrey Keating (Reign of Diarmuid Mac Fergusa) says some authorities held that besides Fiacha Muillethan, Eogan Mor had another son Diarmuid, from whom Becan was descended. He would thus be a near relative, not a brother of Corbmac, and the period of his death does not affect the calculation. Colgan suggests that the anachronisms are due to interpolations, and perhaps also what is said of the sons of Amalgaid may be referred to the tribes descended from them, and thus belonging to a later period than the narrative would lead one to expect. Colgan gives his life at 26 March, but is uncertain whether that or 13 December is the right date. At the latter the Corbmac mentioned in the Martyrology of Donegal seems to be our saint, and is called Cruimther (i.e. presbyter) Corbmac.

== Sources ==
- Great Book of Lecan, Royal Irish Academy, fol. 60;
- Colgan's Acta Sanctorum Hiberniae, p. 751;
- Martyrology of Donegal, O'Currey's MS. Materials, p. 351;
- Tribes and Customs of Hy Fiachrach, p. 7;
- Lanigan's Ecclesiastical History of Ireland. ii. 215;
- Keating's History of Ireland, "Reign of Diarmuid Mac Fergusa";
- Annals of the Four Masters, AD 544.

== Bibliography ==
- Olden, Thomas (1887). "Corbmac" . In Stephen, Leslie (ed.). Dictionary of National Biography. Vol. 12. London: Smith, Elder & Co. pp. 209–211.
