= Nos attendentes =

Nos attendentes is the incipit designating a Papal bull apparently issued in January 1217 by Pope Honorius III. Its genuineness has been suspected. If genuine, it is the second of the two bulls that established the Dominican Order (for the first, see Religiosam vitam). In it, the Pope describes the brothers of the order as pugiles fidei et vera mundi lumina: "fighters for the faith and true lights of the world".

The original bull was kept at the convent of Prouille, Saint Dominic's first foundation, and it was from this source that the Latin text was published in 1504 by Albert de Castillo. Later editions derive from this one. The documents of the convent were scattered during the French Revolution; the original was then lost. The convent's cartulary containing a 17th-century transcript was recovered, but was not shown to enquirers.

== Bibliography ==
- Albert de Castillo, Privilegia maiora et principaliora. Venice: apud Lazarum de Soardis, 1504.
- M. Bihl in Archivum Franciscanum historicum vol. 27 (1934) pp. 262-263.
- Pierre Mandonnet, M.-H. Vicaire, Saint Dominique: l'idée, l'homme et l'oeuvre (Paris: Desclée de Brouwer, 1938) vol. 1 p. 55 note 50.
