= Brother Stephen Russell =

Brother Stephen Russell (born Jim Russell, 25 December 1911, Thomastown, Kilmallock, County Limerick, Ireland – 11 May 1975) was a poet, comedian, Alexian Brother, Good Samaritan and carer of down and outs. Brother Russell House in Limerick is named after him in honour of his work with helping Limerick's homeless in the 1970s.

== Early years ==
Russell was educated at the Christian Brothers School in Charleville to which he either walked of travelled in a donkey buggy (with six or seven others) each day, a distance of three and a half miles each way.

== Military career ==
He joined the Irish army at the start of World War 2 in 1939 and served in the First cycle squadron being stationed in Collins Barracks in Cork, Fermoy, Foynes, Listowel and Sarsfield Barracks, Limerick. He was well known and popular as a comedian in the southern command entertainment group. At the end of the emergency he was discharged from the Army in 1943.

== Religious years ==
In 1945 he joined the congregation of the Alexian Brothers in Warrenpoint Co Down in September 1945. He received the habit on the feast of St Alexius 17 July 1948. Transferred to the Novitiate of the Alexian Order in Cobh, Co. Cork in 1948 he helped establishment of the foundation of the Novitiate House there. He then was transferred to the Alexian Monastery in Moston cemetery in (the United Kingdom where he spent the next three years burying the dead. He was transferred to the Alexian Monastery, Henri Chappelle in Belgium in 1954 where he severed on the nursing staff for three years. It was there he served on the nursing staff for three years. It was in Belgium that he started writing poetry and sent it regularly to the Limerick Leader and later to the Limerick Weekly Echo.

In 1961 he returned to Ireland as vocational Promoter of the Alexian Brothers and spent four years travelling all over Ireland, visiting schools and seeking out postulants for the order. In 1965 he transferred back to Manchester where he served on the Nursing Staff of St. Mary's Alexian Nursing Home for Geriatric male patients. In 1968 Brother Stephen was attached to the Morning Star hostel for homeless men, which is under the auspices of the legion of Mary in Manchester. It was here he worked for the homeless and destitute and in 1973 volunteered with Bro. Anthony Ferrie to fulfil the request by the then Dr. Murphy, Bishop of Limerick, to help in the continuity of staffing the Simon Community Hostel at Charlotte Quay Limerick which had been established some three to four years previously. He finally returned to Ireland with Brother Anthony Ferrie to take over the management and supervision of the Simon Community hostel at Charlotte Quay limerick which had been established some three to four years previously. Unknown to most of his friends and colleagues Brother Stephen's health had been deteriorating for some years and he died on 11 May 1975.

== Poetry ==
His first book of poems, There but for the Grace of God, was published in 1972 and Brother Russell donated the entire proceeds of its sale to the Simon Community Building fund. Poems and Parodies of Brother Stephen was published in 1974 by Oriel Press

== Brother Russell House ==
He did not live to see the realisation of his dream; namely, the provision of a suitable and creditable Simon Centre for Limerick City. To the credit of his many friends and the sympathetic Officers of the Mid-Western Board, such a centre was eventually constructed and fittingly was named after him, known as The Brother Stephen Russell Home in Limerick. It bears his oft timed quote: "There but for the grace of God go I."

He is buried with his fellow Brothers in Christ in the cemetery attached to Alexian Brothers in Warrenpoint, County Down.

On 29 November 2013, the sod was turned on the redevelopment of Brother Russell House. The old building was no longer fit for purpose and did not match the basic needs for dignity and privacy. In less than one year the new facility opened and capacity at the house increased from 26 to 33 beds. Each of the men have their own ensuite room and now have a home of their own for life. This new development was made possible through funding from the Department of Environment, Community and Local Government and the generosity of the JP McManus Benevolent Fund.
