= Eimhin Kelly =

Irish hurler

Personal information
- Native name: Eimhin Ó Ceallaigh (Irish)
- Born: 1998 (age 27–28) Lusmagh, County Offaly, Ireland

Sport
- Sport: Hurling
- Position: Midfield
Club
- Years: Club
- Lusmagh
Club titles
- Offaly titles: 0
College
- Years: College
- Mary Immaculate College
College titles
- Fitzgibbon titles: 0
Inter-county
- Years: County
- 2021-present: Offaly
Inter-county titles
- Leinster titles: 0
- All-Irelands: 0
- NHL: 0
- All Stars: 0

Eimhin Kelly (born 1998) is an Irish hurler. At club level he plays with Lusmagh and at inter-county level with the Offaly senior hurling team.

== Career ==
Kelly first played hurling to a high standard in various Leinster competitions as a student at Banagher College in Banagher. After progressing through the juvenile and underage ranks with the Lusmagh club, he eventually made his debut at adult level.

Kelly first appeared on the inter-county scene during an unsuccessful two-year tenure with the Offaly minor hurling team in 2015 and 2016. He later spent one season with the under-21 team.

Kelly made his senior team debut during the 2021 National Hurling League. He secured his first silverware in his debut season, when Offaly claimed the National League Division 2A and Christy Ring Cup titles. Kelly won a Joe McDonagh Cup medal in 2024 after a defeat of Laois in the final.

== Personal life ==
His father, Brendan Kelly, was an All-Ireland SHC-winner with Offaly in 1994.

== Honours ==
Offaly

- Joe McDonagh Cup: 2024
- Christy Ring Cup: 2021
- National League Division 2A: 2021, 2023
