= Lasse Bengtsson =

Swedish journalist

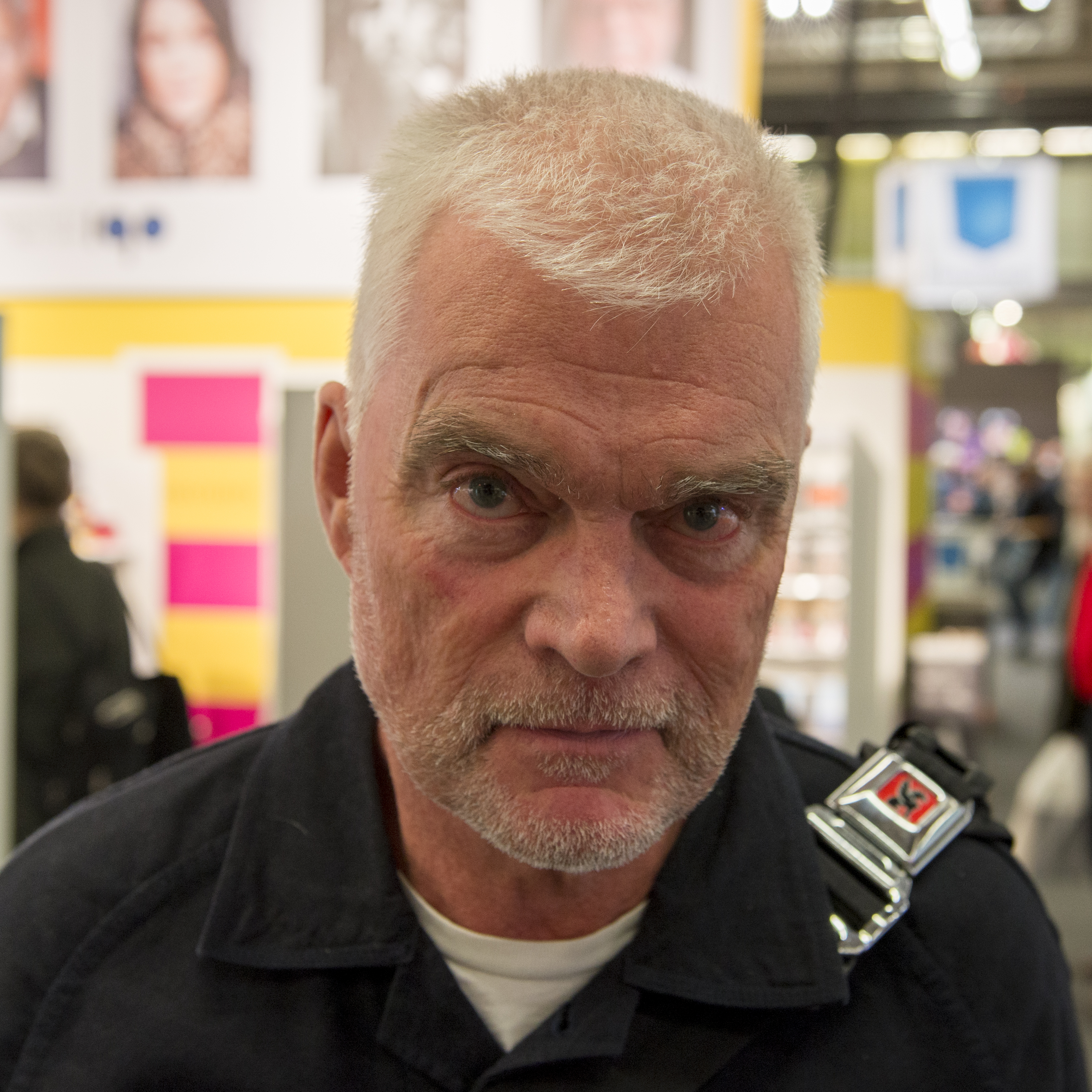
Bengtsson in 2013

Lars Olov "Lasse" Bengtsson (born 22 December 1951) is a Swedish journalist and television presenter. He has been the presenter of shows such as Nyhetsmorgon Lördag, TV4-nyheterna, Misstänkt, and he also was a reporter for the Swedish broadcasts of the 2016 Summer Olympics in Rio de Janeiro.

== Career ==
Bengtsson has worked for Sveriges Radio, TV4 and Viasat. His first journalist work was for a local radio station in Malmfältet during the miners strike there. After that he worked for Sveriges Radio; among the shows he appeared on was Dagens Eko, and he was also a foreign correspondent, news-presenter, reporter and producer for the same show. In 1991 he started working for TV4 when he presented the news morning show Nyhetsmorgon Lördag, and TV4-nyheterna. One of his first jobs for TV4 was travelling to Bosnia to report on the Bosnian war and the refugees there. He also conducted the first televised interview with Mattias Flink in March 2009, about fifteen years after Flink committed mass murder.

Bengtsson became the presenter of the show Misstänkt which had its premiere on 2 April 2009. The show was a crime show with a journalist angle. Bengtsson left TV4 on 1 September 2010 and started working as the information coordinator for the Swedish Afghanistan committee in Kabul. In August 2014 he returned to Sveriges Radio where he presented P4 Extra, substituting for Lotta Bromé at times. In his first show on P4 Extra he interviewed the skier Charlotte Kalla.

In 2016, he was a reporter for Viasat's broadcasting of the 2016 Summer Olympics in Rio de Janeiro. He made a report from a favela called Cidade de Deus.
