= Religiosam vitam =

1216 papal bull regarding the Dominican Order

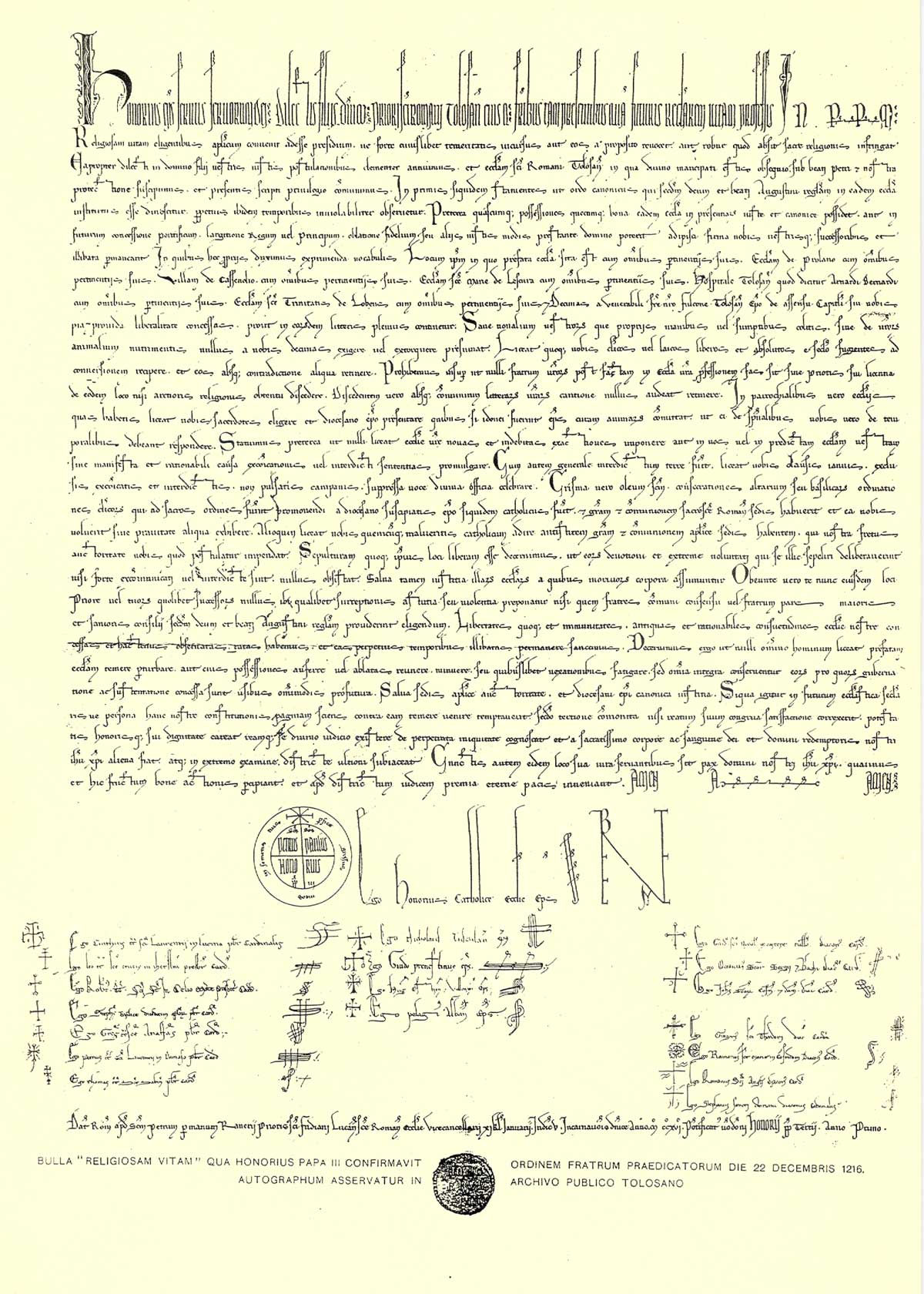
Religiosam vitam

Religiosam vitam is the incipit designating a papal bull issued on 22 December 1216 by Pope Honorius III. It gave universal recognition to the Dominican Order. The order already had monasteries in Rome, Paris and Boulogne and had already been locally recognized by the bishop of Toulouse the year before – its creation had coincided with the Albigensian Crusade in southern France, in whose support the Dominicans had been very active. It adopted the Rule of St Augustine, but was also regulated by rulings and decisions taken by its own regular general chapters.

== Text in English ==
Honorius, bishop, servant of the servants of God, to the beloved sons Dominic, prior of St. Romanus in Toulouse, and his brethren, both present and future, professed in the regular life. In perpetuum.

It is fitting that apostolic protection should be extended to those choosing the religious life, lest temerarious attacks should possibly turn them away from their purpose or, God forbid, destroy the vigour of the sacred religious institute. Wherefore, beloved sons in the Lord, we benevolently assent to your just requests. We take the Church of St. Romanus in Toulouse, where you have given yourselves to the service of God, under the protection of St. Peter and our own, and we secure it with the present written privilege.

In the first place, indeed, we decree that the canonical Order which is known to be established according to God and the Rule of St. Augustine in the said Church should be inviolably preserved forever.

Moreover, that whatever possessions and whatever goods the said church at present justly and canonically possesses or shall be able, the Lord granting, to acquire in the future through the concession of the popes, the liberality of kings or princes, the offerings of the faithful, or other just means, should belong firmly and inviolably to you and your successors. Among these goods, we have deemed it well to name the following: the place itself where the said church is situated, with its properties; the church of Prouille with its properties; the estate of Caussanel with its properties; the church of St. Mary of Lescure with its properties; the hospice in Toulouse, called “the Hospice of Arnold Bernard,” with its properties; the church of the Holy Trinity in Loubens, with its properties; and the tithes which, in his good and provident liberality, our venerable brother Foulques, the bishop of Toulouse, with the consent of his chapter, has given you, as this is more explicitly contained in his letters.

Also let no one presume to exact or extort from you tithes from the fruits of the lands which you cultivate with your own hands or at your own expense, or from the produce of your animals.

Moreover, you may receive and keep, without opposition from anyone, members of the clergy or the laity who are free men and unencumbered by debt, who flee from the world to enter the religious life.

Furthermore, we prohibit any of your brethren, after they have made profession in your church to depart from it without the permission of their prior, except for the purpose of entering a stricter religious institute. If one should leave, let no one dare to receive him without the authorization of a letter from your community.

In the parochial churches which you hold, you may select priests and present them to the bishop of the diocese, to whom, if they are worthy, the bishop shall entrust the care of souls, so that they may be responsible to him in spiritual matters and to you in temporal matters.

We decree further that no one may impose new and unjust exactions on your church, or promulgate sentences of excommunication or interdict on you or your church without a manifest and just cause. When, however, a general interdict shall be laid on the whole territory, it will be permitted to you to celebrate the divine office behind closed doors, chanting in a low voice, not ringing the bells, and excluding those under excommunication and interdict.

The sacred Chrism, holy oils, the consecration of altars or basilicas, and the ordination of clerics who are to be promoted to holy orders, you shall obtain from the bishop of the diocese, so long as he is a Catholic and in grace and communion with the most holy Roman See and is willing to impart these to you without any irregularity. Otherwise, you may approach any Catholic bishop you may choose, provided he be in grace and communion with the Apostolic See; and armed with our authority, he may impart to you what you petition.

Moreover, we grant this place freedom of burial. Let no one, then, place an obstacle to the devotion and last will of those who choose to be buried there, provided they are not excommunicated or under interdict. However, the just rights of the churches from which the corpses are taken must be safeguarded.

When you, who are now the Prior of this place, or any of your successors shall go out of office, no one shall be appointed by secret craftiness or violence; but only he whom the brethren, by common agreement, or whom those brethren who are of more mature and sound judgment shall choose to elect according to God and the Rule of St. Augustine.

Furthermore, the liberties, ancient immunities, and reasonable customs granted to your church and observed up to this time, we ratify and command that they shall endure inviolably for all future time. We decree, therefore, that no one may rashly disturb the aforementioned church, take away its possessions or, having removed, keep them, diminish them, or harass them by any kind of molestation, but all these goods shall be preserved intact entirely for the control, sustenance, and use of those for whom they have been granted, saving the authority of the Apostolic See and the canonical rights of the diocesan bishop.

If, therefore, in the future any ecclesiastical or secular person whosoever, having knowledge of this our document, shall rashly attempt to contravene it, and if, after a second or third admonition, he refuses to correct his fault by fitting satisfaction, let him forfeit the dignity of his power and honor; and let him know that he shall stand guilty of the perpetrated evil before God’s judgment and shall be denied the most sacred Body and Blood of our God and Lord, our Saviour Jesus Christ, and shall, at the last judgment, be delivered to strict vengeance. Nevertheless, may all those who uphold the rights of the said place have the peace of Our Lord Jesus Christ, receive the fruit of good action here on earth, and, before the Just Judge, receive the rewards of eternal peace. Amen, amen, amen.

I, Honorius, Bishop of the Catholic Church.

Perfect my steps in your ways. Fare ye well!

[Then follow the signatures of eighteen cardinals.]

Given at Rome at St. Peter, by the hand of Ranerio, Prior of Santo Fridiano in Lucca, Vice-Chancellor of the holy Roman Church, on the eleventh of the kalends of January, the fifth indiction, the 1216th year of Our Lord’s Incarnation, the first year of the Lord Pope, Honorius III.

== See also ==
- Nos attendentes
