= Willibald Imhoff =

German art collector

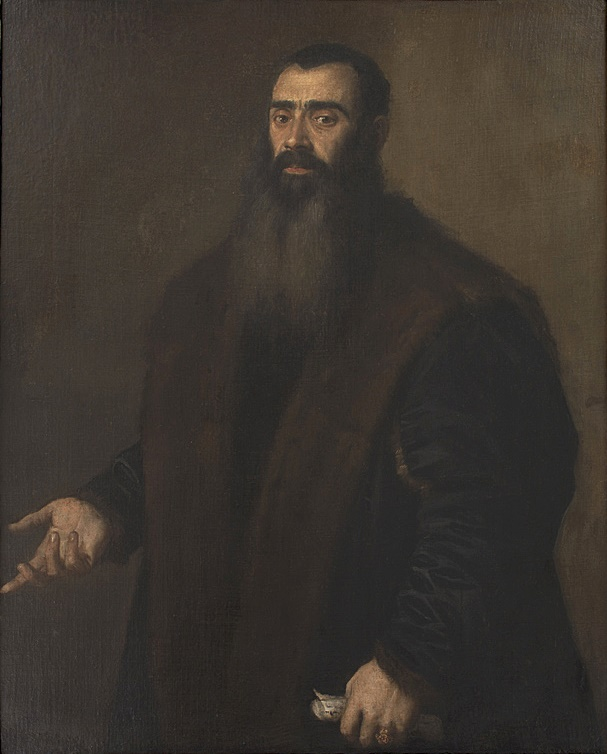
- Portrait of Willibald Imhoff (Titian)
- Born: 16 November 1519; Nuremberg, Germany
- Died: January 25, 1580 (aged 60); Patrizier, Germany
- Occupation: Art collector
- Relatives: Willibald Pirckheimer (grandfather)

Willibald Imhoff (born 16 November 1519 in Nuremberg, Holy Roman Empire, died 25 January 1580) was an art collector of the famous Nuremberg Imhoff family, and the grandson of Willibald Pirckheimer. He was a wealthy partner in the Imhoff trading company. In his youth, Imhoff stayed in his family's trading offices in Lyon and Antwerp to learn wholesale and long-distance trade. In 1540-42 he traveled to France and then in 1544 to Spain. In 1545 he married Anna Harsdörffer (1528-1601), daughter of Wolff Harsdörffer and Ehrentraud Welser. Even after that he regularly made trips to Lyon and Zaragoza as a partner of the trading company.

Since Willibald Pirckheimer died in 1530 without descendants in the male line, his library and a large part of his art possession passed to Willibald Imhoff. The art collection was successively expanded by Imhoff as the Imhoff art cabinet and included among other works by his grandfather's close friend Albrecht Dürer (including his Portrait of Johann Kleberger) works by Holbein, Cranach, Titian and Paris Bordone. He bought a large number of ancient and contemporary statues and busts made of marble or clay, a rich copperplate collection, numerous drawings by famous masters, faience, Venetian glasses, and expanded the Pirckheimer library. After the death of Andreas Dürer (Albrecht's brother) Imhoff was able to acquire numerous works by Albrecht Dürer.

Imhoff also collected coins and he cataloged the coin collection of Duke Albert V of Bavaria.

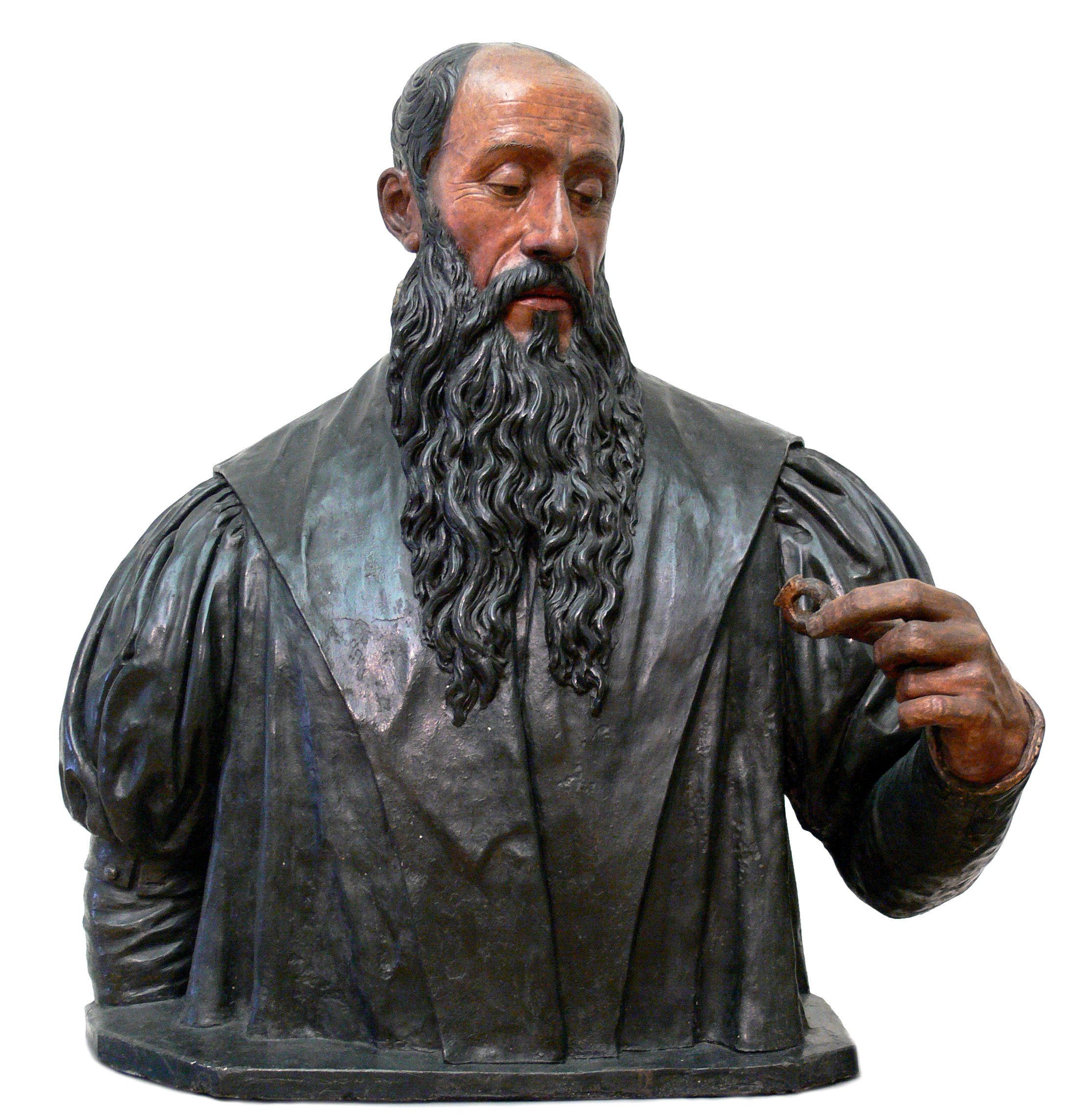
Bust of Willibald Imhoff, by Johan Gregor van der Schardt, 1570

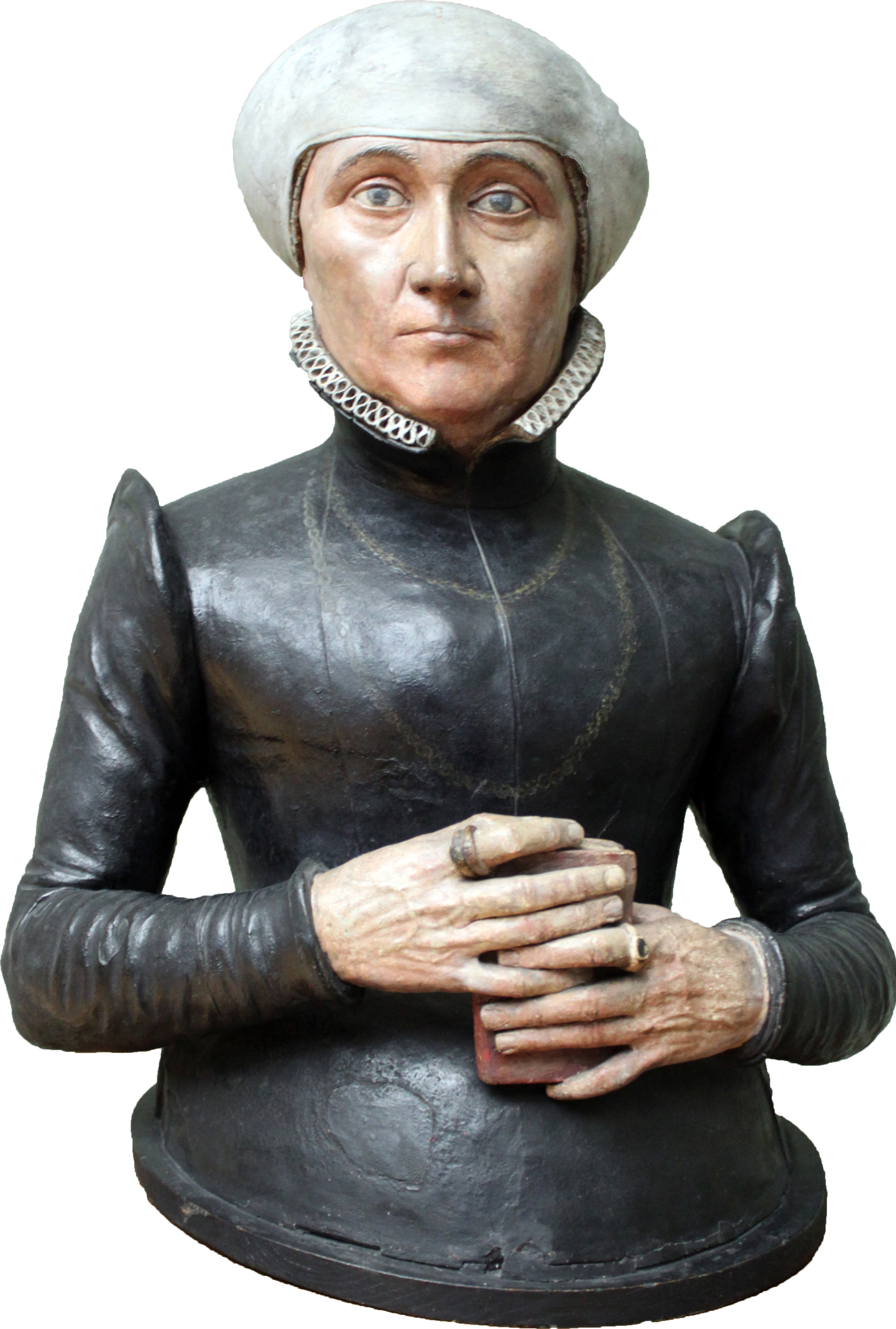
Bust of Anna Imhoff
