= Leon Coates =

English composer (1937–2023)

Leon Coates (1937–2023) was an English composer, pianist and conductor who worked mostly in Scotland.

He was born in Wolverhampton and grew up in Nottingham and Derby. Coates studied composition at St John's College, Cambridge under John Exton. He was organist of St Andrew's and St George's Church, Edinburgh.

Much of his work is chamber music and songs (many written for his wife Heather) but also includes concertos for viola and harpsichord. From 1965 to 2002, he was a highly respected member of the Music Faculty at Edinburgh University.
