= Eimhin =

Irish abbot and bishop

Eimhin /ˈɛvɪn/ was the abbot and bishop of Ros-mic-Truin (Ireland), probably in the sixth century.

Eimhin came from Munster, and was the son of Eoghan, and brother of three other saints, Corbmac, Culain, and Diarmuid. Of the early part of his religious life little is known.

The Abbey of Ros-mic-Truin was founded by St. Abban of Magheranoidhe, who entrusted it to Eimhin, and from the number of religious and students belonging to the south of Ireland who dwelt there the place came to be called "Ros-glas of the Munstermen". St Eimhin is said by some to have been the author of the life of St Patrick, called the Vita Tripartita originally published by the Franciscan John Colgan.

Eimhin was famous for many and great miracles. The date of Eimhin's death has not been recorded; however, competent authorities assign it to the earlier half of the sixth century.

Eimhin secured special status for the Monasterevin area placing it outside the common law, making it a sanctuary. After Eimhin's death, it is said, his consecrated bell was held in great veneration, and was used as a swearing relic down to the fourteenth century, oaths and promises made upon it being deemed inviolable.

The feast-day of Saint Eimhin is observed in the Irish calendars on 22 December.

The town of Monasterevin in County Kildare and the village of Effin in County Limerick are named after Eimhin. St. Evin's School is a Catholic Primary School in Monasterevin, County Kildare.
