= Willibald Pirckheimer =

German Renaissance lawyer, author and Renaissance humanist

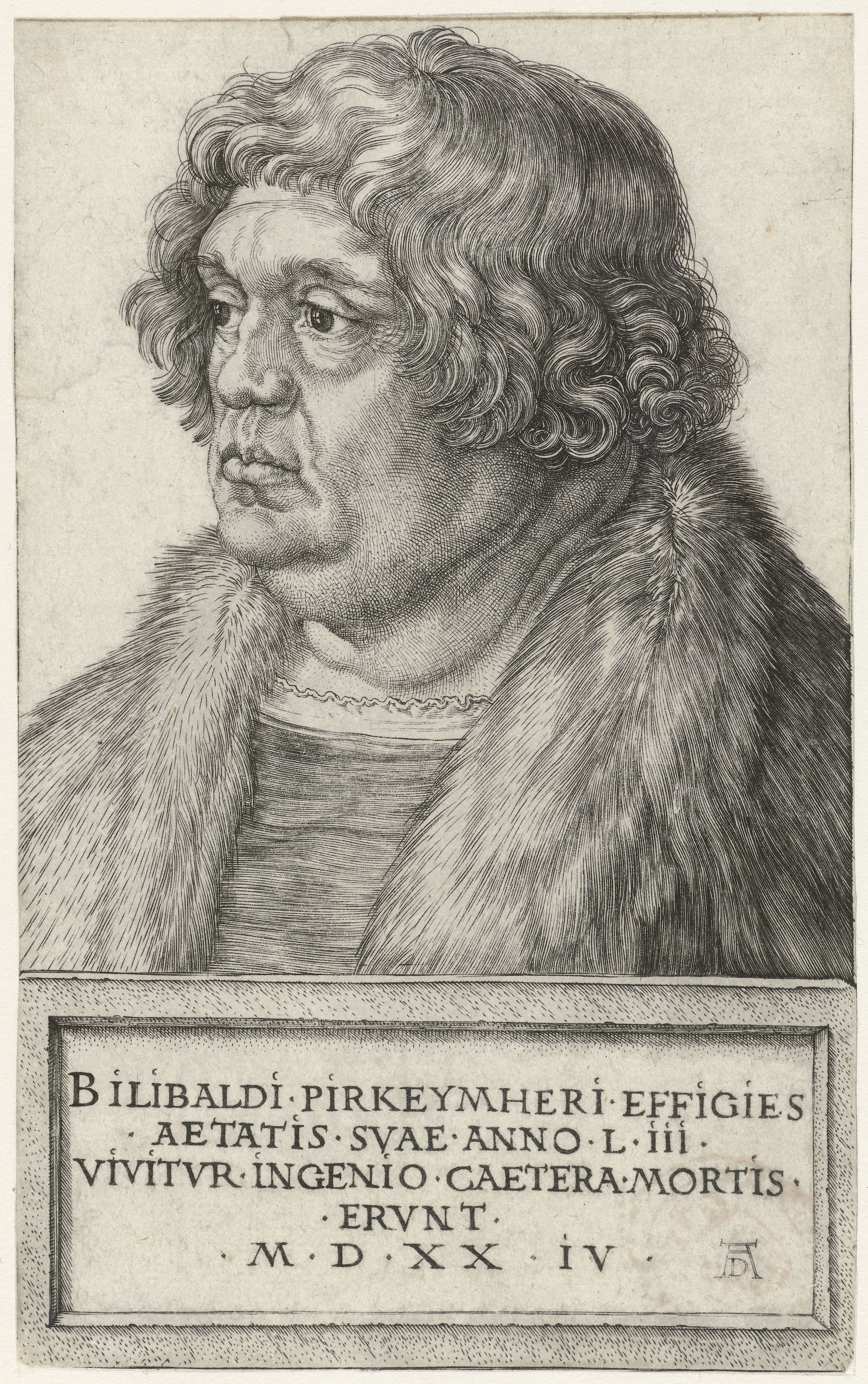
- Engraving of Willibald Pirckheimer at 53 by Albrecht Dürer, 1524. We live by the spirit. The rest belongs to death.
- Born: 5 December 1470; Eichstätt, Bishopric of Eichstätt
- Died: 22 December 1530 (aged 60); Nuremberg
- Occupation: Lawyer
- Relatives: Willibald Imhoff (grandson)

Willibald Pirckheimer (5 December 1470 – 22 December 1530) was a German Renaissance lawyer, author and Renaissance humanist, a wealthy and prominent figure in Nuremberg in the 16th century, imperial counsellor and a member of the governing City Council for two periods. One of the most important cultural patrons of Germany in his own right, he was the closest friend of the artist Albrecht Dürer, who made a number of portraits of him, and a close friend of the great humanist and theologian Erasmus.

== Biography ==
Born in Eichstätt, in the Bishopric of Eichstätt, the son of a lawyer, Dr. Johannes Pirckheimer, he was educated in Italy, studying law at Padua and Pavia for seven years. His wife was called Cresencia, and they had at least a daughter, Felicitas. His elder sister Caritas (1467–1532) was Abbess of St Clare's Franciscan convent in Nuremberg (also in effect a girls' school for the city's upper class) and was also a gifted classical scholar; Dürer's life of the Virgin woodcut series was dedicated to her. He probably met Dürer in 1495.

He was a member of a group of Nuremberg humanists including Conrad Celtis, Sebald Schreyer, and Hartmann Schedel (author of the Nuremberg Chronicle). He also was consulted by the Holy Roman Emperor Maximilian I on literary matters. He translated many classical texts into German (as well as Greek texts into Latin), and was a believer in translating "by the sense" rather than over-literally, a great question of the day. Among other works, he edited and had published an edition of Ptolemy's Geographia in 1525.

In 1499 Pirckheimer was chosen by the City Council to command their contingent of troops in the Imperial army during the Swabian War against the Swiss. On his return he was presented with a gold cup by the City. This may be referred to in Dürer's engraving Nemesis of about 1502.

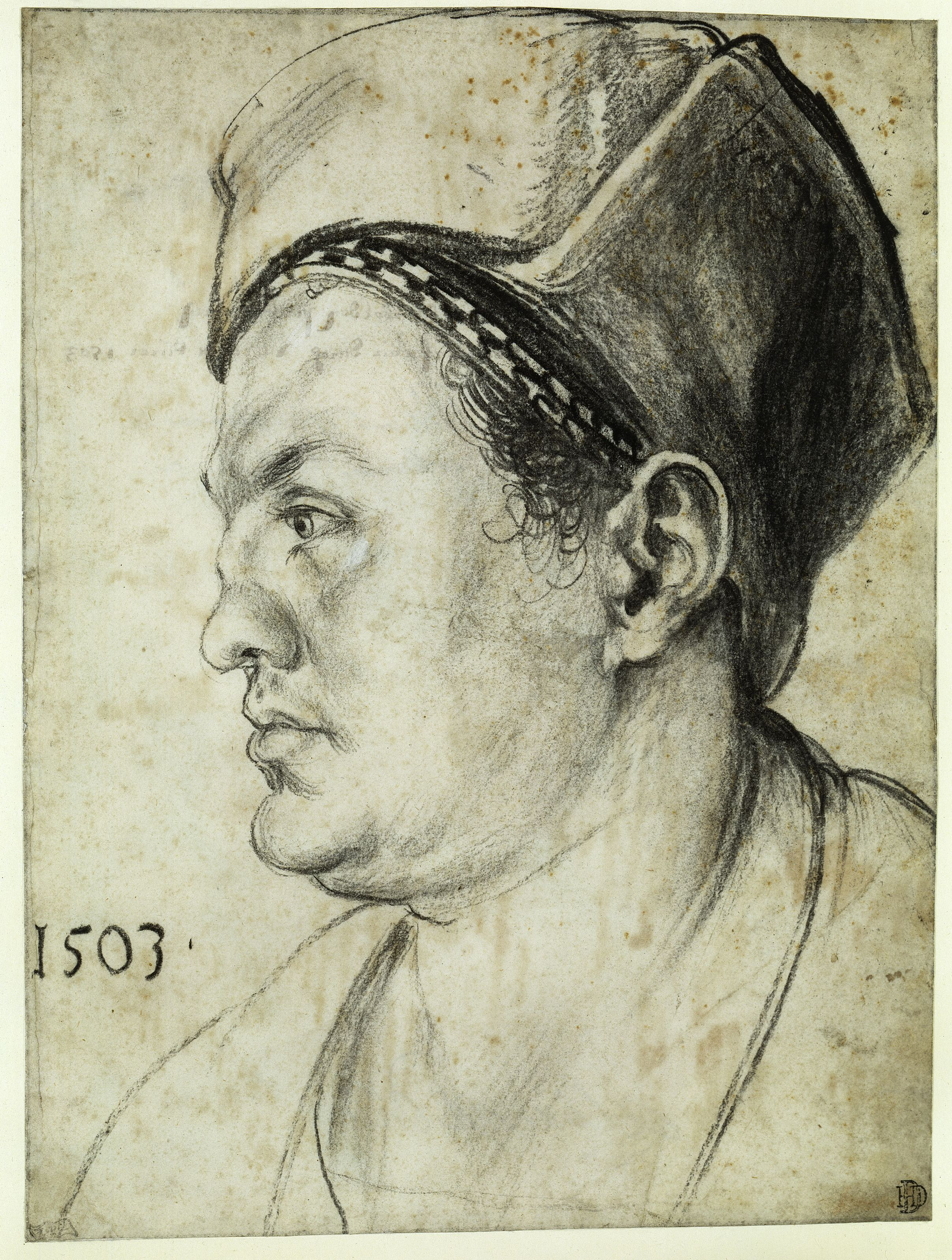
Willibald Pirckheimer by Dürer, 1503, charcoal drawing, Kupferstichkabinett Berlin

As Dürer had not received a classical education, it is usually assumed that much of the display of classical and humanist learning in his works, especially his prints, reflected his discussions with Pirckheimer. A notable example is Melencolia I. Pirckheimer lent Dürer the money for his second trip to Italy in 1506/07, and ten letters to him from Dürer in Italy demonstrate the closeness of the friendship, with much teasing.

After the death in 1560 of the last of Dürer's immediate family, Pirckheimer's grandson Willibald Imhoff bought the remaining Dürer collections and papers. Most of Pirckheimer's own library, famous in its day, was sold by another Imhoff descendant to the Earl of Arundel in 1636. Most of the Arundel library was given to the Royal Society in 1678. Some of Pirckheimer's books therefore remain there (85 have been identified), but many more were sold out of the Royal Society, firstly to Bernard Quaritch in 1873, and secondly via Sotheby's in 1925.

Pirckheimer was also a patron of the astronomer and meteorologist Johannes Werner. Werner relied on the support from Pirckheimer, Sebald Schreyer and others to develop his instruments and make systematic experiments and observances in measuring distances and locations, study the earth's magnetism and meteorology.

Pirckheimer died in Nuremberg, aged 60. Like Dürer, he is buried in the Johannisfriedhof cemetery in Nuremberg.

A portrait of Pirckheimer appears on the 100 Billion Mark note issued during Germany's Weimar Republic.

== Sources ==
- Bartrum, Giulia (2002). Albrecht Dürer and his Legacy. British Museum Press. ISBN 0-7141-2633-0.
