= List of Swedish journalists =

This is a list of Swedish journalists.

== A ==
- Amun Abdullahi (23 October 1974 – )
- Kjell Albin Abrahamson (23 June 1945 – 22 September 2016)
- Maria Abrahamsson (21 July 1963 – )
- Martin Adler (30 October 1958 – 23 June 2006)
- Sophie Adlersparre (6 July 1823 – 27 June 1895)
- Ingela Agardh (27 October 1948 – 17 June 2008)
- Catharina Ahlgren (1734 – c. 1800)
- Kattis Ahlström (9 June 1966 – )
- Lisbeth Åkerman (6 May 1967 – )
- Tom Alandh (13 June 1944 – )
- Jarl Alfredius (3 January 1943 – 31 March 2009)
- Karin Alfredsson (1953 – )
- Casten Almqvist (17 March 1962 – )
- Barbro Alving (12 January 1909 – 22 January 1987)
- Eva Andén (1886–1970)
- Leif Anderson (11 February 1925 – 17 November 1999)
- Pamela Andersson (13 March 1965 – )
- Britt Arenander (30 September 1941 – 15 July 2022)
- Anna Olsdotter Arnmar (22 June 1963 – )
- Elisabeth Åsbrink (29 April 1965 – )
- Tage Aurell (1895–1976)
- Suzanne Axell (27 December 1955 – )
- Torbjörn Axelman (28 April 1932 – 25 February 2023)
- Henrik Alsterdal (14 October 1979)

Back to top

== B ==
- Fredrik Backman (2 June 1981 – )
- Bengt Bedrup (10 June 1928 – 27 March 2005)
- Johar Bendjelloul (1 September 1975 – )
- Jan-Olof Bengtsson (30 April 1952 – )
- Lasse Bengtsson (22 December 1951 – )
- Carina Bergfeldt (19 February 1980 – )
- Sven Bergman (12 November 1967 – )
- Erik Bergvall (7 April 1880 – 4 February 1950)
- Tobias Bjarneby (1974 – )
- Olle Björklund (28 June 1916 – 27 March 1981)
- Lisa Bjurwald (24 December 1978 – )
- August Blanche (17 September 1811 – 30 November 1868)
- Anders Blixt (1959 – )
- Maria-Pia Boëthius (1947 – )
- Frida Boisen (25 September 1974 – )
- Jeanette Bonnier (23 January 1934 – 16 April 2016)
- Maria Borelius (6 July 1960 – )
- Agneta Bolme Börjefors (26 April 1941 – 11 August 2008)
- Donald Boström (30 May 1954 – )
- Lasse Brandeby (27 April 1945 – 20 November 2011)
- Elin Brandell (1882–1963)
- Peter Bratt (29 April 1944 – )
- Jane Brick (12 June 1942 – 3 September 2016)

Back to top

== C ==
- Mustafa Can (15 October 1969 – )
- Lydia Capolicchio (7 January 1964 – )
- Ingrid Carlqvist (9 November 1960 – )
- Ebbe Carlsson (28 September 1947 – 3 August 1992)
- Reidar Carlsson (1957 – )
- Maria Cederschiöld (29 June 1856 – 19 October 1935)
- Cecilia Stegö Chilò (25 March 1959 – )
- John Chrispinsson (13 December 1956 – 3 April 2017)
- Anna Christensen (1936–2001)
- Sigrid Combüchen (16 January 1942 – )

Back to top

== D ==
- Stina Lundberg Dabrowski (3 December 1950 – )
- Axel Danielsson (15 December 1863 – 30 December 1899)
- Malcolm Dixelius (23 April 1948 – )
- Yukiko Duke (19 January 1966 – )

Back to top

== E ==
- Maryam Ebrahimi (28 May 1976 – )
- Cordelia Edvardson (1 January 1929 – 29 October 2012)
- Anders Ehnmark (2 June 1931 – 29 March 2019)
- Johan Ehrenberg (14 July 1957 – )
- Lennart Ekdal (19 November 1953 – )
- Kajsa Ekis Ekman (1980 – )
- Ulf Elfving (27 November 1942 – )
- Katia Elliott (23 April 1970 – )
- Sigrid Elmblad (28 May 1860 – 23 May 1926)
- Lars Engqvist (13 August 1945 – )
- Albert Engström (1869–1940)
- Louise Epstein (16 July 1965 – )
- Tony Ernst (31 October 1966 – )
- Göran Everdahl (11 November 1964 – )

Back to top

== F ==
- Hanna Fahl (23 October 1978 – )
- Bengt Fahlström (28 August 1938 – 23 February 2017)
- Sofi Fahrman (20 July 1979 – )
- Magnus Falkehed (30 September 1967 – )
- Bengt Feldreich (12 September 1925 – 21 October 2019)
- Helen Svensson Fletre (16 March 1909 – 15 March 1987)
- Louise Flodin (17 September 1828 – 20 March 1923)
- Emilia Fogelklou (20 July 1878 – 26 September 1972)
- Abraham Fornander (4 November 1812 – 1 November 1887)
- Cissi Elwin Frenkel (1 June 1965 – )
- Gustav Fridolin (10 May 1983 – )
- Ellen Fries (23 September 1855 – 31 March 1900)
- Gert Fylking (7 October 1945 – )

Back to top

== G ==
- Magda Gad (17 October 1975 – )
- Jan-Erik Garland (1905–1988)
- Tora Garm-Fex (1890–1973)
- Fredrik Gertten (3 April 1956 – )
- Kristian Gidlund (21 September 1983 – 17 September 2013)
- Jeanette Granberg (19 October 1825 – 2 April 1857)
- Louise Granberg (29 October 1812 – 28 December 1907)
- Göran Greider (1959 – )
- Bengt Grive (21 March 1921 – 17 September 2003)
- Humberto López y Guerra (12 August 1942 – )
- Jan Guillou (17 January 1944 – )
- Doris Gunnarsson (1945 – )

Back to top

== H ==
- Isobel Hadley-Kamptz (21 July 1976 – )
- Annika Hagström (11 October 1942 – )
- Jonas Hallberg (7 December 1944 – )
- Eva Hamilton (29 April 1954 – )
- Britta Hasso (1936–2015)
- Wendela Hebbe (9 September 1808 – 27 August 1899)
- Kristina Hedberg (4 March 1970 – )
- Anna Hedenmo (21 March 1961 – )
- Alfred Hedenstierna (1852–1906)
- Barbro Hedvall (8 February 1944 – )
- Hans-Eric Hellberg (11 May 1927 – 10 December 2016)
- Hanna Hellquist (24 July 1980 – )
- Gustaf Hellstrom (28 August 1882 – 27 February 1953)
- Leonardo Henrichsen (29 May 1940 – 29 June 1973)
- Anna Herdenstam (1965 – )
- Marie Hermanson (1956 – )
- Annika Hernroth-Rothstein (29 May 1981 – )
- Johanne Hildebrandt (15 April 1964 – )
- Carin Hjulström (31 August 1963 – )
- Elisabet Höglund (29 August 1944 – )
- Zeth Höglund (29 April 1884 – 13 August 1956)
- Bo Holmström (18 October 1938 – 12 October 2017)
- Karin Hübinette (18 April 1966 – )
- Catarina Hurtig (2 March 1975 – )
- Lennart Hyland (24 September 1919 – 15 March 1993)

Back to top

== I ==
- Dawit Isaak (28 October 1964 – )
- Anders Isaksson (9 May 1943 – 17 January 2009)

Back to top

== J ==
- Inger Jalakas (15 December 1951 – )
- Sven Jerring (8 December 1895 – 27 April 1979)
- Klara Johanson (6 October 1875 – 8 October 1948)
- Jonas Jonasson (6 July 1961 – )
- Runer Jonsson (29 June 1916 – 29 October 2006)
- Håkan Jörgensen (1969 – )
- Janne Josefsson (27 June 1952 – )
- Håkan Juholt (16 September 1962 – )
- Christina Jutterström (27 March 1940 – )

Back to top

== K ==
- Sigrid Kahle (18 September 1928 – 31 December 2013)
- Kristina Kappelin (13 April 1958 – )
- Salam Karam (9 March 1975 – )
- Nuri Kino (25 February 1965 – )
- Else Kleen (1882–1968)
- Helle Klein (9 July 1966 – )
- Anja Kontor (18 December 1964 – )
- Anders Kraft (18 October 1968 – )
- Annette Kullenberg (9 January 1939 – 28 January 2021)
- Björn Kumm (1938 – )
- Andres Küng (13 September 1945 – 10 December 2002)

Back to top

== L ==
- David Lagercrantz (4 September 1962 – )
- Karin Lannby (13 April 1916 – 19 November 2007)
- Milène Larsson
- Fredrik Laurin (4 March 1964 – )
- Marie Lehmann (14 March 1965 – )
- Michael Leijnegard (11 August 1964 – )
- Mark Levengood (10 July 1964 – )
- Sven Lindahl (25 June 1937 – )
- Christina Lindberg (6 December 1950 – )
- Bengt Linder (26 July 1929 – 17 April 1985)
- Anna Lindmarker (5 January 1961 – )
- Bosse Lindquist (1954 – )
- Herman Lindqvist (1 April 1943 – )
- Ulla Lindström (15 September 1909 – 10 July 1999)
- Bertil Lintner (1953 – )
- Anna-Lena Lodenius (30 June 1958 – )
- Ivar Lo-Johansson (23 February 1901 – 11 April 1990)
- Ebba Lövenskiold (7 October 1977 – )

Back to top

== M ==
- Tomas Mattias Löw (17 September 1970 – )
- Fredrik Malm (2 May 1977 – )
- Ture Malmgren (7 June 1851 – 3 August 1922)
- Anna Mannheimer (5 July 1963 – )
- Clara Mannheimer (13 September 1968 – )
- Katrine Marçal (24 October 1983 – )
- Mona Masri (16 January 1985 – )
- Sven Melander (30 October 1947 – 31 March 2022)
- Lena Mellin (27 November 1954 – )
- Margareta Momma (1702–1772)
- Tara Moshizi (23 August 1983 – )

Back to top

== N ==
- Ture Nerman (18 May 1886 – 7 October 1969)
- Carolina Neurath (17 November 1985 – )
- Harald Norbelie (5 October 1944 – 6 September 2015)
- Jenny Nordberg
- Thomas Nordegren (20 February 1953 – )
- Roger Nordin (24 April 1977 – )
- Ester Blenda Nordström (31 March 1891 – 15 October 1948)
- Emil Norlander (1865–1935)
- Birger Norman (30 July 1914 – 13 September 1995)

Back to top

== O ==
- Ingemar Odlander (29 February 1936 – 19 July 2014)
- Per T. Ohlsson (3 March 1958 – 27 October 2021)
- Daniel Öhman (20 May 1973 – )
- Siewert Öholm (7 August 1939 – 25 January 2017)
- Rosalie Olivecrona (9 December 1823 – 4 June 1898)
- Jan Olof Olsson (31 March 1920 – 30 April 1974)
- Leif "Loket" Olsson (12 July 1942 – )
- Vladimir Oravsky (22 January 1947 – )

Back to top

== P ==
- August Palm (5 February 1849 – 14 March 1922)
- Christian Palme (15 July 1952 – )
- Christina Patterson (1963 – )
- Anders Paulrud (14 May 1951 – 6 January 2008)
- Håkan Persson
- Mats Persson (1978 – )
- Agneta Pleijel (1940 – )
- Anders Pontén (16 September 1934 – 12 January 2009)
- Constans Pontin (19 April 1819 – 30 September 1852)
- Daniel Poohl (11 August 1981 – )
- Set Poppius (11 October 1885 – 10 December 1972)
- Madeleine Pousette (1943 – )

Back to top

== Q ==
Back to top

== R ==
- Lucette Rådström (3 December 1974 – )
- Pär Rådström (1925–1963)
- Karolina Ramqvist (8 November 1976 – )
- Hannes Råstam (1956 – 12 January 2012)
- Fredrik Renander (9 November 1980 – )
- Marimba Roney (24 May 1976 – )
- Göran Rosenberg (11 October 1948 – )
- Andreas Rosenlund (13 April 1967 – )
- Evin Rubar (14 December 1975 – )
- Folke Rydén (17 September 1958 – )
- Sven Rydenfelt (23 January 1911 – 15 February 2005)

Back to top

== S ==
- Hilda Sachs (13 March 1857 – 26 February 1935)
- Åsa Sandell (24 January 1967 – )
- Jan Sandquist (6 August 1932 – )
- Nima Sarvestani (22 December 1958 – )
- Jan Scherman (21 June 1950 – )
- Martin Schibbye (17 October 1980 – )
- Wilhelmine Schröder (23 September 1839 – 13 May 1924)
- Alex Schulman (17 February 1976 – )
- Pontus Schultz (22 August 1972 – 25 August 2012)
- Steve Sem-Sandberg (16 August 1958 – )
- Israel Shamir (1947 – )
- Jonas Sima (31 May 1937 – )
- Per Sinding-Larsen (6 September 1965 – )
- Malou von Sivers (15 January 1953 – )
- Rickard Sjöberg (12 August 1969 – )
- Thomas Sjöberg (1958 – )
- Arne Skoog (1913 – 7 June 1999)
- Staffan Skott (16 August 1943 – 24 September 2021)
- Linda Skugge (9 October 1973 – )
- Lena Smedsaas (20 March 1951 – 6 January 2014)
- Jan Söderqvist (1961 – )
- Sören Sommelius (1941 – )
- Frida Stéenhoff (11 December 1865 – 22 June 1945)
- Dilsa Demirbag Sten (10 October 1969 – )
- Hanna Stjärne (17 March 1969 – )
- Svante Stockselius (31 December 1955 – )
- Sven Stolpe (24 August 1905 – 26 August 1996)
- Fredrik Strage (22 December 1972 – )
- Ingela Strandberg (26 February 1944 – )
- Mats Strandberg (1976 – )
- Fredrik Strömberg (14 July 1968 – )
- Jenny Strömstedt (2 August 1972 – )
- Oscar Patric Sturzen-Becker (1811–1869)
- Margareta Suber (2 November 1892 – 6 April 1984)
- Maria Sveland (1974 – )
- Niklas Svensson (15 January 1973 – )
- Ebba von Sydow (18 February 1981 – )
- Stefan Szende (10 April 1901 – 5 May 1985)

Back to top

== T ==
- Gellert Tamas (1963 – )
- Annika Thor (2 July 1950 – )
- Steffo Törnquist (12 January 1956 – )

Back to top

== U ==
- Cecilia Uddén (28 October 1960 – )

Back to top

== V ==
- Fredrik Virtanen (15 November 1971 – )

Back to top

== W ==
- Ria Wägner (1914–1999)
- David Emanuel Wahlberg (9 September 1882 – 7 March 1949)
- Stefan Wahlberg (1966 – )
- Per Wahlöö (5 August 1926 – 22 June 1975)
- Johannes Wahlström (1981 – )
- Axel Wallengren (26 January 1865 – 4 December 1896)
- Olle Wästberg (6 May 1945 – 10 October 2023)
- Lisa Wede (27 September 1951 – )
- Per Wendel (28 January 1947 – 10 October 2005)
- Hildegard Werner (1 March 1834 – 29 August 1911)
- Ingrid Segerstedt Wiberg (18 June 1911 – 21 May 2010)
- Siv Widerberg (12 June 1931 – 24 December 2020)
- Tomas Andersson Wij (6 February 1972 – )
- Erik Wijk (1963 – )
- Hans Wiklund (17 September 1964 – )
- Peter Wolodarski (15 April 1978 – )
- Ola Wong (6 January 1977 – )
- George Wood (10 August 1949 – )

Back to top

== X ==
Back to top

== Y ==
Back to top

== Z ==
- Maciej Zaremba (12 March 1951 – )
- Alexandra Zazzi (7 June 1966 – )
- Helena von Zweigbergk (18 February 1959 – )

Back to top
