= All You Need Is Love: The Story of Popular Music =

American documentary series

- 2008 DVD release cover
- Genre: Documentary
- Directed by: Tony Palmer
- Starring: Various performing artists and music experts
- Countries of origin: United States; United Kingdom
- Original language: English
- No. of seasons: 1
- No. of episodes: 17

Production
- Executive producer: Richard Pilbrow
- Producer: Neville C. Thompson
- Editors: Tony Palmer; Xavier Russell; Luke Jeans
- Running time: 60 min. per episode
- Production company: London Weekend Television

Original release
- Network: ITV
- Release: February 12 – June 4, 1977

All You Need Is Love: The Story of Popular Music is a 17-part television documentary series on the history of modern pop music directed by Tony Palmer, originally broadcast worldwide between 1976 and 1980. The series covers some of the many different genres that have fallen under the "pop" label between the mid-19th century and 1976, including folk, ragtime, Tin Pan Alley, vaudeville and music hall, musical theatre, country, swing, jazz, blues, R&B, rock 'n' roll and others.

All You Need Is Love was born out of the reaction to his 1968 Omnibus episode on popular music called All My Loving which presented the music of the 1960s with no reference to the musical forms that preceded it. Around 1973, Palmer conceived of a 16-part documentary about American popular music which, after considerable shopping around, he convinced Bernard Delfont of EMI to bankroll. He proceeded to film over 300 interviews in approximately one million feet of film and was given access to archival footage of the same length. Instead of writing a script, he enlisted the help of a dozen or so subject matter experts who wrote 2000-word essays that became the narration for each part.

John Lennon was a friend and mentor to Palmer during the production of the series, and its title is taken from the Lennon-penned 1967 Beatles song, "All You Need Is Love". Although punk rock had entered the pop music scene while the series was being constructed, Palmer was refused the funding and time to include the genre in All You Need Is Love.

== Episodes ==
The fifteen-hour-long documentary features interviews and performances (both archived and original footage) involving such notable acts as Bing Crosby, Bo Diddley, Jerry Lee Lewis, Elvis Presley, The Beatles, Bob Dylan, The Byrds, Leonard Cohen, Ike & Tina Turner and many others.

The series features a rare interview with the notoriously reclusive 1960s record producer Phil Spector. During his segment, a visibly intoxicated Spector performs an impromptu version of "Then I Kissed Her" solo and acoustic in his mansion home, a song which he originally wrote and produced for The Crystals in 1963. Palmer would later reveal that he had been coaxed into playing Russian roulette with Spector during the course of the evening.

The series features the only interview ever given by the mother of Beatles manager Brian Epstein. A tour of Harlem is given by John Hammond, the record executive who was instrumental in furthering the careers of Billie Holiday, Count Basie, Bob Dylan, Aretha Franklin and countless others. Other musical figures featured include Rudi Blesh, Liberace, Eubie Blake, and Charles Aznavour.

| No. | Title | Screenwriter | Original release date |
|---|---|---|---|
| 1 | "Introductory Programme" | Tony Palmer | February 12, 1977 |
Themes; Episode preview Personalities; Joan Baez, The Beatles, The Bee Gees, Glen Campbell, Hoagy Carmichael, Eric Clapton, Bing Crosby, Duke Ellington, Ruth Etting, The Everly Brothers, Aretha Franklin, Judy Garland, Dizzy Gillespie, Billie Holiday, Jerry Lee Lewis, Liberace, Édith Piaf, Richard Rodgers, The Rolling Stones, Dusty Springfield, Muddy Waters, Wings
| 2 | "God's Children: The Beginnings" | Paul Oliver | February 19, 1977 |
Themes; African music, Old-time music, Emancipation, origins of ragtime, jazz, blues, and gospel music, minstrel shows Personalities; LeRoi Jones, Como, Mississippi Fife and Drum Band, Lightnin' Hopkins, Duke Ellington, Ray Charles, Jerry Wexler, Rufus Thomas, Big Bill Broonzy, Buck Ram, The Platters, James Brown, John Hammond, The Staple Singers, Fela Ransome Kuti, Segun Bugna Troupe, Paul Oliver, Ginger Baker, Tina Turner, Tunji Oyelana
| 3 | "I Can Hypnotise 'Dis Nation: Ragtime" | Rudi Blesh | February 26, 1977 |
Themes; Alexander's Ragtime Band, Cakewalk, the Maple Leaf Club, Minstrel show, Ragtime, Treemonisha Personalities; Scott Joplin, Terry Waldo, Eubie Blake, Como, Mississippi Fife and Drum Band, R. L. Burnside, Christy's Minstrels, Stephen Foster, John Stark, Axel Christensen, Max Collie's Rhythm Aces, Houston Grand Opera, Monica Mason
| 4 | "Jungle Music: Jazz" | Leonard Feather | March 5, 1977 |
Themes; Two-step music, Storyville, Original Dixieland Jass Band, Cotton Club, Harlem Renaissance, Racial segregation in the United States, classical jazz Personalities; George Shearing, Al Rose, Chick Corea, Hoagy Carmichael, Armand Hug All Stars, Bix Beiderbecke, Kid Ory, Louis Armstrong and His Hot Seven, Earl Hines, John Hammond, Duke Ellington, Irving Mills, Jack Teagarden, Count Basie, Pinetop Smith, Paul Whiteman, Dizzy Gillespie, Charlie Parker, John Lewis, Dave Brubeck, Miles Davis Quintet, John Coltrane, Charles Mingus, Ian Carr, Norma Winstone, Michael Gibbs
| 5 | "Who's That Comin'?: Blues" | Paul Oliver | March 12, 1977 |
Themes; Beale Street, desegregation, Café Society Personalities; Memphis Slim, Lt. George W. Lee, Johnny and Verlina Woods, Roosevelt Sykes, W. C. Handy, Willie "The Lion" Smith, Blind Arvella Gray, Son House, Ray Charles, Mamie Smith, Victoria Spivey, Bessie Smith, John Hammond, George Melly, Muddy Waters, Lead Belly, John Lomax, Jimmy Dawkins, Mighty Joe Young, Billie Holiday, Barney Josephson, B.B. King, Martin Luther King Jr.
| 6 | "Rude Songs: Vaudeville & Music Hall" | David Cheshire | March 19, 1977 |
Themes; The Las Vegas Strip, Sadler's Wells Theatre, Heritage Square Music Hall, Burlington Bertie, male impersonator, English pantomime, female impersonator, King George V Coronation Royal Variety Performance, minstrel show, burlesk, "Applause", competition from phonograph records, radio, and talking pictures Personalities; The Duncan Sisters, Liberace, Sylvie Vartan, Irving Caesar, Mrs Shufflewick, Mae West, Charles Morton, Florrie Forde, George Labor, Clara Bow, Flanagan and Allen, Harry Lauder, William Hammerstein (son of Oscar Hammerstein II), Vesta Tilley, Peter John, Danny La Rue, Joe E. Howard, Nick Lucas, Édith Piaf, Charles Aznavour, Marie Kendall, Gus Elen, Marie Lloyd, Little Tich, Marlene Dietrich, Maurice Chevalier, Judy Garland, Wilson and Keppel
| 7 | "Always Chasing Rainbows: Tin Pan Alley" | Ian Whitcomb | March 26, 1977 |
Themes "After the Ball", "Hello! Ma Baby", How to Write a Popular Song, ready-made songs, Denmark Street, song pluggers, "Rhapsody in Blue", "The Gold Diggers' Song (We're in the Money)", ASCAP, rise of country music, BMI Personalities; Irving Caesar, Chas. K. Harris, Ian Whitcomb, Yip Harburg, Harry Von Tilzer, Pickers Sisters, Mickey Addy, Eddie Rogers, Dana Suesse, Hoagy Carmichael, Russell Sanjek, Bing Crosby, Perry Como, Irving Berlin, Mabel Wayne, Rudy Vallée, Al Jolson, Paul Whiteman, Harry Warren, Harold Arlen, George Gershwin, Ed Cramer, Bob Wills and the Texas Playboys, Bill Monroe, The Carter Family, Johnny Green
| 8 | "Diamonds as Big as the Ritz: The Musical" | Stephen Sondheim | April 2, 1977 |
Themes; Broadway theatre, Company, Chicago, evolution from burlesk, operetta, revue, and vaudeville, Louie the 14th (1925 film), Show Boat, Oklahoma!, On Your Toes, Hair, The Who's Tommy, A Little Night Music, The Leaf People Personalities; Ken Russell, Stephen Sondheim, George M. Cohan, Harold Prince, Bob Fosse, Florenz Ziegfeld Jr., Rodgers and Hart, John Heawood, Oscar Hammerstein II, Rouben Mamoulian, Richard Rodgers, Agnes de Mille, Joseph Papp, Galt MacDermot, Elton John, Tina Turner, Glynis Johns, Tom O'Horgan, Dennis Reardon, Lionel Bart
| 9 | "Swing That Music!: Swing" | Humphrey Lyttelton | April 9, 1977 |
Themes; Evolution from Jazz, segregation, Great Depression, "Begin the Beguine", American Federation of Musicians ban on recording 1947–1948, competition from television Personalities; Cab Calloway, Nick LaRocca, Original Dixieland Jass Band, Hugues Panassié, Benny Goodman, Guy Lombardo and His Royal Canadians, Lawrence Welk, Artie Shaw, Willie "The Lion" Smith, Bud Freeman, Art Tatum, Dick Vance, Fletcher Henderson, Lionel Hampton, Teddy Wilson, Benny Goodman Quartet, Gene Krupa, Buddy Rich, Woody Herman, Bing Crosby, Tommy Dorsey, Frank Sinatra, Harry James, James Petrillo, Ella Fitzgerald
| 10 | "Good Times: Rhythm and Blues" | Nik Cohn | April 16, 1977 |
Themes; Billboard magazine, Evolution from Race music, Soul music, Rhythm and blues, Work songs/Field hollers, Spirituals, "Joy Cometh in the Mornin'", Southern Gospel Personalities; Bo Diddley, Jerry Wexler, Lefty Diz, Wilson Pickett, The Chiffons, Berry Gordy, The Supremes, The Fisk Jubilee Singers, LeRoi Jones, Rev Chester Berryhill, Daneel No. 2 Youth Choir, Aretha Franklin, Stevie Wonder, Pat Boone's Daughters, Jerry Goff, The LeFevres, The Diamonds, Jerry Leiber and Mike Stoller, Bill Haley & His Comets, Pat Boone, Earl King and the Meters, Johnnie Ray, The Platters, The Buck Ram Platters, Phil Spector, Ike & Tina Turner, Sam Phillips, Elvis Presley, Buddy Holly
| 11 | "Making Moonshine: Country Music" | Nik Cohn | April 23, 1977 |
Themes; Country Music Hall of Fame, Ozark Folk Center, Evolution from Anglo-American folksong, Grand Ole Opry, Bluegrass music, Grand Ole Gospel Time Personalities; Minnie Pearl, Doug Kershaw, Richard Nixon, Carl Butler and Pearl, William Ivey, Jimmy Driftwood, Tommy Simmons, Bennie Hess, Jimmie Rodgers and the Hillbillies, Brooke Breeding Tweddell, Ernest Tubb, Uncle Dave Macon, Roy Acuff, George D. Hay, Carlton Haney, The Seldom Scene, Bill Monroe, Roy Rogers, The Sons of the Pioneers, Dale Evans, Marty Manning, Tex Ritter, Larry Yurdkin, David Allan Coe, Bill Anderson, Jimmy Snow, Webb Pierce, Troy Hess, Brooke Breeding (uncredited)
| 12 | "Go Down, Moses!: Songs of War and Protest" | Charles Chilton | April 30, 1977 |
Themes "My Country, 'Tis of Thee", "Yankee Doodle", "Dixie", Presidential Campaign of 1840, "Land of Hope and Glory", Songs of Freedom, "The Battle Hymn of Lt. Calley", "The Killers That Run the Other Countries", Hollywood blacklist, People's Songs, Hootenanny (US TV series) Personalities; Leonard Cohen, Pete Seeger, Arlo Guthrie, Vera Brodsky Lawrence, Yip Harburg, Bing Crosby, Glenn Miller, Vera Lynn, The Andrews Sisters, Woody Guthrie, The Weavers, Bob Dylan, The Kingston Trio, Peter, Paul and Mary, Leon Rosselson, Joan Baez, Country Joe McDonald, John Marshall, James Simmons, Ireland's Freemen
| 13 | "Hail! Hail! Rock'n'Roll!: Rock and Roll" | Jack Good | May 7, 1977 |
Themes "That's All Right", "Blue Moon of Kentucky", "Heartbreak Hotel", "Blue Suede Shoes", "Hound Dog", Evolution from Race music and Rhythm and blues, The Twist, Skiffle, "Six-Five Special", Be-Bop-A-Lula, Elvis Presley's Army career Personalities; Elvis Presley, Sam Phillips, Jerry Lee Lewis, Conway Twitty, Pat Boone, Colonel Tom Parker, Carl Perkins, Jack Good, Rev. Jimmy Snow, Little Richard, Chuck Berry, Chubby Checker, Lonnie Donegan, Tommy Steele, Terry Dere, Cliff Richard, Bill Haley & His Comets, Gene Vincent, Wee Willie Harris, The Shadows, Bobby Darin, Nancy Sinatra, Bobby Vinton
| 14 | "Mighty Good: The Beatles" | Derek Taylor | May 14, 1977 |
Themes "Twist and Shout", The Cavern Club, The Beatles in Hamburg, The Beatles' 1965 US tour, Bobby soxers, Skiffle, Mersey Beat, Summer of Love, Jane Fonda's birthday party, "House of the Rising Sun", Apple Boutique, Monterey Pop Festival, "All You Need Is Love", "Eight Miles High", "More popular than Jesus", Brian Epstein's death Personalities; Paul McCartney, Allan Williams, Brian Epstein, George Martin, John Lennon, Murray the K, Derek Taylor, Roger McGuinn, Mike Love, The Beach Boys, Carl Wilson, Donovan, Bill Graham, The Animals, Ravi Shankar, George Harrison, The Mamas & the Papas, Tommy Charles, WACI, Robert Shelton (Ku Klux Klan)
| 15 | "All Along the Watchtower: Sour Rock" | none | May 21, 1977 |
Themes; Altamont Free Concert, Ready Steady Go!, Apple Boutique, Bed-In, deaths of Morrison, Joplin, Hendrix, Brian Jones Personalities; Mick Jagger and The Rolling Stones, Bill Graham, Thomas "Rev. T." Corbishley, Lord Stow Hill, Eric Burdon, Jimi Hendrix, Frank Zappa & The Mothers of Invention, Pink Floyd, The Who, Kit Lambert, Bill Wyman, Donovan, Vicki Wickham, Alexis Korner, Clive Epstein, Jim Morrison, The Doors, Myra Friedman, Janis Joplin, The Animals, Peter Rudge
| 16 | "Whatever Gets You Through the Night: Glitter Rock" | Lester Bangs | May 28, 1977 |
Themes; Commercialism, hypocrisy, immaturity Personalities; Kiss, Donny & Marie, Alice Cooper, David Bowie, Jethro Tull, Clive Davis, Ian Anderson, Keith Moon, Don Kirshner, Elton John, Roxy Music, Emerson, Lake & Palmer, Helen Reddy, Gary Glitter, Labelle, Eric Clapton, Cream, Bob Marley & The Wailers
| 17 | "Imagine: New Directions" | none | June 4, 1977 |
Themes "In Coventry Cathedral", Muzak Holdings, The Jingle Factory, economics of the music industry, Ommadawn Personalities; Black Oak Arkansas, Lester Bangs, Rev. Jack Wyrtzen, Butch Stone, Jim Dandy, Electric Light Orchestra, Stomu Yamash'ta, Lee Valvoda, Jack Brokensha, Jack Bruce, Michael John Bowen, Terry Garthwaite and Toni Brown, Tangerine Dream, Manfred Mann, Baker Gurvitz Army, Mike Oldfield, Richard Branson

A companion book authored by Palmer was released in 1976 by Grossman Publishers/Viking Press. The book notes that the series was jointly produced by Theatre Projects Film Productions, EMI Television Productions and PolyGram.

A five-disc DVD of the series was released in 2008.

== Reviews and criticism ==
The film's DVD release's cover cited reviews from a handful of noteworthy musicians: John Lennon called the film "A monumental achievement" and thanked Palmer for creating the series; Bing Crosby hailed its editing and deemed it a "priceless archive"; and Pete Seeger said that "its colossal emotional, intellectual and history range is breathtaking."

All You Need Is Love was given an "A" rating by Entertainment Weekly, called "a musical education in a box" by Blender, and Q Magazine reviewed it as "an impressive achievement, scholarly, opinionated and entertaining, seamlessly blending archive and fresh footage with an impressive cast of talking heads."

This documentary has been criticized for having a bias towards rock music. Disco music was completely ignored, as were most popular artists from the pre-rock music era who were not associated with being a precursor to rock music.

When the "Mighty Good: The Beatles" episode was given a Blu-ray release in 2013 Michael Dodd of Bring The Noise UK noted that it was intriguing how "in following the timeline of the band the film also establishes a kind of blueprint which every hugely successful rock act would follow", citing the accusations of selling out and moral panic of the "more popular than Jesus" incident.
