= Boisen =

Boisen is a surname. Notable people with the surname include:

- Anton Boisen (1876–1965), American chaplain
- Elisabeth Boisen (1850–1919), Danish composer
- Frida Boisen (born 1974), Swedish journalist and author
- Myles Boisen (born 1956), American guitarist, composer and sound engineer
