= Ekdal =

Ekdal is a Swedish surname. Notable people with the surname include:

- Albin Ekdal (born 1989), Swedish footballer
- Hjalmar Ekdal (born 1998), Swedish footballer
- Lennart Ekdal (born 1953), Swedish journalist and television host
