= Tora Garm-Fex =

Swedish journalist and writer

Tora Garm Fex

Tora Garm-Fex (1890–1973) was a Swedish journalist and the very first female Swedish war correspondent sent abroad in a professional capacity and by a major Swedish newspaper.

She was born in 1890 in Vänersborg, Sweden to N. O. Jonzon, Håbol (1852–1922) and Emma Carolina Strömberg (1856–1924) and married in 1921 to Filip Fex, Stockholm.

She worked as a journalist for the following newspapers:

- Dagens Nyheter, Sweden 1914–18
- Vecko-Journalen, Sweden 1918–19
- Stockholms Dagblad, Sweden 1919–24

As correspondent she traveled to Russia, Finland, Italy, France, Scotland, Estonia, Germany and in 1923 on a grant to Iceland. She became a member of the Swedish Publicists' Association in 1916 and was associated with Ligan ('The League'), a network of female journalists in Stockholm that also included Elin Wägner, Elin Brandell, Ellen Rydelius and Gerda Marcus.

In early 1918 she was sent by Dagens Nyheter to revolutionary Russia and Petrograd as war correspondent. At that time German troops had invaded the West Estonian archipelago and threatened Petrograd with bombardment and invasion. It was merely weeks before the Bolsjeviks transferred its government to Moscow. During the course of her assignment she met and interviewed key Bolshevik leaders like Vladimir Lenin, Nadezhda Krupskaya, Alexandra Kollontai, Anatoliy Lunacharskiy, Maria Spiridonova and cultural notabilities like the painter Ilya Repin. She also relayed extensive and gritty observations from a street-level Petrograd and was nearly killed on several occasions.

Later that same year she published a book I bolsjevismens Petrograd (Aktiebolaget Ljus' Förlag, Stockholm, 1918) about her Russian journey. A highly dramatic and vivid portrayal of a Russia in transition it is now considered a milestone in early Swedish female foreign correspondence. Tora painted a new picture of the traveling reporter as someone who was capable of leaving conformity behind and face the unknown while at the same time maintaining an aura of the normality the reader was used to and could identify with. At the time this was a novel phenomenon in Swedish travel literature. The book told about a society in disintegration but also about how a reporter could appear while on assignment. In addition, it did not reflect any ideological preferences but rather displayed an objective view on history in making.

Tora was also active as film critic and chronicler under pseudonyms like "Masque", "Sita" and "Rosine".

Post-1924 she left journalism behind and settled down to raise a family. In 1965, she recorded her reminiscences for a programme broadcast on Swedish national radio, Sveriges Radio.

Excerpts from I bolsjevismens Petrograd translated into Russian for the first time by Elena Dahl were published in the November 2017 edition of Russian literary magazine Inostrannaya Literatura.

2018 saw her added into The Biographical Dictionary of Swedish Women (SKBL), an archive maintained by the National Resource Library for Gender Studies at the University of Gothenburg. The dictionary contains biographies of one thousand women who, across several centuries and in many different ways, have contributed to society's development, both within Sweden and beyond.

Furthermore, commemorative speeches on Tora were held in 2018 at the Gothenburg Book Fair and at the Vänersborgs Museum by Kristina Lundgren, Associate Professor in Journalism at the Södertörn University in Stockholm.

I bolsjevismens Petrograd was translated into English in 2026 and is available on Amazon.
