= Imagine (book) =

Imagine: A Socialist Vision for the 21st Century
- Author: Alan McCombes; Tommy Sheridan
- Language: English
- Subject: Socialism
- Publisher: Rebel Incorporated
- Publication date: 2000
- Publication place: United Kingdom
- Media type: Print (Hardback)
- Pages: 252
- ISBN: 978-1841950563

Imagine: A Socialist Vision for the 21st Century is a book by Alan McCombes and Tommy Sheridan, former high-profile figures in the Scottish Socialist Party. It graphically describes the inequalities of capitalism and shows the need for a socialist alternative, while remaining "free from jargon and dogma". It has been compared to The Global Trap and the work of Swedish author Johan Ehrenberg.
