= Pontén =

Pontén is a surname. Notable people with the surname include:

- Anders Pontén (1934–2009), Swedish author, journalist, and actor
- Gunilla Pontén (1929–2019), Swedish fashion designer
- Gunvor Pontén (1929–2023), Swedish actress
- Henrik Pontén (1965–2020), Swedish jurist
- Tomas Pontén (1946–2015), Swedish actor and director
