= Marie Lehmann =

Marie Lehmann may refer to

- Marie Lehmann (soprano) (1851–1931), German soprano
- Marie Lehmann (journalist) (born 1965), Swedish sports journalist and television host
