= Anna Olsdotter Arnmar =

Swedish journalist

- Born: Anna Helena Olsdotter Bergman; June 22, 1963 (age 62); Sundbyberg Municipality, Sweden
- Occupation: Journalist
- Spouse: Leif Arnmar (2004-)
- Parent(s): Olle Bergman; Estelle Christensen
- Relatives: Basse Wickman (half-brother); Maria Wickman (half-sister); Axel Christensen (grandfather on mother's side)

Anna Helena Olsdotter Arnmar, born Bergman on 22 June 1963 in Sundbyberg Municipality, Sweden, is a Swedish television journalist and presenter.

Anna Olsdotter has worked on Ekot at Sveriges Radio, Expressen, TV3, Arbetet and Kvällsposten. In 1998 she came to Sveriges Television where she has been a reporter, news presenter, and contributing editor. She was also involved in creating the digital news channel SVT24.

She is the daughter to the musician and composer Olle Bergman and Estell, née Christensen. Anna is also, on her mother's side, half-sister to Basse Wickman and Maria Wickman. She is also granddaughter to Axel Christensen.

== Threats ==
During the summer 2005 did Anna Olsdotter Arnmar and Anna Hedenmo received letters which threatened to kill and rape them.

The man who sent these letters was convicted on 8 November 2007 to six months in prison for "olaga hot och ofredande", which basically means unlawful deprivation of liberty and threats of molestation.

The person was also convicted to pay Anna Olsdotter Arnmar 5,000 SEK (~ $790.27 or £376.42 at the time) in damages.
