= Downfall (McCombes book) =

Book by Alan McCombes

Downfall: The Tommy Sheridan Story
- Author: Alan McCombes
- Language: English
- Publisher: Birlinn
- Publication date: 2011
- Publication place: Scotland
- Media type: Print
- Pages: 352
- ISBN: 978-1841587592

Downfall: The Tommy Sheridan Story is a book by Alan McCombes, former policy co-ordinator of the Scottish Socialist Party (SSP) and editor of the Scottish Socialist Voice, about the political career of Tommy Sheridan, who led the SSP for several years until he was forced to resign amid allegations about his personal life, eventually leaving the party a few years before his eventual conviction for perjury.

McCombes finished writing the book—described by The Scotsman as "the first insider's account of the fall-out from Sheridan's trips to a Manchester swinging club and his ill-fated decision to take on the News of the World after it published details of his sexual proclivities"—less than five months after Sheridan was jailed for committing perjury.

The book was launched on 6 July 2011 at Word Power Books, Scotland's oldest radical and independent bookshop.

== Reception ==
Paul Hutcheon described the book in The Herald as "brilliantly written", adding: "Most tomes on Scottish politics are barely worth reading, but McCombes's offering deserves to be read far beyond Scotland. Although written by a modest man, the book has a savage turn of phrase and a wonderful repertoire of metaphors."

James Doleman criticised it in The Scotsman for symbolising "the Manichean view of the case: good versus evil, light versus darkness", without accounting for any middle ground.

Gregor Gall, who went on to write his own book about the Sheridan affair, said Downfall presented "somewhat shallow" analysis, and that there was "an absence of the use of dialectics to explain how what happened happened".
