= Jan Scherman =

Swedish journalist

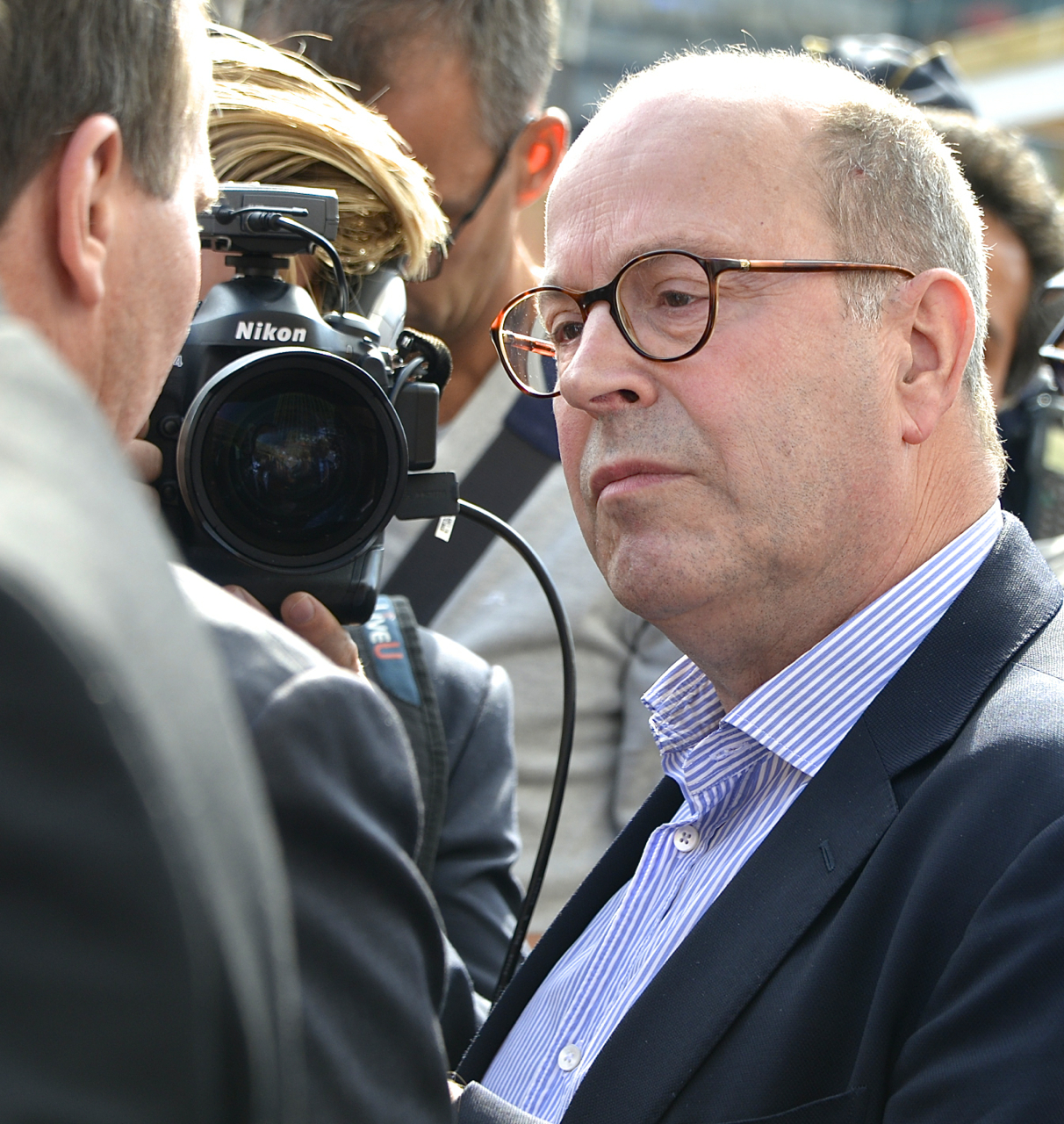
- Jan Scherman interviewing Prime Minister Stefan Löfven of Sweden during Election Day in September 2014
- Born: 21 June 1950; Filipstad

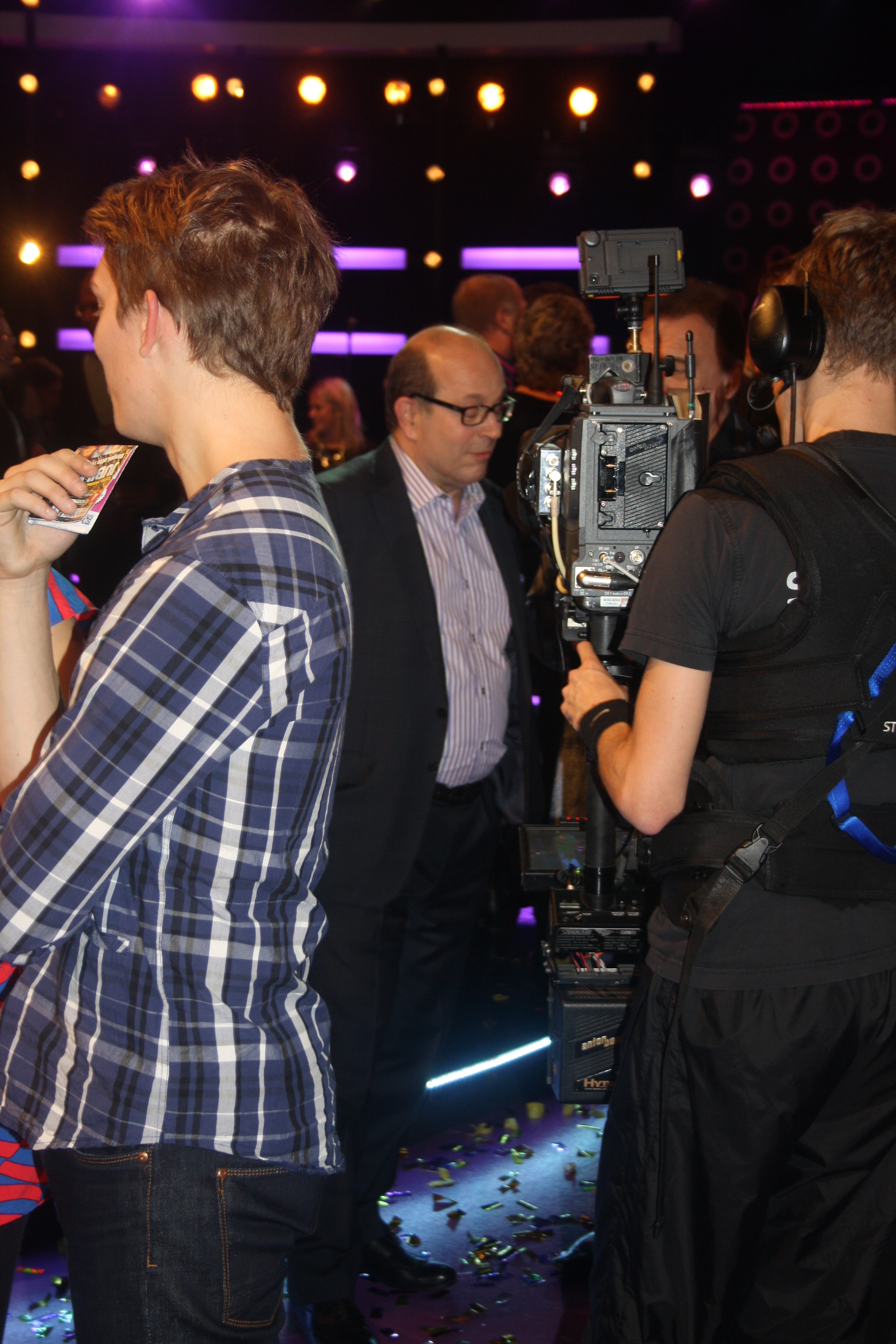
Jan Scherman in November 2011

Jan Olof Scherman (born 21 June 1950) is a Swedish journalist and previously CEO for the Sweden-based TV company TV4 AB. He is also second cousin of the recording artist Cat Stevens.

Scherman revealed in an interview in the radio program Ekots lördagsintervju, in early January 2004, that he had been threatened by Göran Persson after the end of broadcasting a debate between the party leaders on 10 September, before the 2002 election. According to Scherman, who retold the story both in an article in the newspaper Expressen a week later, and later before a Riksdag Committee, the Swedish prime minister had complained that the debate moderators, Lennart Ekdal and Alice Bah had done a bad job, and accused Scherman and his staff of "investing heavily" in a non-Socialist victory in the election, pointing out how this policy would lead to him making enemies in Rosenbad, the government offices in Stockholm, if the Social Democrats would retain power in the election. Scherman also claimed that it became more difficult for TV4 to get access to Persson after 10 September and pointed out Björn Rosengren, another prominent Social Democratic politician, had called him to complain that TV4 was biased against the Social Democrats. According to Scherman, Olof Palme and Carl Bildt had also had their own favorites among reporters, denying access to others. Scherman called it "a Swedish version of the Italian Berlusconi model". The issue was reported to the Riksdag Committee on the Constitution which questioned Scherman on the issue before the Committee on 15 April 2004 and Persson on 20 April.

In the interrogation with the Committee on the Constitution, Persson agreed that he had found the debate badly organised and the questioning of himself very aggressive. He admitted to having told Scherman what he thought about the debate at the buffet afterwards; he stated that he could not remember exactly how he expressed himself but denied having threatened Scherman and claimed that, had he done so, Scherman would obviously have made news out of it. He also denied having shown any partiality against TV4. As there were no witnesses to the conversation, the Committee concluded that it would not be possible to state with certainty what had been said.

Scherman is also known for having criticized the Stenbeck-owned Modern Times Group media corporation, the main owner of the competing channel TV3, which owned a part of TV4 AB and was represented on the board for sabotaging board meetings and working against the interest of TV4. MTG applied to be given the concession previously possessed by TV4. Scherman requested that MTG would sell their TV 4 shares Shortly after publicizing his claims concerning Persson, Scherman was himself accused of being a too powerful figure and compared to Silvio Berlusconi by Hans-Holger Albrecht, CEO of MTG, which owns the competing channel TV3. It was later reported that MTG sold their shares to the investment company Proventus, and in 2005 TV4 AB and MTG entered an agreement where TV4 AB channels would be distributed through the MTG-owned cable network Viasat.
