= Thalia (Swedish magazine) =

Avant-garde magazine in Sweden (1910–1913)

- Categories: Music magazine; Theatre magazine; Literary magazine
- Frequency: Weekly
- Founder: Gustaf Collijn
- Founded: 1910
- Final issue: 1913
- Country: Sweden
- Based in: Stockholm
- Language: Swedish

Thalia was an avant-garde theatre, music and literary magazine published in Stockholm, Sweden, between 1910 and 1913. Its title was a reference to the Greek muse, Thalia, patron of comedy. The magazine is known for being one of the publications which promoted avant-garde aesthetics in Sweden.

== History and profile ==
Thalia was established by Gustaf Collijn in Stockholm in 1910. Gustaf Collijn was also the publisher of the magazine which came out weekly. Its first subtitle was Scenisk konst och musik (Swedish: Performing arts and music), but it was changed as Tidning för scenisk konst och musik (Swedish: Magazine for performing arts and music) which was used until 1912. It was redesigned as Tidning för scenisk konst och litteratur (Swedish: Magazine for performing arts and literature) in 1912 and was employed until the demise of the magazine in 1913.

Gustaf Collijn and Andréas Hallén were the founding editors of Thalia. Gustaf Åsbrink, Gustaf Collijn and Andréas Hallén coedited the magazine from 1910 to 1911. Gustaf Collijn took over the post in 1911 which he held until 1913. Gerda Marcus was the assistant editor of the magazine between 1911 and 1913.

Its contributors were young and modernist writers from Sweden such as Henning Berger and Hjalmar Söderberg and other countries, including Lion Feuchtwanger, Sven Lange, Max Reinhardt and Pierre Mortier. Thalia contained work about the Italian futurism and featured one of the Italian poet Filippo Tommaso Marinetti’s manifestos which was published in 1912.

Thalia folded in 1913.
