= Fredrik Renander =

Swedish photojournalist

Fredrik Renander (born 9 November 1980) is a Swedish photojournalist, based in New Delhi in India and covering mainly South Asia.

== Career ==
He grew up in Sundsvall in Sweden and moved to Stockholm when he was 18. In 2003 he received a scholarship and worked at the Reuters New Delhi bureau after which he began to freelance.
