= Elisabeth Boisen =

Danish composer (1850–1919)

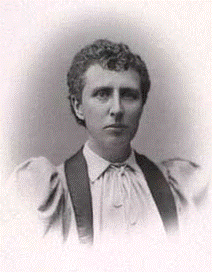
Elisabeth Boisen ca. 1880

Ane Elisabeth Susette Boisen (21 April 1850 – 7 July 1919) was a Danish composer.

Elisabeth Boisen was granddaughter of N. F. S. Grundtvig and her father, Peter Outzen Boisen, from 1851 was manager of the Queen Caroline Amalie Asylum School, which Grundtvig was the manager. From 1854 her father also worked as in Vartov Church. From 1868 to 1886 she taught at the school of this church.

Elisabet Boisen played the piano from early childhood and for several years trained under composer Emil Hornemann. She began composing at age 30 and published 30 or so pieces over the period 1893–1918. The majority of texts were written by Ingeborg Kristiane Rosenørns-Teilmann, with whom she shared a home from 1887 to 1919.
