= Kristina Kappelin =

Swedish journalist and author

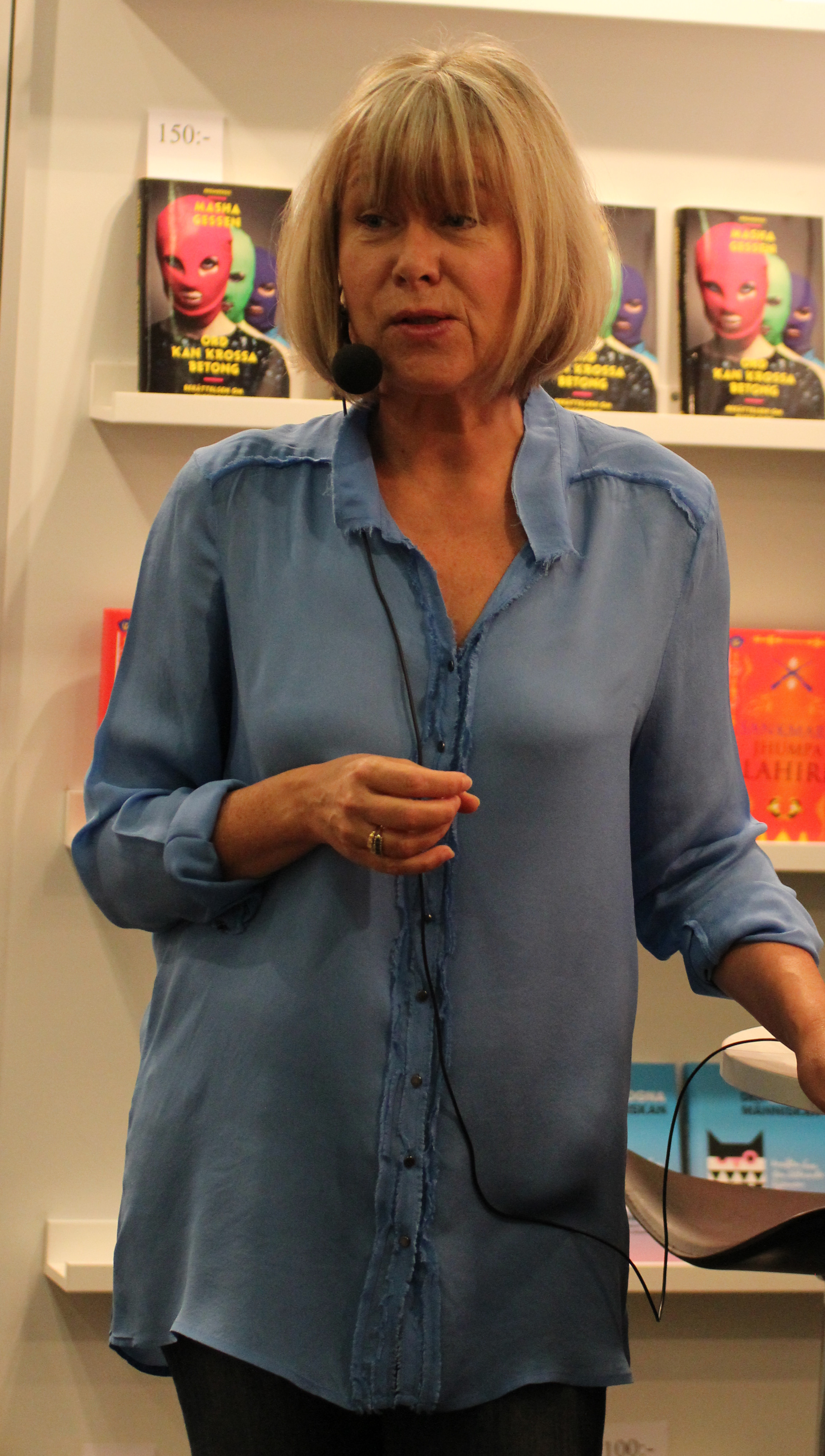
- Kappelin in 2014
- Born: 13 April 1958 (age 68); Stockholm, Sweden
- Occupations: Journalist, author

Anna Kristina Kappelin (born 13 April 1958) is a Swedish journalist and author residing in Rome, Italy. She has been a foreign correspondent in Italy for SVT, and wrote columns for Dagens industri and Sydsvenskan. She reports mainly for politics and sports in Italy. From January 2018 she is CEO and curator of the Swedish Villa San Michele cultural center on Capri. Kappelin has a Bachelor of Arts completed in film and theater history, sociology and culture communication at Lund University. She also studied journalism at Journalisthögskolan in Gothenburg and Johns Hopkins School of Advanced International Studies in Bologna. She has had several books published in Italy.

== Bibliography ==
- 1994 – Italien inifrån: familjen, makten och hela härligheten
- 2000 – Sverige och Italien = Svezia e Italia
- 2007 – Rom: maten, människorna, livet
- 2010 – Berlusconi – italienaren
- 2014 – Italiensk dagbok
