= Alfred Hedenstierna =

Swedish author

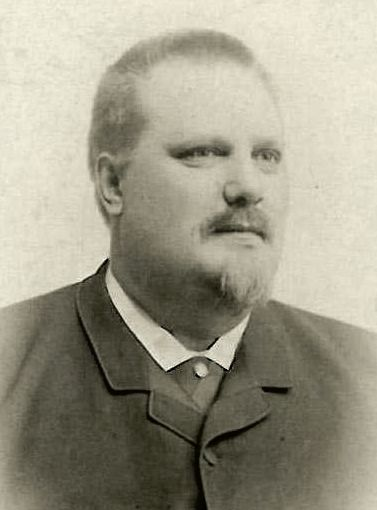

Karl Joseph Alfred Hedenstierna (1852-1906) was a Swedish writer.

== Biography ==
He was born at Skeda in the Småland province. In 1879, he joined the staff of the Smålandsposten at Växjö, and in 1890 was made editor-in-chief of that newspaper. In addition to several volumes descriptive of Swedish peasant life, he wrote a series of humorous articles, published weekly in the Posten over the pseudonym “Sigurd.” A selection of the latter articles were collected and translated into German by Krusenstierna and Langfeldt, and entitled Allerlei Leute (Leipzig, 1892–97).
