= Pamela Andersson =

Swedish journalist (born 1965)

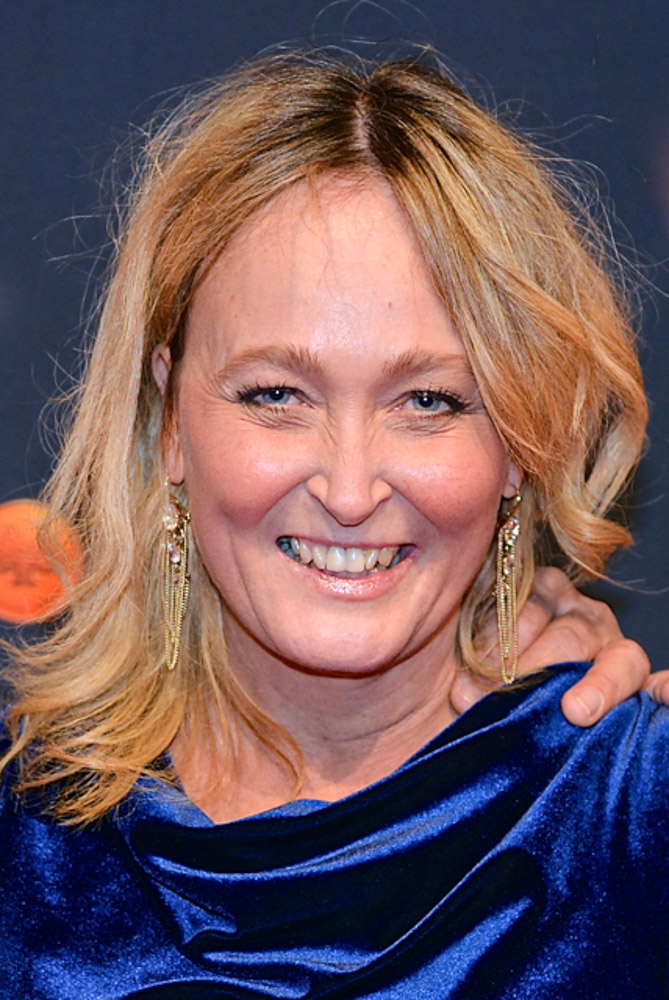
- Andersson in 2014
- Born: Pamela Kristina Andersson; 13 March 1965 (age 61); Hudiksvall, Sweden
- Occupation: Journalist
- Spouse: Magnus Alselind

Pamela Kristina Alselind, (née Andersson, born 13 March 1965) is a Swedish journalist that writes for Expressen and the magazine Amelia. In 2006 she participated in the SVT show På spåret along with Tomas Bolme.

Since 1993, she has also been a member of the sports panel at Gomorron Sverige, which is broadcast on SVT. She was the editor in chief for the magazine Queen. And she is since 2010 the editor in chief for the magazine S.

Andersson is a cancer survivor.
