= Tara Moshizi =

Swedish radio presenter and journalist

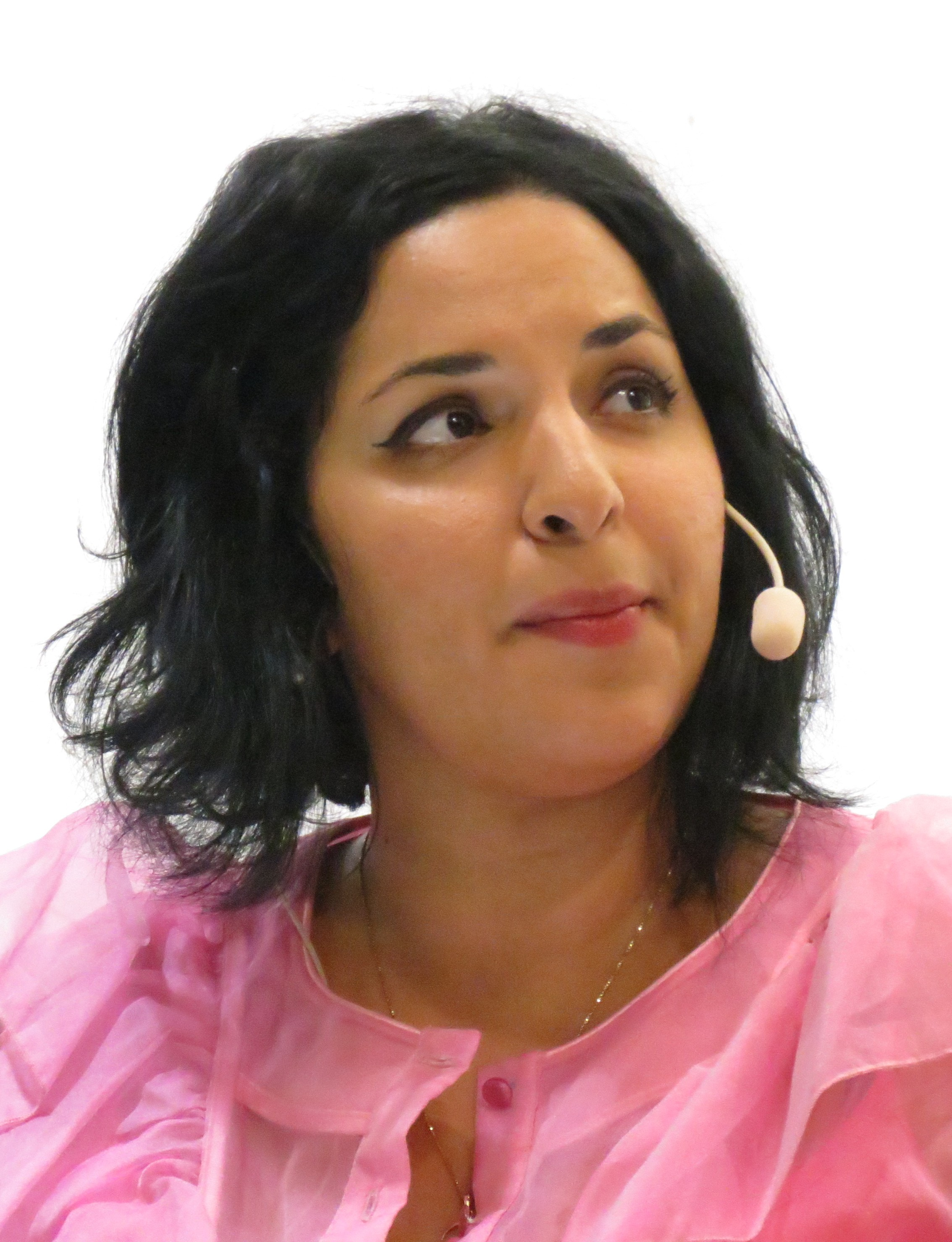
- Moshizi at the 2014 Gothenburg Book Fair
- Born: Tara Khosravi Moshizi; 23 August 1983 (age 42); Tehran, Iran

Tara Khosravi Moshizi (born 23 August 1983) is a Swedish radio presenter and journalist within culture. She has studied journalism at Skurups folkhögskola.

Moshizi has worked at Sveriges Radio and has presented shows like Frank and P3 Populär. She has been part of an entertainment panel as a guest on SVT on the morning show Gomorron Sverige. She is also a film and book reviewer for SVT's evening show Gokväll. She has been an entertainment and cultural editor for the paper Citys editions in Malmö and Lund.

Moshizi has been a reporter for the newspaper Expressen, and the magazines Bon and Elle. Since 2012, she has worked for Aftonbladet, where she is part of the music department and focuses on soul, r'n'b and electronica.

Moshizi is also a DJ and has worked for night clubs at Debaser in Malmö and Stockholm.
