= Elin Brandell =

Swedish journalist and author (1882–1963)

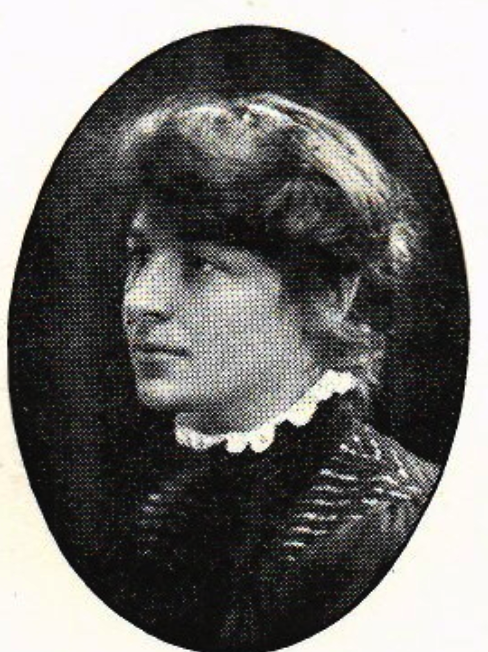
- Born: 14 August 1882; Jewish Community of Stockholm
- Died: 27 June 1963 (aged 80); Täby parish
- Occupation: Journalist
- Spouse(s): Simon Brandell Jr.

Elin Brandell (14 August 1882 – 27 June 1963), was a Swedish journalist and author. As a journalist, she was known under her signatures Opolitiska frun (Mrs Apolitical), Regan and Clementine.

== Biography ==
Elin Brandell was the daughter of professor Pontus Henriques and married in 1908 to journalist Simon Brandell. She was employed at Dagens Nyheter in 1906–1937. Elin Brandell belonged to a club called Ligan ('The Gang') of female journalists including Elin Wägner, Gerda Marcus, Ester Blenda Nordström, Ellen Rydelius, Ellen Landquist, Agnes Lindhagen, Tora Bonnier and Célie Brunius. In 1912, she became the first woman to be given a foreign travel scholarship by Publicistklubben.

Brandell belonged to the elite of the Swedish press during her career and was well known celebrity. Her style is described as neutral but witty and intellectual. She is foremost known as Opolitiska frun ('Mrs Apolitical'), the signature under which she covered the debates in parliament from the gallery of the Riksdag. The MP Ivar Anderson recalled how it was regarded as a distinction for an MP to be portrayed by her:

"When I was elected to the Riksdag I was made aware of Elin Brandell, Mrs Apolitical of the Dagens Nyheter, who had her customary seat at the gallery. I admired her elegant style, her ability to observe and her wit. Einar Rosenborg of DN accompanied her at least during the greater debates. I think it was above all he who encouraged Elin Brandell and advised her in her Riksdag Causeries. She did not actually engage in any political comments but had her strength in the skillful descriptions of the atmosphere and her quick, witty and often rather ambushing personality analysis. She was quite a celebrity and one could see how the gentlemen of the chamber glanced longingly toward her as a mention by Mrs Apolitical was a distinction, whether she delivered appreciation or criticism. I was myself once or twice given the honor, but I can only recall the occasion when she ironically let me know that I was as neat as the breast pin of a scarf."
