= Kristina Hedberg =

Swedish journalist and television presenter

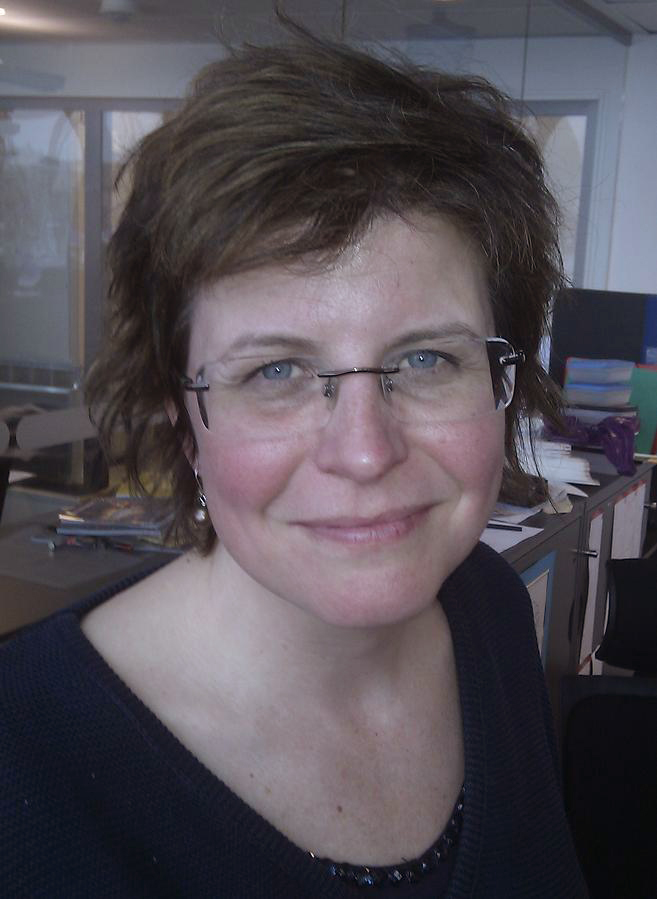
- Hedberg in 2012
- Born: Astrid Emma Olsson Hedberg; 4 March 1970 (age 56); Gothenburg, Sweden
- Occupations: Presenter, journalist
- Employer: Sveriges Television

Astrid Emma Kristina Olsson Hedberg (born 4 March 1970) is a Swedish journalist and television presenter. She has mostly worked as a radiojournalist for Sveriges Radio, where she worked for the news shows Dagens Eko, Ekots lördagsintervju and the investigative show Kaliber. She has also been a television presenter for SVT, with Uppdrag Granskning and the interview show Min sanning. Since 2013, she has been the presenter of the debate show Debatt, where she replaced Belinda Olsson. Hedberg is married to sports journalist Christian Olsson and is the daughter of professor Bo Hedberg.
