= Isobel Hadley-Kamptz =

Swedish journalist and author (born 1976)

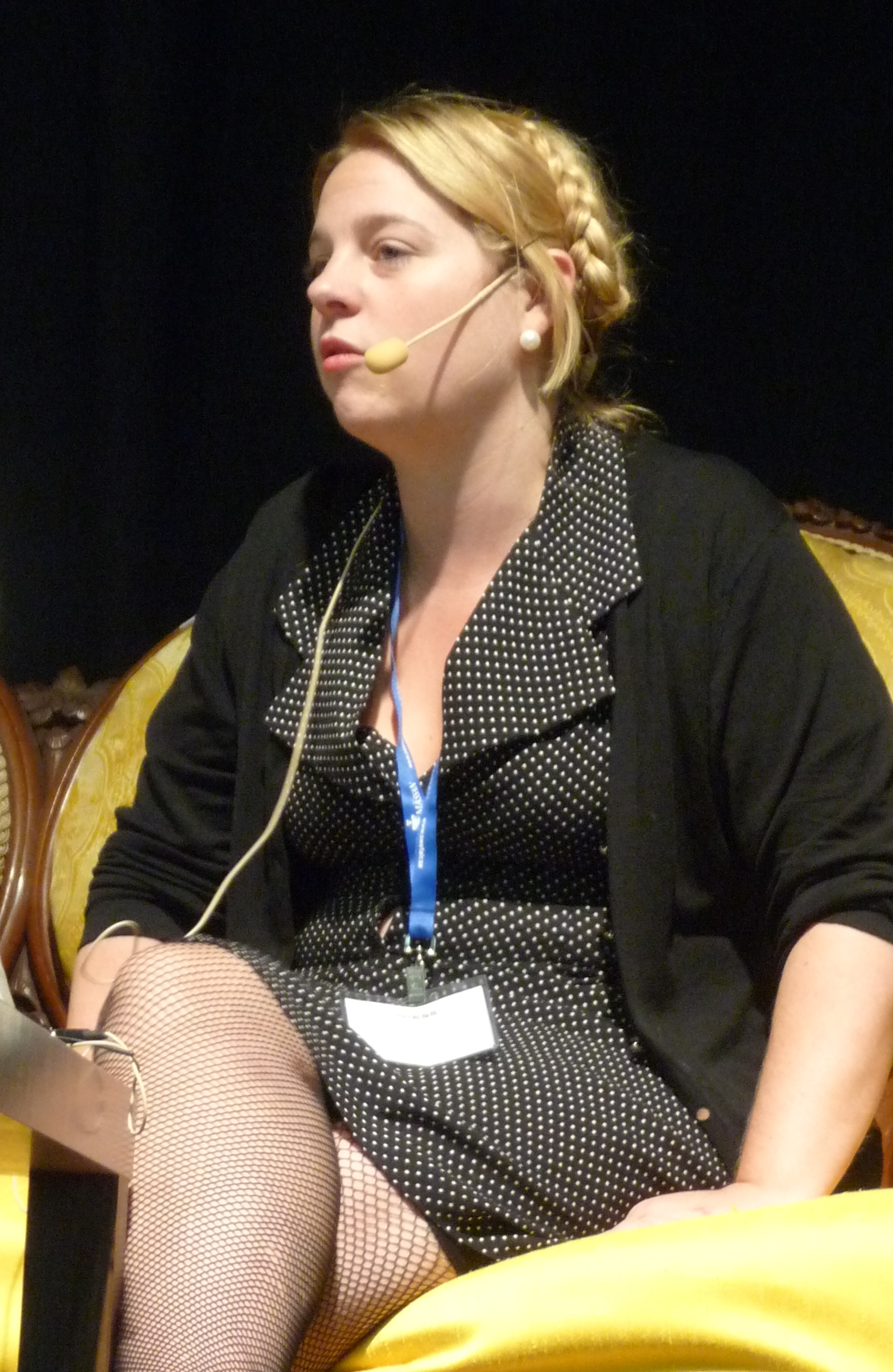
Isobel Hadley-Kamptz in 2009

Isobel Veronica Marie Hadley-Kamptz (born 21 July 1976) is a Swedish journalist and author.

She writes columns for Dalarnas Tidningar, has participated in the TV8 show Studio Virtanen as a panel member for some episodes, and has published two books: the novel Jag går bara ut en stund (2007) and the essay book Frihet och fruktan: Tankar om en ny liberalism (2011).

== Bibliography ==
- Jag går bara ut en stund (2007)
- Frihet och fruktan: Tankar om en ny liberalism (2011)
