= Milène Larsson =

Swedish journalist, producer

- Born: Stockholm, Sweden
- Occupations: Executive producer at BBC, previously Head of Video at VICE and VICE World News, and journalist, producer, and European Managing Editor of Vice Magazine
- Employer(s): Vice Media, BBC
- Known for: Reporter at Vice and Vice News

Milène Larsson is a Royal Television Society award-winning and Emmy-nominated executive producer and commissioning editor of current affairs, investigative and factual documentaries.

Milène Larsson spent 19 years at VICE, initially as a journalist then managing editor, before moving into film production and on-screen reporting in 2008, producing and presenting some of VICE's first ever films. In 2013, she was at the core of the launch team for VICE News, which quickly became the most popular news channel for young people globally. As a producer / director and video journalist, she made more than 50 documentaries and long form news reports from more than 20 countries. This includes the award-winning series Europe or Die, the documentaries Young and Gay in Putin's Russia, Istanbul Rising, The Sahara's Forgotten War, Young Brides for Sale, Raised Without Gender and China's Last Matriarchy, to name a few. Between 2017 and 2023, she led VICE's video production in the UK, EMEA (Europe and North Africa) and APAC (Asia Pacific), commissioning and/or executive producing some of the highest performing films and series in VICE's history, including High Society, the Broadcast Award-winning and Emmy-nominated The Dangerous Rise of Andrew Tate, and the investigative TV series Criminal Planet.

Larsson is currently Executive Producer for BBC Eye, working across international long-form investigations, such as the RTS Award-winning Death in Dubai.

== Early life and career ==
Larsson was born in Stockholm, Sweden. Before joining Vice when it launched in Sweden in 2004, she played guitar in an all-girl punk rock band, started DJing, studied graphic design, and worked for the nightlife guide Nöjesguiden. While working for Vice, she has covered topics including FEMEN, Gezi Park protests, the Western Sahara conflict, and the Russian LGBT propaganda law

== See also ==
- Vice News
- Vice Media
