= Anna Lindmarker =

Swedish journalist and news presenter

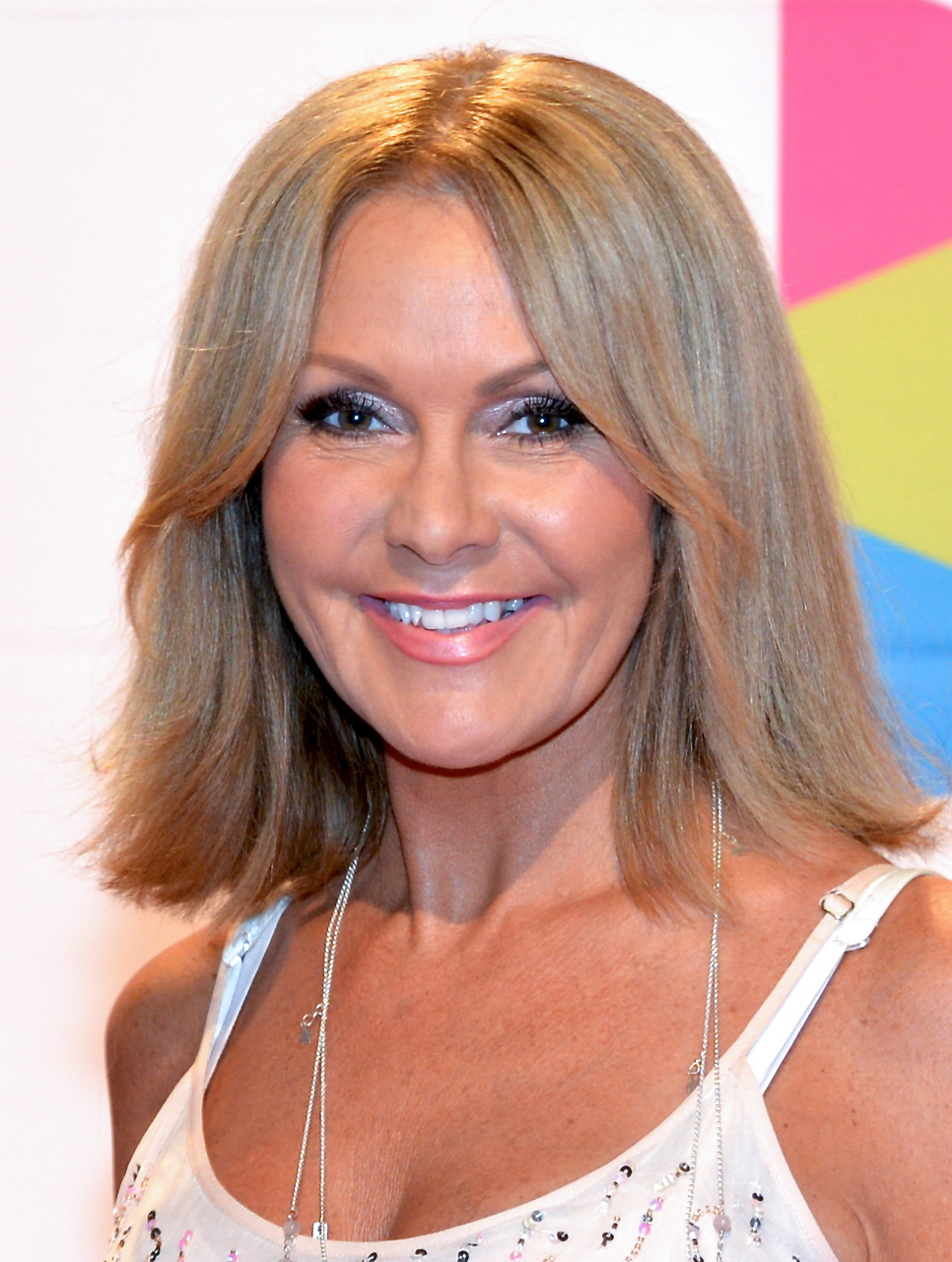
- Lindmarker in 2013
- Born: 5 January 1961 (age 65); Stockholm, Sweden
- Occupations: News presenter, journalist

Anna Lindmarker (born 5 January 1961) is a Swedish journalist and former news presenter at the TV4 news broadcast Nyheterna. She is the daughter of foreign correspondence Ingmar Lindmarker, and during her upbringing she lived with her family in cities like Moscow, New York and Washington DC. During her high school years she started to freelance as a journalist, and then started studying journalism at Poppius journalistskola. After working at several local radio stations, she started to work at Sveriges Radio at the news show Ekot.

During 1989, she started to work as a news presenter for Aktuellt which was broadcast on SVT. In 1997, she started working for TV4 as a news presenter instead for their news broadcast Nyheterna.

On 16 November 2023, Lindmarker announced her retirement from TV4 at the end of the year.
