= Hjalmar Ekdal =

Swedish footballer (born 1998)

- Ekdal with Sweden in 2026

Personal information
- Full name: Hjalmar Ekdal
- Date of birth: 21 October 1998 (age 28)
- Place of birth: Stockholm, Sweden
- Height: 1.87 m (6 ft 2 in)
- Position: Centre-back

Team information
- Current team: Burnley
- Number: 18

Youth career
- –2017: IF Brommapojkarna

College career
| Years | Team | Apps | (Gls) |
| 2017 | UNC Wilmington Seahawks | 20 | (2) |

Senior career*
| Years | Team | Apps | (Gls) |
| 2018–2019 | IK Frej | 30 | (3) |
| 2018 | → Assyriska FF (loan) | 1 | (0) |
| 2019–2020 | Hammarby IF | 0 | (0) |
| 2019 | → IK Frej (loan) | 15 | (0) |
| 2020 | → IK Sirius (loan) | 26 | (0) |
| 2021–2023 | Djurgårdens IF | 50 | (7) |
| 2023– | Burnley | 45 | (1) |
| 2025 | → Groningen (loan) | 14 | (0) |

International career^{‡}
| 2018 | Sweden U19 | 2 | (0) |
| 2020 | Sweden U21 | 1 | (0) |
| 2022– | Sweden | 14 | (0) |
- * Club domestic league appearances and goals as of 09:37, 8 November 2026 (UTC) ‡ National team caps and goals as of 22:50, 25 September 2026 (UTC)

Hjalmar Ekdal (Swedish: [ˈjǎlmar ˈêːkdɑːl]; born 21 October 1998) is a Swedish professional footballer who plays as a centre-back for EFL Championship club Burnley and the Sweden national team. He is the younger brother of former footballer Albin Ekdal.

Beginning his professional career with IK Frej in 2018, Ekdal briefly represented Assyriska FF, Hammarby IF, and IK Sirius before signing with Djurgårdens IF in 2021. He signed for Burnley in 2023.

== Club career ==
=== Early career ===
Ekdal was born in Stockholm and started to play football with IF Brommapojkarna as a youngster. In 2017, he left to club to study in the United States and play college soccer for UNC Wilmington Seahawks. While in the US, he played in 20 games and scored two goals as the Seahawks reached the final of the 2017 CAA Men's Soccer Tournament before losing 4–2 to William & Mary Tribe.

=== IK Frej ===
In May 2018, Ekdal returned to his native country and signed a two-year deal with IK Frej in Superettan, Sweden's second tier. He played 15 league games throughout the year, scoring once, as the club finished 9th in the table. Ekdal also made one appearance out on loan with Assyriska FF in Division 1, the third tier.

In 2019, Ekdal had a major breakthrough and established himself in the starting eleven at IK Frej. He played all 30 league games in Superettan during the season, scoring twice, but was unable to save the club from relegation.

=== Hammarby IF ===
On 19 July 2019, Ekdal transferred to Hammarby IF in Allsvenskan, signing a two-year deal. It was also announced that he would remain eligible for affiliated club IK Frej for the rest of the season. On 3 March 2020, Ekdal was sent on loan to fellow Allsvenskan club IK Sirius for the remainder of the season.

=== Djurgårdens IF ===
On 4 January 2021, Ekdal joined Djurgårdens IF on a four-year contract. He was named the Allsvenskan player of the month for the month of September 2021.

=== Burnley ===
On 21 January 2023, Ekdal moved to England and joined Championship leaders Burnley on a four-and-a-half-year deal for an undisclosed fee. He earned his debut appearance for the Clarets on 4 February in a 3–0 away win against Norwich City in the EFL Championship, in which he scored his first Burnley goal in the 60th minute.

On 23 January 2025, Ekdal joined Eredivisie club Groningen on loan until the end of the season.

== International career ==
=== Youth ===
Ekdal was called up to the Sweden under-19 national team in October 2018, and featured in two friendlies against Denmark (3–1 win) and Russia (1–1 draw) the same month. He was called up to the Sweden U21 team for the first time on 26 August 2020.

=== Senior ===
Ekdal was called up to the Sweden national team for the first time on 1 December 2021, for two friendlies against Finland in January 2022. However, the friendlies were cancelled two weeks later because of the COVID-19 pandemic. Ekdal was once again called up to the national team on 18 May 2022, for Sweden's 2022–23 UEFA Nations League games against Slovenia, Norway, and Serbia in June 2022.

He made his full international debut for Sweden on 9 June 2022 in the UEFA Nations League game against Serbia, playing the full 90 minutes at centre back in a 1–0 loss.

On 12 May 2026, Ekdal was named in the Sweden squad for the 2026 FIFA World Cup.

== Personal life ==
He is the son of television host Lennart Ekdal and the younger brother of retired footballer Albin Ekdal, who previously played in the Allsvenskan, Serie A and Bundesliga, as well as representing the Sweden national team at senior level from 2011 to 2023.

== Career statistics ==
=== Club ===
As of match played 7 November 2026

Appearances and goals by club, season and competition
| Club | Season | League | | | National cup (Note: Includes Svenska Cupen, FA Cup) | | League cup (Note: Includes EFL Cup) | | Europe | | Other | | Total | |
| Club | Season | Division | Apps | Goals | Apps | Goals | Apps | Goals | Apps | Goals | Apps | Goals | Apps | Goals |
|---|---|---|---|---|---|---|---|---|---|---|---|---|---|---|
| IF Brommapojkarna | 2017 | Superettan | 0 | 0 | 0 | 0 | — | | — | | — | | 0 | 0 |
| IK Frej | 2018 | Superettan | 15 | 1 | 4 | 2 | — | | — | | — | | 19 | 3 |
| IK Frej | 2019 | Superettan | 30 | 2 | — | | — | | — | | 2 (Note: Appearances in Superettan promotion play-offs) | 0 | 32 | 2 |
| IK Frej | Total | | 45 | 3 | 4 | 2 | — | | — | | 2 | 0 | 51 | 5 |
| Assyriska FF (loan) | 2018 | Ettan Fotboll | 1 | 0 | — | | — | | — | | — | | 1 | 0 |
| Hammarby IF | 2019 | Allsvenskan | 0 | 0 | 0 | 0 | — | | — | | — | | 0 | 0 |
| IK Sirius (loan) | 2020 | Allsvenskan | 26 | 0 | 1 | 0 | — | | — | | — | | 27 | 0 |
| Djurgårdens IF | 2021 | Allsvenskan | 26 | 4 | 6 | 2 | — | | — | | — | | 32 | 6 |
| Djurgårdens IF | 2022 | Allsvenskan | 24 | 3 | 6 | 0 | — | | 11 (Note: Appearances in UEFA Europa Conference League) | 1 | — | | 41 | 4 |
| Djurgårdens IF | Total | | 50 | 7 | 12 | 2 | — | | 11 | 1 | 0 | 0 | 73 | 10 |
| Burnley | 2022–23 | Championship | 9 | 1 | 0 | 0 | — | | — | | — | | 9 | 1 |
| Burnley | 2023–24 | Premier League | 8 | 0 | 0 | 0 | 1 | 0 | — | | — | | 9 | 0 |
| Burnley | 2024–25 | Championship | 0 | 0 | 1 | 0 | 0 | 0 | — | | — | | 1 | 0 |
| Burnley | 2025–26 | Premier League | 19 | 0 | 2 | 0 | 0 | 0 | — | | — | | 21 | 0 |
| Burnley | 2026–27 | Championship | 9 | 0 | 0 | 0 | 1 | 0 | — | | — | | 10 | 0 |
| Burnley | Total | | 45 | 1 | 3 | 0 | 2 | 0 | — | | — | | 50 | 1 |
| Groningen (loan) | 2024–25 | Eredivisie | 14 | 0 | — | | — | | — | | — | | 14 | 0 |
| Career total | | | 181 | 11 | 20 | 4 | 2 | 0 | 11 | 1 | 2 | 0 | 216 | 16 |

=== International ===
As of match played 25 September 2026

Appearances and goals by national team and year
| National team | Year | Apps | Goals |
|---|---|---|---|
| Sweden | 2022 | 2 | 0 |
| Sweden | 2023 | 4 | 0 |
| Sweden | 2024 | 1 | 0 |
| Sweden | 2025 | 4 | 0 |
| Sweden | 2026 | 3 | 0 |
| Total | | 14 | 0 |

== Honours ==
Individual

- Colonial Athletic Association's Men's Soccer – Rookie of the Year: 2017
- Colonial Athletic Association's Men's Soccer – All-Rookie Team: 2017
- All-Colonial Athletic Association – First Team: 2017
- NCCSIA University Division All-State Men's Soccer – First Team: 2017
- Colonial Athletic Association Men's Soccer – Player of the Week: 28 August–3 September 2017
- Allsvenskan Player of the month: September 2021
- Allsvenskan Defender of the year: 2021
