= Madeleine Pousette =

Swedish journalist

Ester Madeleine Hovell, née Pousette (born 22 July 1943) is a Swedish journalist.

Beside being a journalist, she has also published several books. She is the author of De glömda barnen (1996), Sveriges skolledarförbund 40 år: 1966–2006 (2006), Trygg på jobbet – så förebygger och hanterar du hot, våld och trakasserier mot skolans personal (2009) and Våga fråga, våga lyssna, våga agera! (2011). The latter of these deals with children whose parents overconsume alcohol.

== Biography ==
Madeleine Pousette was born on 22 July 1943 in Engelbrekt parish in Stockholm. She is the daughter of the engineer Carl-Gustaf Pousette and Margareta, née Sjögren. After graduating in 1963, she attended the Frans Schartaus Handelsinstitut, where she graduated in 1965, and the School of Journalism, where she graduated in 1967. In 1975, she also pursued academic studies at Stockholm University.

She was employed at Expressen from 1968 to 1970, at Vingresor in Bulgaria and Austria from 1970 to 1971, worked at Håll Sverige Rent from 1972 to 1974, at the Association for non-toxic foods (Föreningen för giftfria livsmedel), and at Miljötidningen from 1975 to 1980. In 1980, she became ansvarig utgivare of the magazine Förskolan. In the 1980s, she was chairman of the Ulla-Britta Bruuns Memorial Fund.

Pousette later became editor-in-chief of Kommunaktuellt. When Kommunaktuellt merged with Landstingsvärlden to form Dagens Samhälle in 2003, she was the newspaper's first editor-in-chief. In 2005, she switched to freelance activities.

Madeleine Pousette has been married since 1976 to Investigative Secretary Lars Hovell (born 1948), son of Bureau Chief Bengt Hovell and social secretary Ulla-Britt Hovell.
