= Malcolm Dixelius =

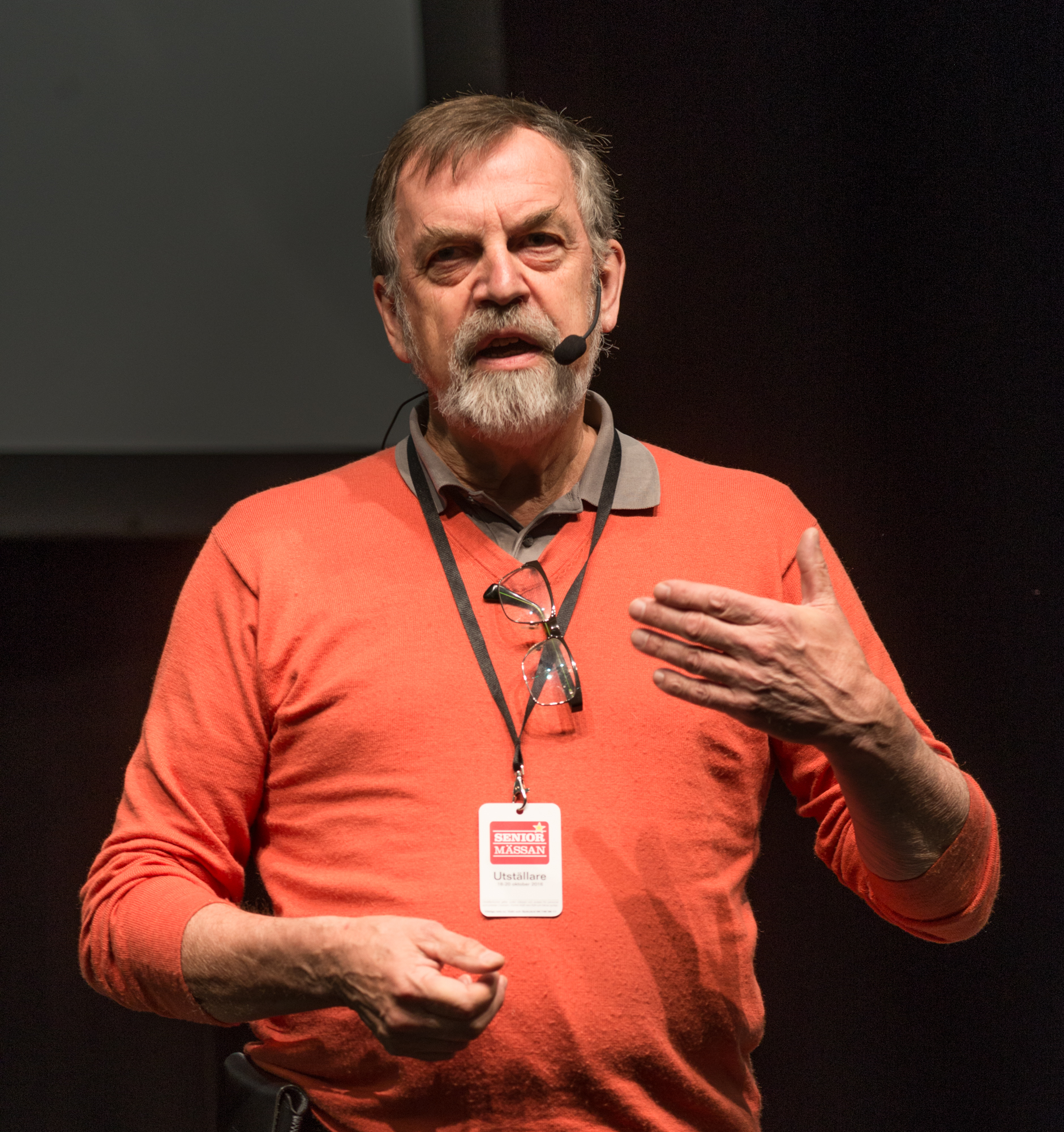
Malcolm Dixelius in Älvsjö 2016.

Johan Malcolm Dixelius (born 23 April 1948 in Frösö, Sweden) is a Swedish journalist, documentary filmmaker and commentator on Russian and Soviet affairs. He is known for his work as a Moscow correspondent for Swedish public broadcasting and later as a producer and director of documentary films.

== Early life and education ==
Dixelius grew up in the city of Sundsvall in northern Sweden. In his teens, he attended Atlantic College in Wales. In 1968–69, he acquired basic Russian during his military service at the Army Interpreter School (Tolkskolan) and subsequently studied Russian and English at Uppsala University. He also studied journalism at the University of Georgia in the United States and completed his formal training at the Gothenburg Institute of Journalism (Journalisthögskolan) in 1972.

== Journalism career ==
Dixelius began his journalism career in 1972 as a reporter for regional public service stations, first in Gothenburg ''Västnytt'' and later in Sundsvall ''Mittnytt''. From 1979 to 1984 he served as a Moscow correspondent for Sweden's national public service broadcaster Sveriges Radio (SR) and Sveriges Television (SVT), returning to Moscow in 1990 to work exclusively for the SVT Aktuellt programme until leaving SVT in 1993.

As an independent journalist he continued covering political and social developments in Russia and the post-Soviet region. Since Russia's full-scale invasion of Ukraine in 2022, he has been a regular commentator on Russian affairs for TV4.

== Documentary filmmaking ==
In 1993 Dixelius moved from broadcast journalism into documentary filmmaking and founded a production company, Dixit International.

His documentary work examines Russian society, politics, sport, and Arctic expeditions. Notable productions include:

- Russian Mafia (1994), exploring organised crime networks in post-Soviet Russia, and '''CCCP Hockey''' (2004), examining the Soviet national ice hockey programme.
- The Laser Man Documentary (2005), co-directed with journalist Gellert Tamas, based on Tamas's prison interviews with John Ausonius, who shot eleven people in the Stockholm area in 1991–92. It won the 2006 Kristallen award for Documentary of the Year.
- A Bitter Taste of Freedom (2011), directed by Marina Goldovskaya and executive-produced by Dixelius, centred on Russian journalist Anna Politkovskaya, an investigative reporter for Novaya Gazeta who was shot dead in her Moscow apartment building on 7 October 2006 after years of reporting on the Chechen conflict.
- The Eukrainian (2025), directed by Viktor Nordenskiöld and co-produced by Dixelius through Dixit International, about Ukraine's accession to the European Union as seen through Deputy Prime Minister Olha Stefanishyna.
- Ice Grave (2025), directed by Robin Hunzinger and co-produced by Dixelius through Dixit International, about the 1897 Andrée Arctic expedition.

== Writing ==
Together with Russian journalist and writer Andrei Konstantinov founder of the Agency for Investigative Journalism in St Petersburg and a chronicler of post-Soviet organised crime Dixelius co-authored two books:

- Dixelius, Malcolm; Konstantinov, Andrej (1994). ''Rysslands undre värld'' Russia's Underworld. Stockholm: T. Fischer & Co. 245 pp.ISBN 9789170547232
- Dixelius, Malcolm; Konstantinov, Andrej (1998). ''Maffians Ryssland'' Mafialand Russia. Stockholm: Kommentus. 394 pp.ISBN 978-91-7345-084-3
