= Reidar Carlsson =

Swedish journalist and politician

Reidar Carlsson (born 1957) is a Swedish journalist and politician. He is a member of the Centre Party.
