= Magnus Falkehed =

Swedish journalist

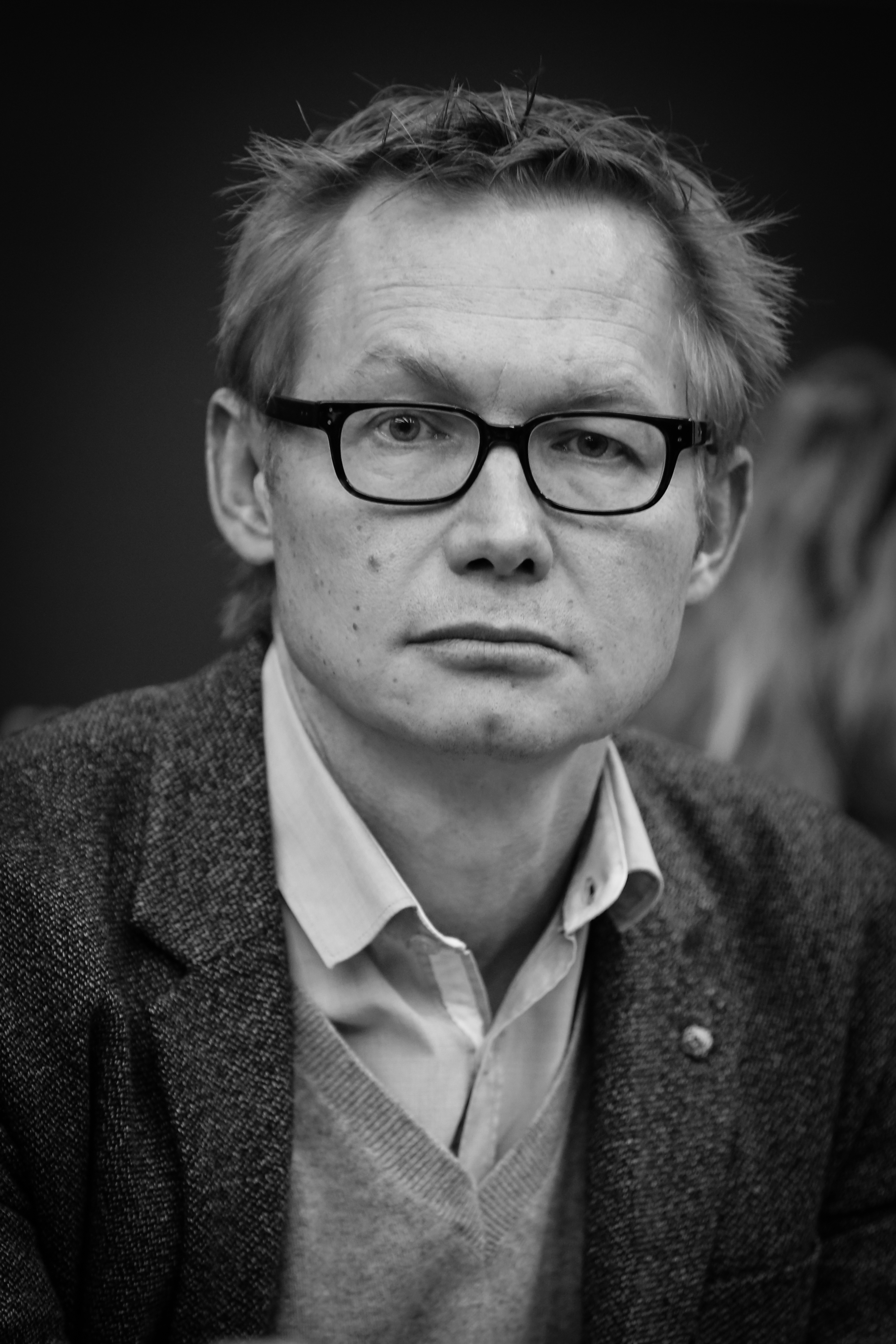
- Falkehed in 2014
- Born: 30 September 1967 (age 58); Huddinge, Sweden
- Occupation: Journalist

Magnus Falkehed (born 30 September 1967) is a Swedish journalist. He has been a correspondent for Dagens Nyheter in Paris, France, since 2011. He has also reported from Northern Africa and the Middle East. He has written for other newspapers, like Göteborgs-Posten, Sydsvenskan, Dagens Industri, and Fokus. He published the report and analysis book, Le Modèle suédois – ce qui attend la France with his French publisher, Payot, in 2005. As well as the recipe book Fransk afton – maten, musiken, bistroerna, Paris in 2010 by publishers Norsteadt förlag.

Magnus Falkehed and the photographer Niclas Hammarström were captured in the city of Yabroud in Syria on 23 November 2013, after a week of doing news work there, by Syrian rebels. On 8 January 2014, the foreign departments announced that Falkehed and Hammarström had been released. Despite their captivity, they got one report out from the conflict zone; it was published in the next coming week on both Dagens Nyheter and Aftonbladet. In March 2015, the book Idag ska vi inte dö – Fångar i krigets Syrien was published about his time as a captive.
