= Stefan Wahlberg =

Swedish television producer

- Born: 1966

Stefan Wahlberg (born 1966 in Stockholm) is a Swedish television producer, journalist and columnist. Wahlberg started his career as a journalist 1986 and was early specialized in issues related to law and order, criminology and constitutional importance. Nevertheless, as a professional, he has been deeply involved in a wider range of issues related to politics, history and culture.

Newspapers/magazines: Wahlberg has been the head of the crime-desk at the national newspaper Expressen and the editor-in-chief for the weekly news- and business magazine Résumé. Today he is a senior columnist in the national newspaper Metro and the business magazine Medievärlden.

Television/Radio: Wahlberg has been the producer of several TV series, documentaries and current-affairs-shows on national TV. E.g.: Aschberg & Co, Efterlyst, Godnatt Sverige, Jakten på en mördare, Kontrollkommissionen, Middag med Bildt, Ondska, Rättens tjänare and Svenska mord. His TV series have been hosted by several of the most popular TV-personalities and celebrities in Sweden. E.g.: Hasse Aro, Robert Aschberg, Carl Bildt (former prime minister of Sweden) and Kristian Luuk. In addition to that Wahlberg has written about twenty radio chronicles for national radio based on historical Swedish murder investigations.

For many years Wahlberg has been a donor and member of the politically unbiased Expo Foundation; a non-profit privately owned research foundation with the aim of studying and mapping anti-democratic extremist and racist tendencies in society. Wahlberg has also, successfully, brought several lawsuits against the community about constitutional questions and other matters of principle.
