= Max Collie =

Australian Dixieland trombonist

John Maxwell Collie (21 February 1931 – 6 January 2018) was an Australian trombonist who played Dixieland jazz. Born in Melbourne, Australia, he played with several different jazz bands before forming his own group, Max Collie's Rhythm Aces, in February 1966. They released their first record in 1971 and, in 1975, won a world championship in traditional jazz against 14 North American jazz bands.

Collie died on 6 January 2018, at the age of 86.
