= Marie Lehmann (journalist) =

Swedish sports journalist

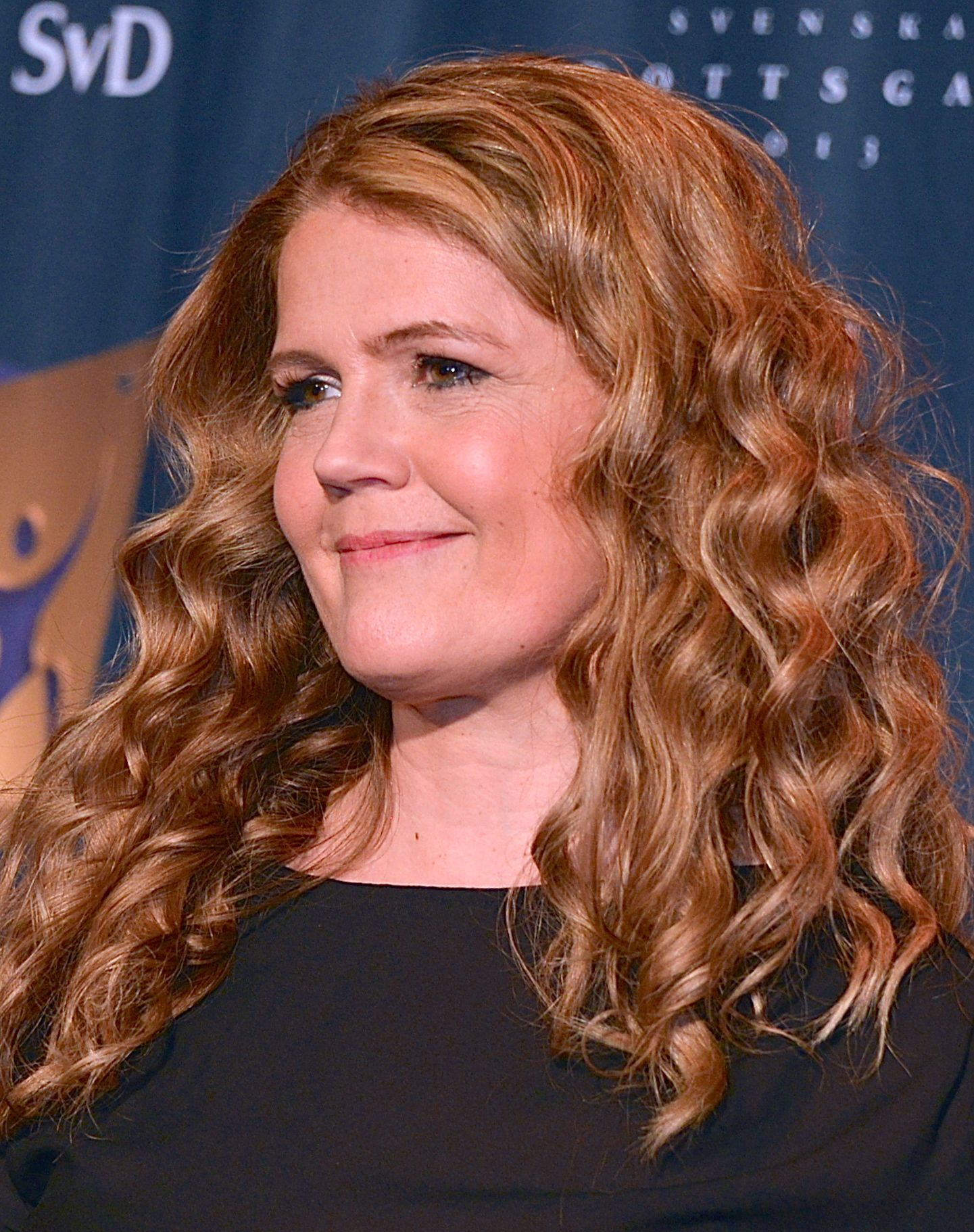
- Marie Lehmann in 2013
- Born: Marie Margareta Bergqvist; 14 March 1965 (age 61); Tyresö, Sweden
- Occupation: journalist

Marie Margareta Lehmann (born Bergqvist, 14 March 1965 in Tyresö, Sweden) is a Swedish sports journalist and television host. Lehmann has worked at Sveriges Television (SVT) since the early 1990s hosting shows like Lilla Sportspegeln and Gomorron Sverige.

Lehmann is married to retired ice hockey player Tommy Lehmann since 1988.
