= Johan Jenny Ehrenberg =

Swedish author, journalist and entrepreneur

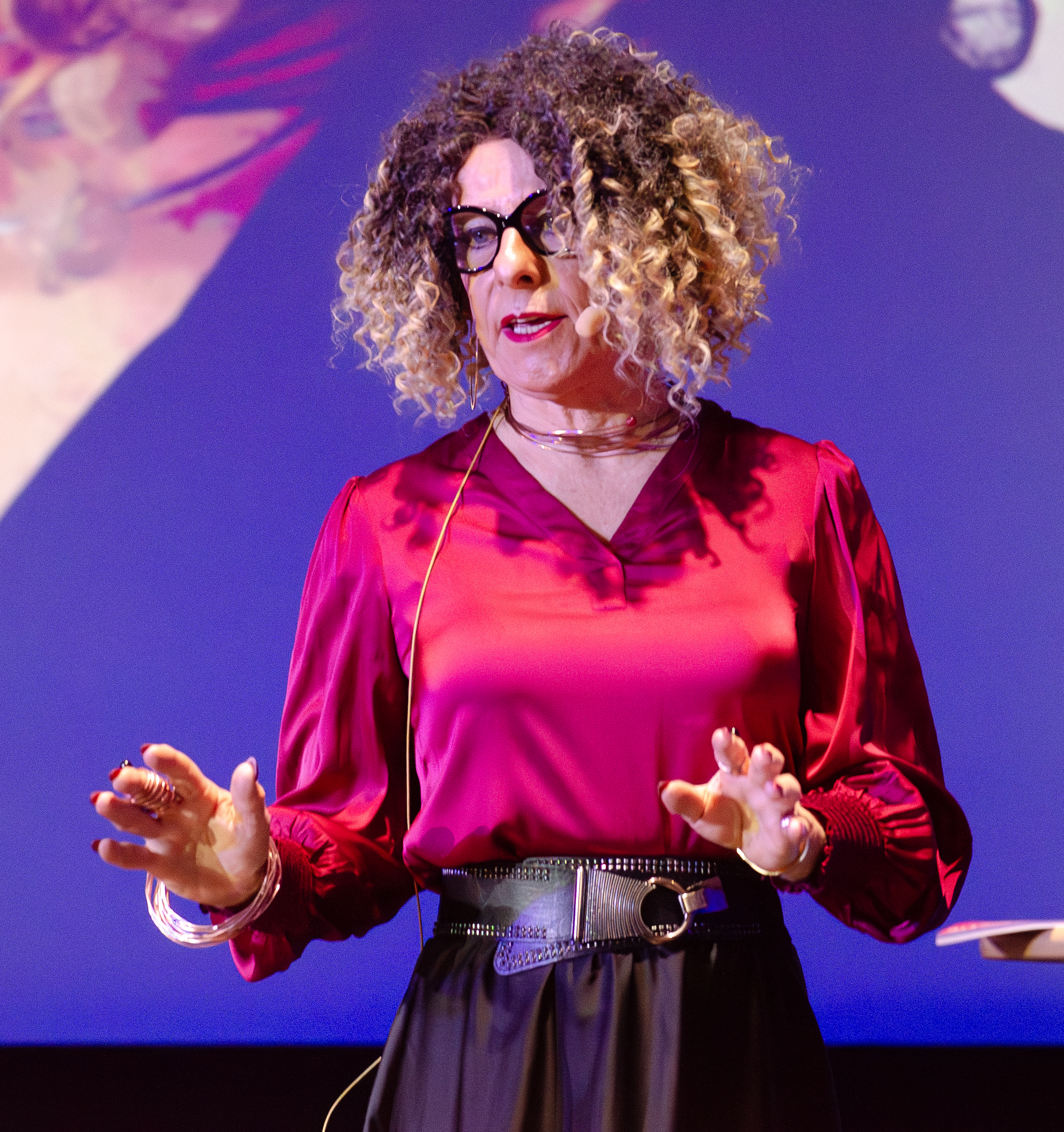
- Ehrenberg speaking at SocForum in 2024
- Born: Johan Ehrenberg; July 14, 1957 (age 68); Linköping
- Occupation: Journalist

Johan Jenny Ehrenberg (born 14 July 1957) is a Swedish author, journalist and entrepreneur. They are also managing director for ETC Utveckling, a company which produces the left-leaning magazine ETC. As a publisher they are associated with green- and feminist-oriented socialism and have written several books which criticize the growth-oriented capitalistic society, as well as globalisation and the banking industry.

In 1983, ETC published a story about Ehrenberg's gender transition to Jenny Ehrenberg, which received much attention. When it turned out that Ehrenberg had just dressed as a woman for 6 months to explore the role of gender in society, but had not gone through any surgical procedure or legal change of sex, other Swedish media and in particular the tabloids portrayed Ehrenberg and their story as a "fake". Ehrenberg came out as transgender again in 2023. They do not identify as a man or a woman, but simply as trans and third gender.

== Bibliography ==
- Bara lite kärlek
- Löjliga familjen
- Pengar, makt och alla vi andra
- Mera pengar
- Globaliseringsmyten
- Socialismen, min vän
- Ekonomihandboken (with Sten Ljunggren)
- Stackars oss! : en bok om jättemycket mera demokrati
- Aileme – befrielsens tid
- Sagan om Bonusgrisen och Bläckfisken
- Nya Ekonomihandboken (with Sten Ljunggren)
