= Frida Boisen =

Swedish journalist and author

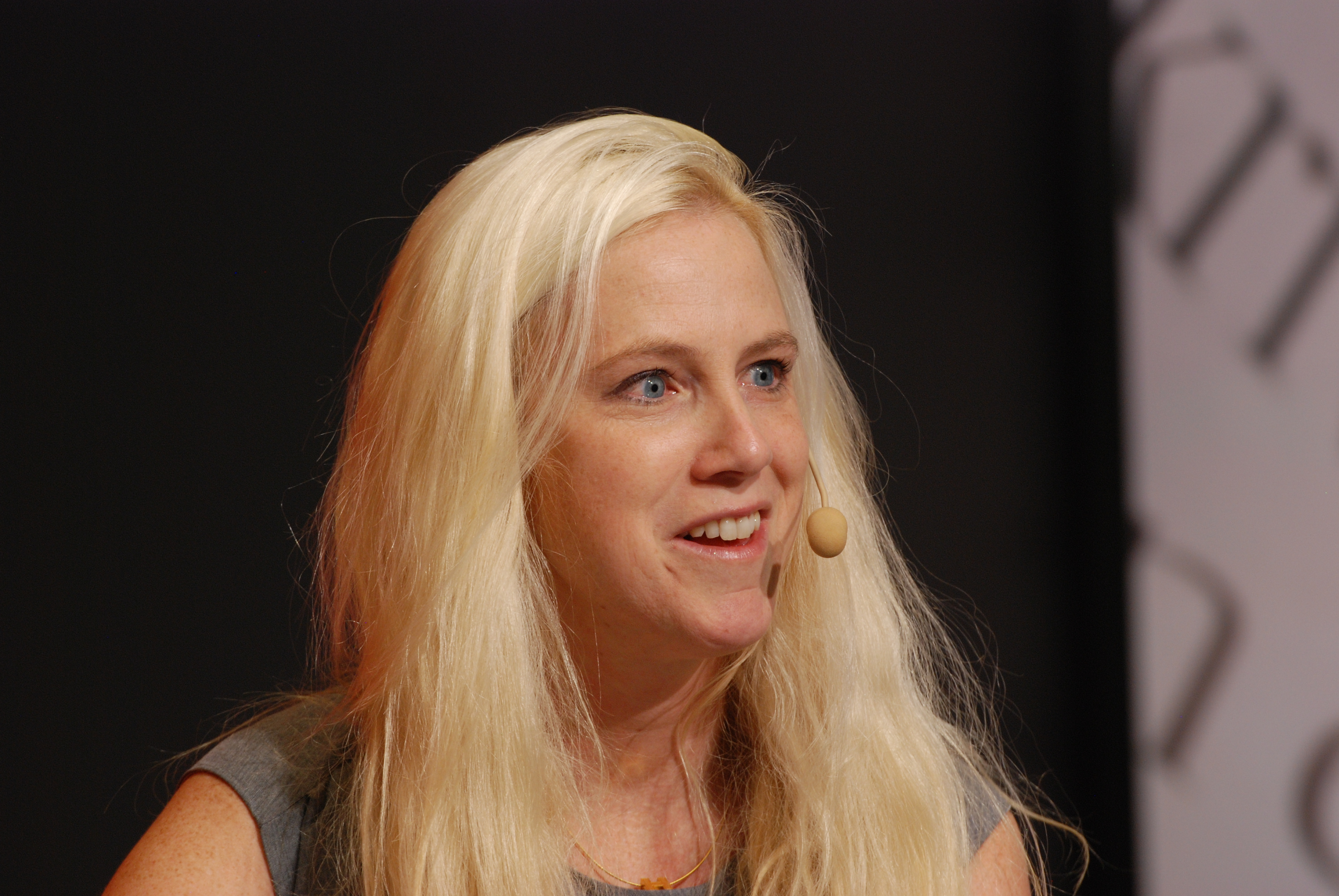
- Frida Boisen
- Born: 25 September 1974 (age 52); Säbrå, Sweden
- Occupation: Journalist

Frida Maria Boisen (born 25 September 1974) is a Swedish journalist and author.

== Early life ==
On 25 September 1974, Boisen was born in Säbrå, Sweden.

Boisen studied journalism at University of Gothenburg.

== Career ==
Boisen is a columnist for the Expressen newspaper. She has previously been the editor-in-chief for Göteborgs-Tidningen. She has also been the social media strategist for Dagens Industri.

In October 2015, Boisen became the digital editor-in-chief for Bonnier Tidskrifer.

In late 2015, her book Digital succé – så lyckas du med sociala medier was published by Bokförlaget Forum. In 2014 she won the award Best use of Social Media på INMA Awards.

Boisen worked at Göteborgs-Posten between 1997 and 2001. In 2001 she was a guest debater, and columnist at Nyhetsmorgon at TV4, the panel at SVT's morning show Gomorron Sverige and TV3's Tillsammans.

In 2006, she became the editor-in-chief of the fashion magazine Plaza Kvinna.

In 2018, Boisen is the author of Digital Passion.
