= Axel Christensen =

American pianist and publisher (1881–1955)

Axel Waldemar Christensen (March 23, 1881 – August 17, 1955) was an American composer, arranger, publisher, pianist and music instructor. He was the founder of the Christensen School of Popular Music, under which he published various instruction books about the playing of syncopated music. The school enrolled upwards of 500,000 students in its numerous branches across the United States, making it one of the first and most successful examples of standardizing the instruction of popular music. The school also published the music magazine 'Christensen Ragtime Review'. His formal attire and preference for grand pianos gave him the vaudeville title 'Czar of Ragtime'.

== Life and career ==
Axel Christensen was born in 1881 in Chicago, Illinois to Danish parents Charles and Mary Christensen. Playing classical music from an early age, he would first delve into the popular ragtime music in his teenage years. He would marry Reine Annette Swanson in 1903, a marriage that would last until his death. They had one child, Carle Christensen, in 1909.

In 1902, Christensen made his first publication, a ragtime arrangement of Felix Mendelssohn's Wedding March. The following year, he opened the Christensen School of Popular Music, one of the earliest and foremost academies of its kind, advertising 'Ragtime Taught in Ten Lessons'. In a 1949 interview with Rudi Blesh and Harriet Janis, he described the genesis of the company:

In 1902 and 1903 there was no accepted method or system of playing ragtime, or syncopated music if you prefer, by people as a whole, either for piano or orchestra. The public got its knowledge of ragtime, for the most part, by listening to trick pianists in vaudeville, or at music halls, and the information they obtained was unsound because at the time no two pianists ever played syncopated numbers alike.

...

It seemed to me that the time was ripe for a method which would overcome the difficulties encountered in individual improvisation...a system which would standardize the fundamentals of syncopation for the piano, and enable all pianists, amateur or professional, to grasp the idea quickly, easily, and inexpensively.

— Axel Christensen, They All Played Ragtime, pages 137-138

His first instruction book, Christensen's Ragtime Instruction Book Number 1, was published in 1906. The first branch of his company outside of Chicago opened up in San Francisco in 1909. Christensen became one of the first pianists to record hand-played piano rolls for QRS Music Technologies, Inc. in 1912.

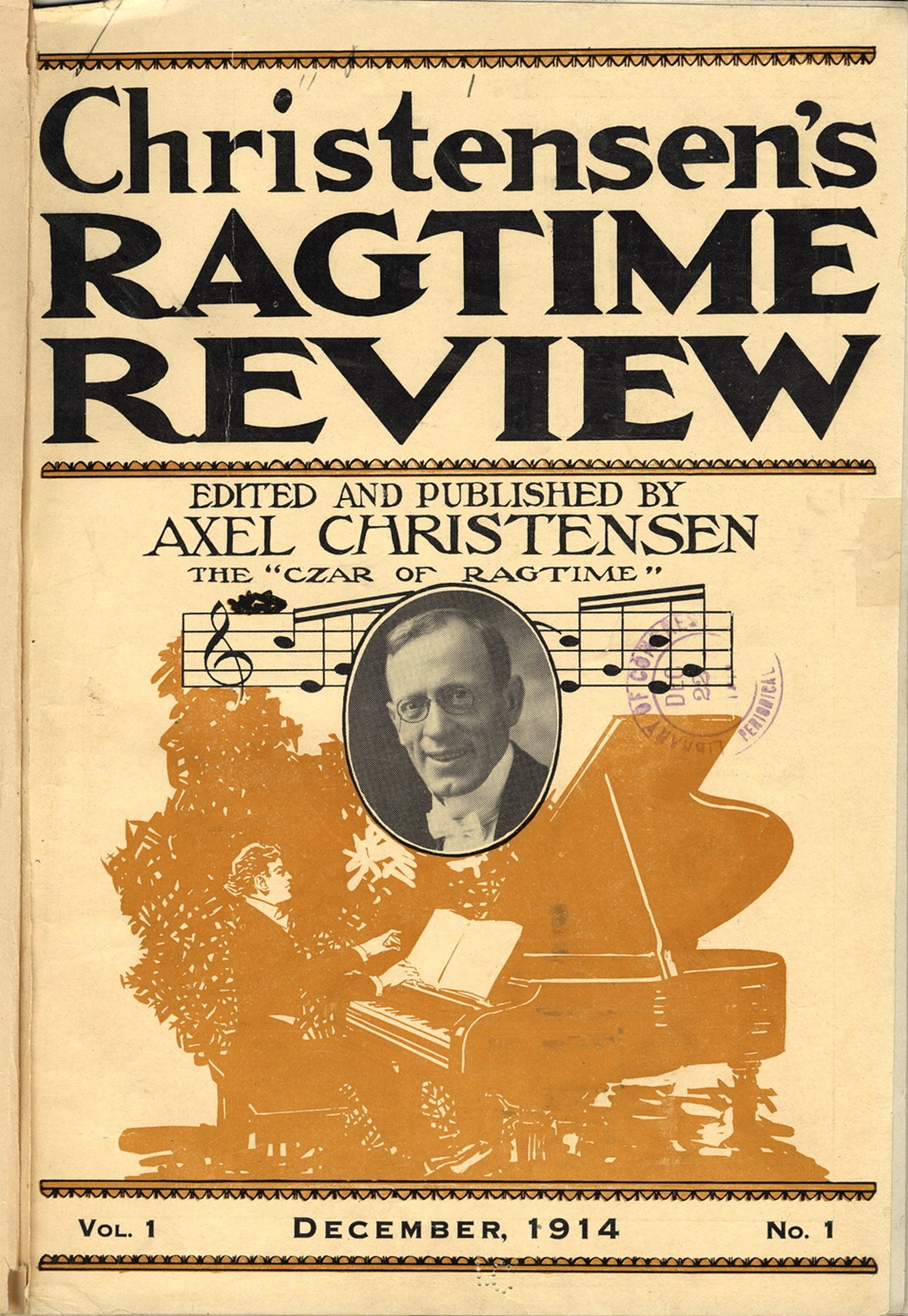
First issue of Christensen Ragtime Review (Christensen shown on cover)

In 1914, the first issue of the Christensen Ragtime Review magazine released; it would run until late 1918. John S. Stark, the foremost publisher of ragtime, contributed some of his firm's publications in this magazine. It also contained articles offering playing advice and anecdotes, as well as collections of self-composed music cues for silent films. It was merged with Walter Jacobs' Melody magazine in 1918.

In the 1920s, Christensen shifted the focus of his instructional material to the now-popular jazz and novelty styles. He also recorded for the labels Okeh and Paramount. This decade would see him touring across the country to play in vaudeville theaters. The outbreak of the Great Depression caused him to downscale his business, closing many of the branches of his school across the nation.

In 1945, the last of his instructional books, 'Axel Christensen's Instruction Book for Modern Swing Music' released.

In 1951, Christensen performed on the television show, 'You're Never Too Old.' He died on August 17, 1955, in Long Beach, California.

== Selected compositions ==
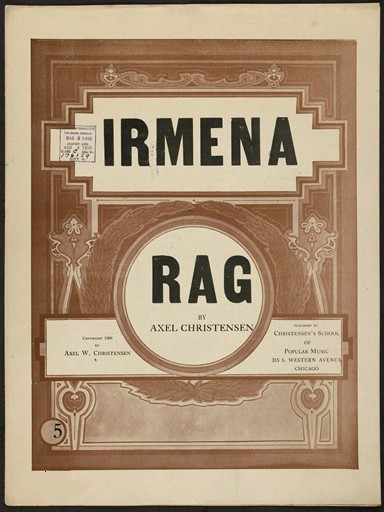
Cover of Irmena Rag (1908)

- Ragtime Wedding March (1902)
- Irmena Rag (1908)
- Cauldron Rag (1909)
- Star and Garter (1910)
- In My Mercer Racing Car (1913)
- The Minnesota Rag (1913)
- Pathetic Rag (1913)
- Webster Grove Rag (1915)
- That Potato Bug Rag (1916)
- Nobody's Business (1923)
- Teasing the Klassics (1923)
- Axel Grease (1924)
- Walking Blues (1924)

== Instruction Books ==
- Christensen's Ragtime Instruction Book No. 1 (6 editions, 1906–1919)
- Christensen's Ragtime Instruction Book No. 2 (2 editions, 1922–1924)
- Instruction Book for Vaudeville Playing Book 1 (1912)
- Instruction Book for Vaudeville Playing Book 2 (1912)
- Instruction Book for Vaudeville Playing Book 3 (1912)
- Instruction Book for Vaudeville Playing Book 4 (1912)
- Instruction Book for Vaudeville Playing Book 5 (1912)
- Axel Christensen's New Instruction Book for Rag and Jazz Piano Playing (2 editions, 1920–1925)
- Christensen's Instruction Book for Playing Rag, Jazz and Popular Music on the Tenor Banjo (1922)
- Axel Christensen's New Instruction Book for Rag, Jazz and Popular Music (1922)
- Axel Christensen's Instruction Book for Jazz and Novelty Piano Playing (2 editions, 1924–1927)
- Axel Christensen's Instruction Book for Modern Music (1931)
- Axel Christensen's Instruction Book for Modern Swing Music (2 editions, 1936–1945)
