= Gerda Marcus =

Swedish journalist and philanthropist (1880–1952)

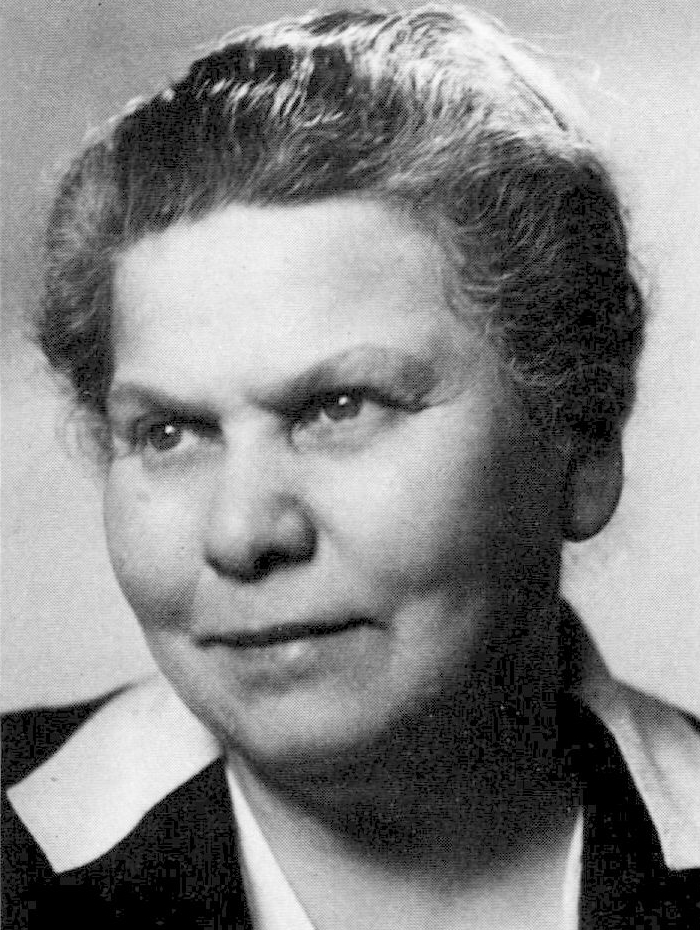
Gerda Marcus

Gerda Fredrika Marcus (1880–1952) was a Swedish journalist and philanthropist who was deeply concerned with social issues. After contributing to Swedish newspapers from Berlin in 1907, she worked for Svenska Dagbladet first in Sweden and later as a foreign correspondent in Vienna where she lived from 1923 to 1933. During the First World War, she proved to be an effective fundraiser for assisting needy families. Marcus was a key figure in the Swedish branch of Save the Children which she helped to establish in 1919, continuing her support during and after the Second World War.

== Biography ==
Born in Stockholm on 21 February 1880, Gerda Fredrika Marcus was the daughter of the wholesaler Jacob Axel Marcus and his wife Emma Henriette née Eliasson. She was one of five children in a Jewish family with ancestors who had emigrated from Mecklenburg in the late 18th century. After attending the Åhlin Girls' School (1889–1897), she worked for Thecla Tjäder's employment agency.

While working in Berlin in 1907, she began to send news reports to Swedish newspapers such as Dagens Nyheter, almost accidentally becoming a foreign correspondent. On returning to Sweden, she spent a couple of years as assistant editor for a newly established theatre journal, Thalia. After it closed in 1913, she joined the editorial staff at Svenska Dagbladet, eventually working in Vienna as the paper's foreign correspondent. Her efforts, however, were not restricted to writing. She proved to be a highly effective fundraiser, using to paper's resources to raise capital for funding needy families. During the difficult years of the First World War, thanks to her writings and support from the newspaper, she was able to raise substantial funding for the elderly to enjoy holidays and for children to take part in games and other organized activities. In 1919, she was one of those who established the Swedish branch of Save the Children, becoming its first Secretary General.

From 1923 to 1933, Marcus lived in Vienna where in December 1923, she married the Jewish lawyer and theatre publisher Ernst Fall. The marriage was dissolved in 1933. From the mid-1930s, she assisted the Jewish congregation in Stockholm to save Jewish children from persecution in Germany. After the end of the Second World War, she visited refugee camps in Austria and Hungary, providing support for children. She was also active in assisting development of the Palestine question.

Gerda Marcus died in Stockholm on 28 January 1952.
