= Anders Pontén =

Swedish author, journalist and actor

Anders Daniel Pontén (16 September 1934 in Skellefteå, Sweden – 12 January 2009 in Örebro, Sweden) was a Swedish author, journalist and actor.

Anders Pontén was the son of the doctor Johan Pontén and Elisabeth, née Hagströmer, as well as nephew to Gustaf Pontén and grandson of John Pontén. The family belonged to the clergyman family Pontén from Småland.

He worked at Stockholms-Tidningen in 1955, Nordvästra Skånes Tidningar in 1956, Nerikes Allehanda in 1958, Aftonbladet in 1960, Expressen in 1964, Sveriges Radio TV in Gothenburg 1967, in Örebro 1969 and at Sveriges Riksradio AB in Örebro from 1980. He was the producer of the radio program Riksronden and various medical- and general historical programs. He was also involved as an actor in Örebro länsteater and TV-teatern and has his own tour guide recording at Örebro slott.

During the 1970s and 1980s, Pontén worked with the radio program Riksronden which was broadcast from Örebro. He was a host on the radio program Sommar during the years 1973, 1976, and 1977. Pontén also appeared as a priest in the film version of Nils Parling's Finnbastu which was produced by SVT Örebro in the early 1980s.

He was first married between 1957–1962 to the artist Lillan Berg Hagenfeldt (1936–2006), daughter of the engineer Edde Berg and Ebba, née Kaeding, and then from 1963 to Lillemor Gustafsson (1933–2005), daughter of auditor Gösta Gustafsson och Ingeborg Gustafsson.

== Bibliography ==
- 1980 – Ponténs droppar – Medicinhistoria i fickformat ur TV2-serien Diagnos ISBN 91-522-1599-7
- 1982 – Ponténs pärlor ISBN 91-7756-012-4
- 1982 – Korvpapperet – Jubileumsskrift från Sibylla och AB Lithells
- 1983 – Narrkåpor – Lättsinnigt plock ur historieboken ISBN 91-85964-19-0
- 1984 – Muntra minnen ISBN 91-85964-28-X
- 1984 – Liv och kniv – Lättsinnigt plock ur läkarhistorien ISBN 91-85964-21-2
- 1992 – Örebro länslasarett 100 år – En jubileumsskrift
- 1995 – Faster Titti, generalen och jag – och andra dråpliga episoder ur vår historia ISBN 91-88238-20-2
- 1996 – Hej tomtegubbar! - Skrock och skrönor kring julen ISBN 91-552-2736-8
- 1998 – Svensk historia dag för dag ISBN 91-552-2828-3
