= Lennart Ekdal =

Swedish journalist and television presenter

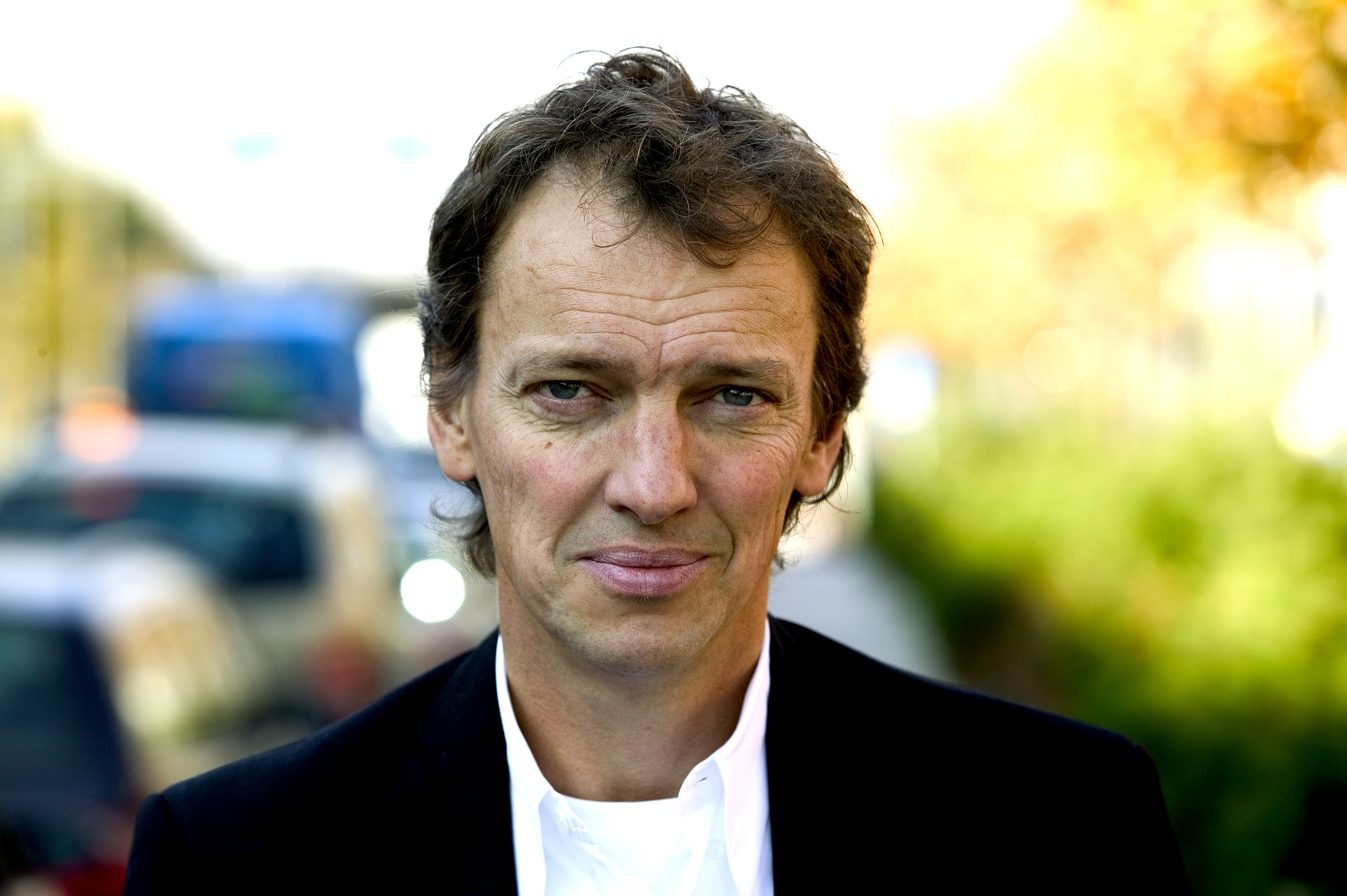
- Lennart Ekdal in September 2008.
- Born: 19 November 1953 (age 72); Linköping, Sweden
- Occupations: Journalist, television host, musician
- Years active: 1980s–present
- Children: Albin Ekdal (b. 1989); Hjalmar Ekdal (b. 1998)

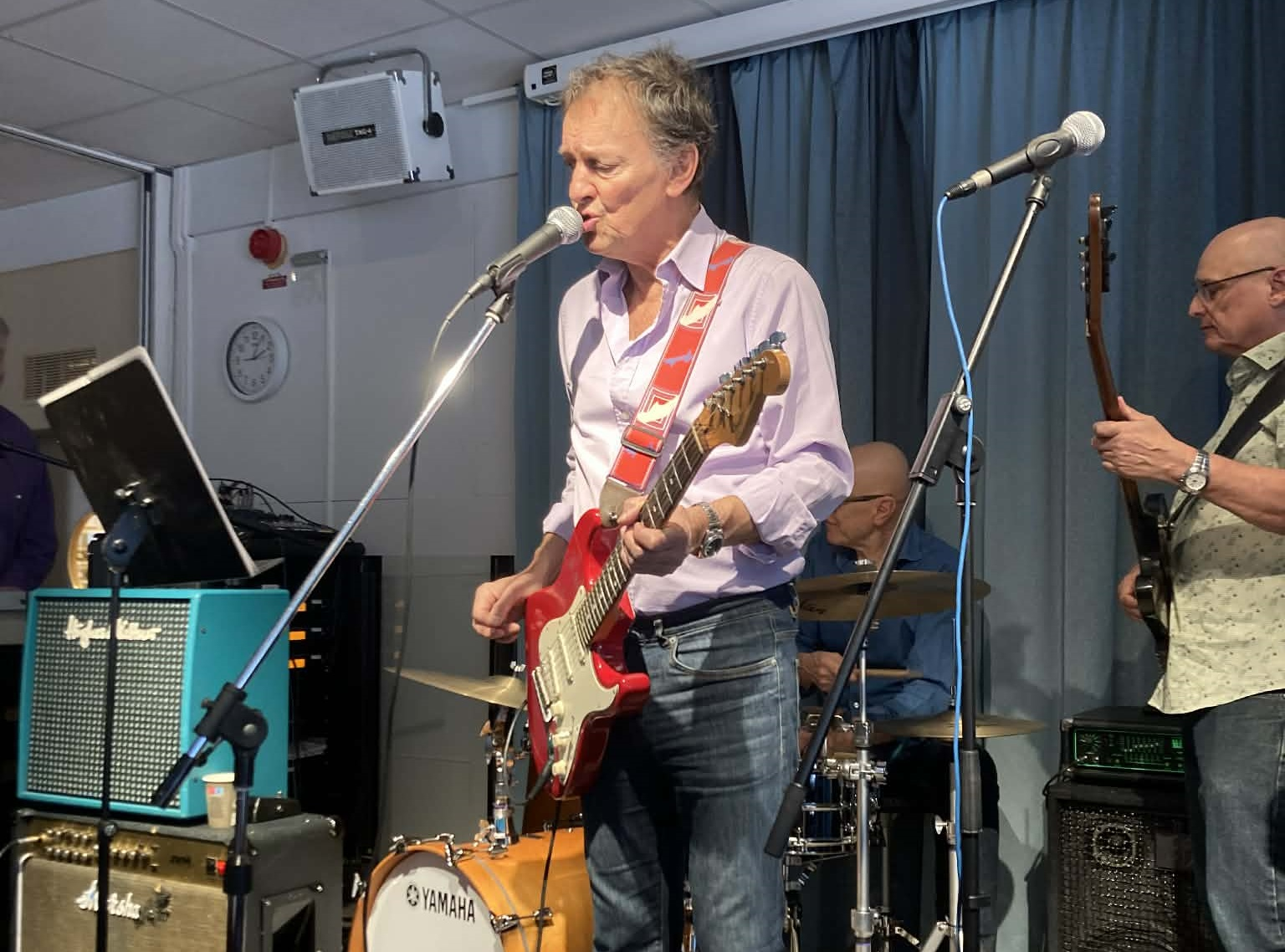
Ekdal with his band in Stockholm in 2026

Lennart Ekdal (born 19 November 1953) is a Swedish journalist and television presenter.

== Career ==
Born in Linköping, Östergötland, he began his career in financial journalism in the 1980s and is best known for his work on several TV4 programs, starting in 1990, before leaving in 2013.

Before his success with TV4, Ekdal worked for the national public television broadcaster Sveriges Television (SVT), the daily newspaper Dagens Nyheter and the weekly business journal Veckans Affärer.

He has also begun to appear with his own rock'n'roll band.

== Personal life ==
Ekdal is the father of the professional footballers Albin Ekdal (born 1989) and Hjalmar Ekdal (born 1998).
