= Alexander Aizenshtat =

French painter

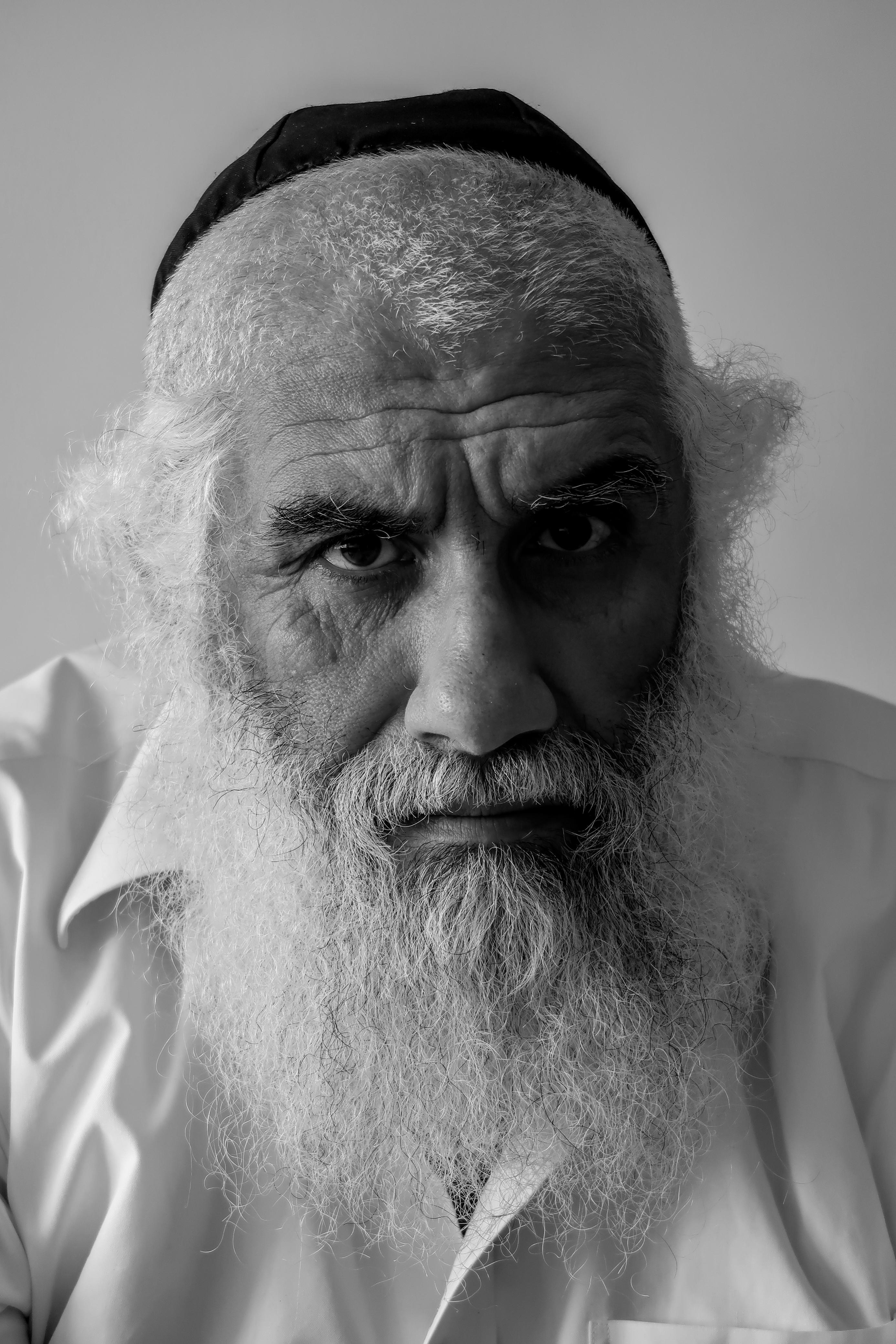
- Born: 2 December 1951; Moscow, Russia
- Known for: Art, painting
- Website: www.alexander-aizenshtat.com

Alexander Aizenshtat (Alexander Eisenstadt; born 1951) is a French artist known as the founder of a new movement in world fine arts – metaphysical expressionism. He lives and works in Jerusalem, in Beit Meir. He is also known for following Orthodox Jewish practice, keeping the requirements strictly. He is currently working in the Kingdom of Bahrain to prepare a substantive collection of new paintings under the auspices of the Ministry of Foreign Affairs with continued support of Sheikh Rashid bin Khalifa Al Khalifa.

== Early life ==
Alexander Aizenshtat was born in 1951 in Moscow, Russia and grew up at Chistye prudy area to a well-to-do Russian-Jewish family. His father was a lawyer and an advocate of the City Faculty of Advocates, graduate of the Law Faculty of Moscow State University. Artist’s mother was a linguist and a philologist, a teacher of German language, a graduate of the Romanic-German department of Moscow State University.

Aizenshtat studied painting at the artistic school named after Serov at Prechistenka Street in the late 60s, continuing his studies in the studio of artist S. P. Skulskiy in the early 70s.

After his studies, in 1974, Aizenshtat moved to Israel, where he lived in the city of Safed (where the tradition of studying and interpreting of Kabbala was shaped) and in the kibbutz of Manheim. The picturesque outskirts inspired his creativity and he continued to paint. After he served in the army, Alexander Aizenshtat dedicated himself to religion, he started studying Torah and Talmud in a Yeshiva in Jerusalem. In 1980, Aizenshtat married a French woman, Sonia Smadja, and moved to Paris. In 1989, he founded the Center for Torah Studies in Moscow. Alexander Aizenshtat followed Orthodox Jewish practice for much of his life, keeping the requirements strictly.

== Career and exhibitions ==
As a young artist, Aizenshtat was exhibited in private houses around the world, including Paris and New York. His works were sold privately.

Since, 2010, he started getting recognition and exhibiting in Moscow including Moscow Museum of Modern Art, Triumph Gallery, Bulgakov Museum and others.

In 2016, Alexander Aizenshtat’s artworks were exhibited at the Pushkin State Museum of Fine Arts curated by Irina Antonova and Andrey Tolstoy (Director of the Research Institute of Theory and History of Fine Arts of the Russian Academy of Arts (RAKh).

Also, in November 2016, Aizenshtat's works were exhibited in the Tretyakov Gallery on Krymsky Val curated by Zelfira Tregulova (a fine art expert and the Director of the Tretyakov Gallery).

In January 2017, his series of paintings called «Spectrum of Life» were exhibited at Christies’s in Moscow. In the summer of 2017, the Gallery of the Frida Project Foundation, partnered with Sberbank also displays these series. The curator of the exhibition was Mikhail Slobodinskiy.

In 2018, «Spectrum of Life» was exhibited in The Jewish Museum in Eisenstadt in Austria.

== Critical responses ==
Among curators and art collectors and others in the art world, Aizenshtat’ work received a positive response.

Irina Antonova - President of the Pushkin Museum is a staunch supporter, labelling Aizenshtat a genius, she said that "in the history of world art, every stage had prominent artists, who cannot be compared. Alexander Aizenshtat does not follow somebody's school, but creates a world of his own."

The Doctor of Fine Arts and academician at RAKh Alexander Yakimovich claims that the works of Alexander Aizenshtat's resemble those of Rembrandt in the force of impact and the profundity of artistic images. In his article for «Collection. Art and Culture» Journal, he states that Aizenshtat is an "enigmatic artist, who never fails to amaze."

Andrey Tolstoy, Director of the Research Institute of Theory and History of Fine Arts of the Russian Academy of Arts (RAKh) noted that "Alexander is a man with a gift of genius, having all the abilities of painting, coloring, and composition."

Professor Andrey Lvovich Yurganov recognised Alexander Aizenshtat as the founder of a new movement in world fine arts - metaphysical expressionism.

== Connections ==
Alexander Aizenshtat maintains good communication with many famous galleries including the Pushkin Museum of Fine Arts, MMMA, Tretyakov Gallery and famous people art world, such as the president of The Pushkin State Museum of Fine Art, Msr. Irina Antonova, director of the Tretyakov Gallery, Zelfira Ismailovna Tregulova and others. January 10, 2016, as part of a CER dinner, Mikhail Fridman together with the London Jewish community presented a series of lithographs "Jewish Family" of Alexander Aizenshtat to the former president of France, Nicolas Sarkozy.

== Collectors ==
Alexander Aizenshtat's works are in Moscow Museum of Modern Art and in private collections throughout the world, including Aaron Frenkel, David Nahmad, Nicolas Sarkozy, Dmitry Medvedev and the Prince of Monaco, Albert II.
