= Mannheimer =

Mannheimer is a German language surname, meaning a person from Mannheim. Spelling variants include Manheimer and Mannerheim. It may refer to:

- Albert Mannheimer (1913–1972), American writer
- Anna Mannheimer (born 1963), Swedish journalist
- Carin Mannheimer (1934–2014), Swedish writer
- Clara Mannheimer (born 1968), Swedish journalist
- Fritz Mannheimer (1890–1939), German banker
- Isaac Noah Mannheimer (1793–1865), Austrian rabbi
- Louise Herschman Mannheimer (1845-1920), Czech-American writer
- Max Mannheimer (1920–2016), Czech writer
- Renato Mannheimer (born 1947), Italian sociologist
- Sara Mannheimer (born 1967), Swedish novelist

== See also ==
- Mannheimer Rosengarten, a venue in Mannheim
- Mannheimer HC, a German sports club
- Mannheim (disambiguation)
