= Anna Mongait =

Russian journalist and television presenter

- А́нна Ви́кторовна Монга́йт
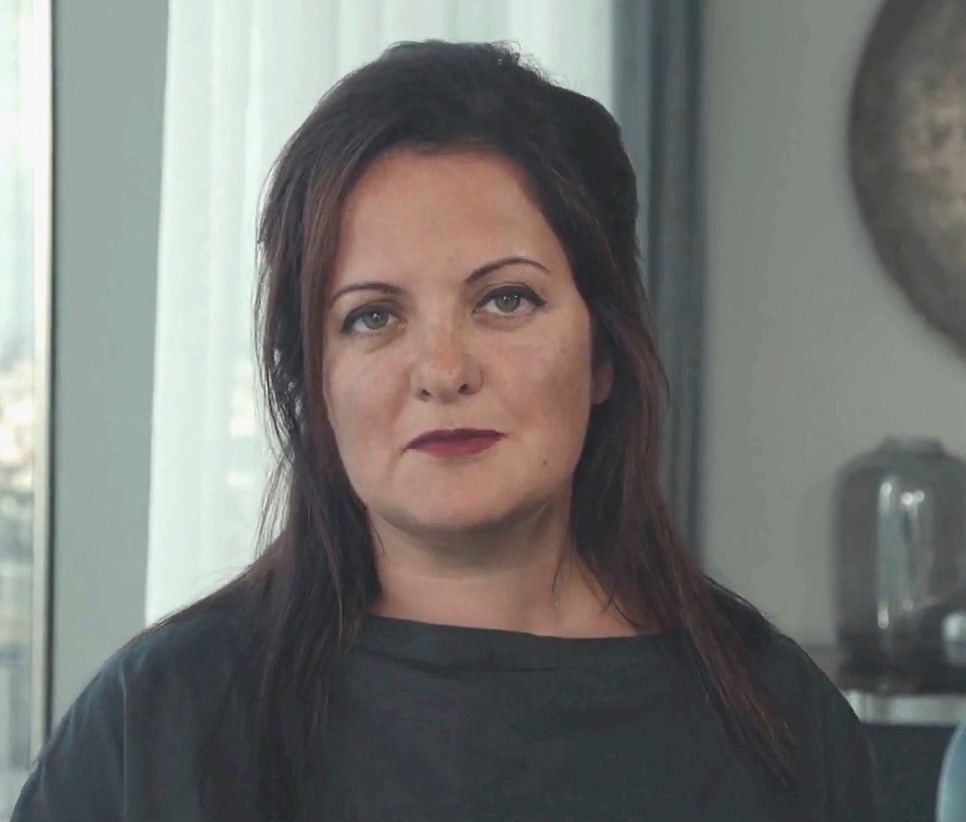
- Mongait in 2019
- Born: А́нна Ви́кторовна Лоша́к; March 9, 1978 (age 48); Odesa, Ukrainian Soviet Socialist Republic
- Citizenship: Russian
- Education: Russian New University
- Occupations: journalist, TV-host, producer
- Organization: TV Rain

Anna Viktorovna Mongait (Russian: А́нна Ви́кторовна Монга́йт, née Loshak (Russian: Лоша́к)) is a Russian journalist, television presenter, and creative producer of the TV Rain channel.

== Early life ==
Mongait was born in 1978 in Odesa, Ukrainian Soviet Socialist Republic. She studied journalism at the Lomonosov Moscow State University and Russian New University.

== Career ==
Mongait worked as an editor at the Channel One Russia, Russia-1, and Russia-K.

From 2001 to 2004, she was a news correspondent for NTV.

From 2005 to 2010, she hosted the "About Art" program on Russia-K.

Since 2010, she has regularly published articles on contemporary artists in Tatler. The same year, she started working as a TV host on TV Rain. Since 2015, she has hosted the regular programs "Here and now" and "Women on top" on the same TV channel.

In 2021, Mongait received death threats from the far-right "Male State" group after she interviewed a same-sex couple for the "Women on top" program.

Due to the Russian invasion of Ukraine, the Russian government blocked TV Rain in March 2022. Consequently, Mongait had to leave the country. As of December 2022, she lived in Riga and continued working on the channel which resumed its operation in July the same year.

In November 2022, the Russian Ministry of Justice included Mongait in the list of foreign agents. In July 2025, a "war fakes" (Article 207.3) criminal case was opened on Mongait for her telegram posts about Russian attacks on Odesa.

== Personal life ==
Mongait is of Jewish origin. Her father, Viktor Loshak, is a journalist. He worked as the former chief editor of the Ogoniok journal. Her mother, Marina Loshak, is the director of the Pushkin State Museum of Fine Arts in Moscow. Her cousin is Andrei Loshak, a journalist and documentary filmmaker.

Anna Mongait is married to Sergei Mongait, who works as a creative director at a design studio. They have two sons.
