= Nakkna =

Swedish fashion label

Nakkna is a Swedish fashion label based in Stockholm, Sweden.

Founded in 2003, Nakkna is known for its avant-garde, yet commercial, designs where complex constructions and draping are manifested in clean shapes without unnecessary embellishment. Nakkna is sold in fashion stores through Europe and selected cities in Asia and USA. Nakkna is run by designers Camilla Sundin, Claes Berkes and Ella Soccorsi, who all met at Beckmans School of Design in Stockholm, which they graduated from in 2001 in fashion design.

== Awards ==
- 2004 Designer of the Year from Nöjesguiden Magazine
- 2004 the Hero Award from national newspaper Dagens Nyheter
- 2003 Elle Magazine Best Newcomer Award

They were also nominated for the Future Design Award in 2004

== Other projects and collaborations ==
Absolut Vodka commissioned Nakkna to design cocktail glasses. for them and they also designed a Limited editions bag for Sony PSP

The Swedish Postal stamps collection released in August 2007 also futures Nakkna as one of the new breed of Swedish Design Labels.
