= Mannheim (disambiguation) =

Mannheim is a city in Germany.

Mannheim or Manheim may also refer to:

== Buildings ==
- Manheim (hof), a neopagan building in Denmark
- Mannheim (San Mar, Maryland), U.S., a historic home and grist mill
- Mannheim (Linville, Virginia), U.S., a historic home built in 1788
- Mannheim station (Illinois), a Metra commuter railroad station in Franklin Park, Illinois

== Places ==
- Mannheim, Ontario, Canada
- Markham Village, Ontario, was known as Mannheim
- Manheim, New York, U.S.
- Manheim, Pennsylvania, U.S.
- Manheim Township, Lancaster County, Pennsylvania, U.S.
- Manheim, West Virginia, U.S., a neighborhood of the town of Rowlesburg
- Manheim, Germany, a subdivision of the town of Kerpen, in the Rhein-Erft-Kreis district

== Other uses ==
- Mannheim (electoral district), a constituency for the German Bundestag (parliament)
- Mannheim (surname)
- Manheim Auctions, a major wholesale automobile auction company
- Mannheim Road, a major north-south thoroughfare in the suburbs of Chicago, Illinois, U.S.
- Mannheim School District 83, Franklin Park, Illinois
- Mannheim Steamroller, an American Neoclassical new-age music group
- Mannheim Tornados, a baseball and softball club from Mannheim, Baden-Württemberg
- FV Mannheim, a trawler requisitioned by the Kriegsmarine during World War II
- University of Mannheim, Mannheim, Baden-Württemberg, Germany
- VfR Mannheim, a German association football club based in Mannheim, Baden-Württemberg
- "(Weird) Manheim", a song by the band Mayhem on their 1987 EP Deathcrush

== See also ==
- Mannheim School, a school of classical music
- Midgard or Mannheimr, the home of men in Norse mythology
- Mannheimer
