= Peter Apelgren =

Swedish artist and comedian

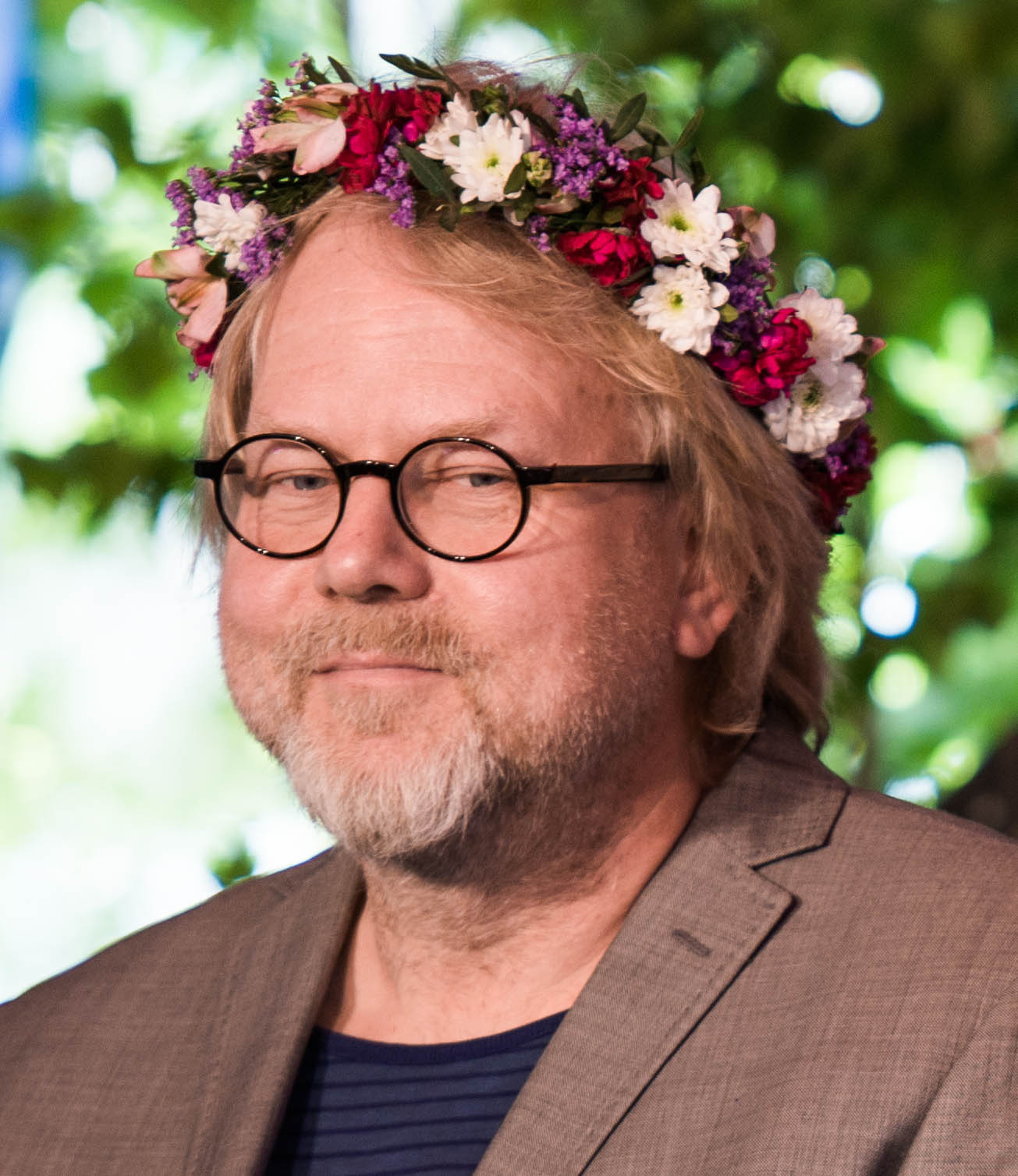
- Apelgren in June 2015
- Born: Ulf Peter Apelgren; 13 February 1959 (age 67); Gothenburg, Sweden
- Occupations: Comedian, artist
- Spouse: Anna Mannheimer

Ulf Peter Apelgren (born 13 February 1959) is a Swedish artist and comedian. He is married to Anna Mannheimer.

Apelgren has worked at Sveriges Radio P3. As comedian he is well known for improvising his humour, which he does in the programs. In 2005 he made the Christmas show Cabaretfantomen på taket at Trädgårn Restaurant in Gothenburg. He has appeared in the humour program Lycka till broadcast by Kanal Lokal Göteborg.

He appeared at the opening of the 2006 European Athletics Championships where he showed his own picture on Pablo Picasso.

Apelgren and Hélène Benno won På spåret 2010/2011.
