= Irina Antonova =

Russian art historian (1922–2020)

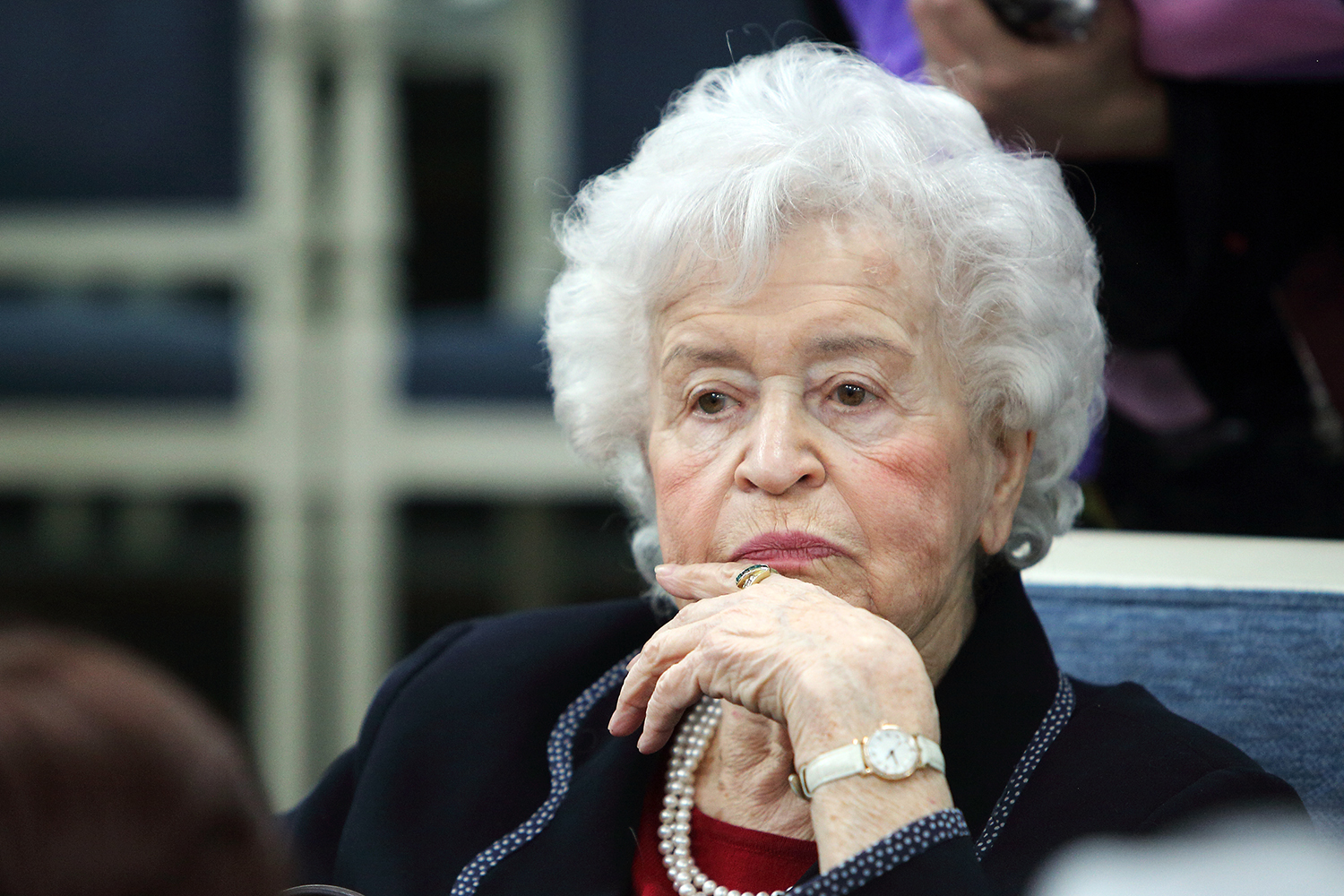
- Antonova in 2014
- Born: 20 March 1922; Moscow, Russian SFSR
- Died: 30 November 2020 (aged 98); Moscow, Russia
- Resting place: Novodevichy Cemetery
- Education: Moscow State University
- Occupation: Art historian

Irina Aleksandrovna Antonova (Russian: Ири́на Алекса́ндровна Анто́нова; 20 March 1922 – 30 November 2020) was a Soviet and Russian art historian who served as a Director of the Pushkin Museum in Moscow for 52 years, from 1961 to 2013, making her the oldest and the longest serving director of a major art museum in the world. Among her many awards and decorations are the State Prize of the Russian Federation and the Ordre des Arts et des Lettres. She was the President of the Pushkin Museum, a ceremonial post.

== Career ==
Irina Antonova was born in Moscow in the family of Aleksandr Aleksandrovich Antonov, a ship electrician and then director of the Institute of Experimental Glass, and Ida Mikhailovna Heifitz (died when she was 100 years and 5 months old).

From 1929 to 1933 she lived with her parents in Germany. From 1940, she was a student in the art history department of the Institute of Philosophy, Literature and History. In 1941, after the IFLI was merged with Moscow State University, she became a student of the Faculty of Philology at Lomonosov Moscow State University.

She studied under Boris Vipper at the Moscow University, graduating in 1945. Later that year she joined the staff of the Pushkin Museum. In February 1961 Nikita Khrushchev put her in charge of the museum. In this capacity, Antonova initiated and organised major international exhibitions, including Moscow-Paris, Moscow-Berlin, Russia-Italy, Modigliani, Turner, Picasso and many others. Author of more than 100 publications (catalogues, articles, albums, TV shows, scripts of popular science films). For a number of years she taught at the Art History Department of Moscow State University, at the Institute of Cinematography, in the GMII auditorium and at the Institute of Oriental Languages in Paris.

Antonova oversaw art collections which were taken by Soviet Union from Germany after World War II. She first denied that such collections exist, and when it was apparent that they exist started publicly stating that the collections were taken to the Soviet Union legally and should be exempt from restitution. Antonova witnessed the entire collection of the Dresden Gallery arriving at the museum from Germany in 1945 and its removal ten years later. She opposed the return of the collection to Germany, claiming it was a just compensation for the damage inflicted on Russia's cultural heritage by the German invaders. The museum still holds Priam's Treasure, taken as a trophy by the Red Army after the Battle of Berlin.

Antonova's interests revolved around Impressionist and Modern art. In 1948, the Pushkin Museum acquired considerable holdings of these works from the nationalized collections of Sergei Shchukin and Ivan Morozov. Antonova long supported the recreation of the State Museum of New Western Art, a museum created from the collections of Shchukin and Morozov, disestablished by Stalin in 1948. The collections of the museum were dispersed to the Pushkin and the Hermitage Museum. The Hermitage was reluctant to let its collection go to the proposed museum, and Antonova and the Hermitage director, Mikhail Piotrovsky publicly disagreed over the issue.

Antonova was also instrumental in establishing Sviatoslav Richter's December Nights, an international music festival that has been held in the museum since 1981.

The Russian Government proposed an online "virtual museum", which Antonova rejected. A spokesperson for Russian President Vladimir Putin said that "the chances of creating such a museum fall significantly" after Piotrovsky's disapproval. Antonova later said people who were against the recreation of the museum were "adhering to a decree of Stalin." Shortly after the controversy, on 10 July 2013, Antonova was fired and replaced by Marina Loshak. Antonova explained that she herself chose a successor, later specified that she had actually proposed cultural scientists as her successors, but all her candidacies were rejected by the Ministry. Of the candidates proposed by the Ministry, Loshak seemed to be the most acceptable to her.

Antonova died on 30 November 2020, from COVID-19 and its complications. She was buried, in accordance with her wishes, in the columbarium of Novodevichy Cemetery in Moscow, next to her loved ones — her mother and husband. The farewell ceremony took place on December 3, 2020, at the Pushkin State Museum of Fine Arts in a closed format due to the pandemic, and the funeral was held on December 4, with military honors, as she was a full holder of the Order “For Merit to the Fatherland”.

== Political views ==
Member of the Civic Chamber of the Russian Federation (2011–2020), in 2012 she entered the list of trustees of the presidential candidate Vladimir Putin. In 2014, she signed the Collective Appeal of Cultural Workers of the Russian Federation in support of the policy of Russian President Vladimir Putin in Ukraine and Crimea. She condemned the prison sentence imposed on Pussy Riot.

== Personal life ==
She was married to Russian art historian Evsey Rotenberg, who died in 2011. They had a son, Boris Rotenberg (born in 1954).

She was fluent in German, French and Italian. Antonova died on 30 November 2020 at the age of 98.

== Honours and awards ==
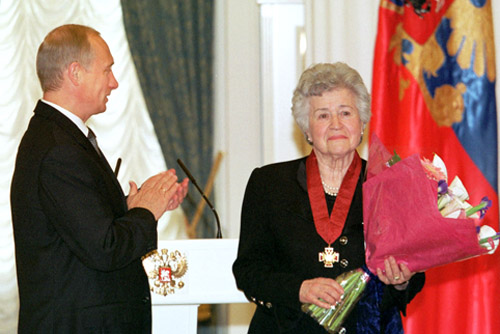
Antonova receives the Order "For Merit to the Fatherland" from President Putin, 2002

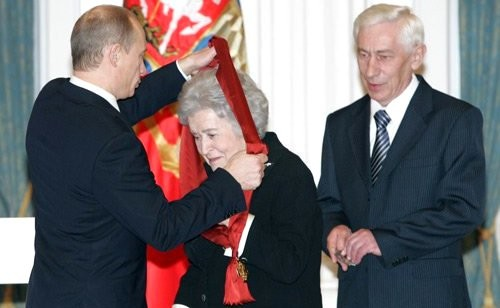
Antonova receives the Order "For Merit to the Fatherland" from President Putin, 2007

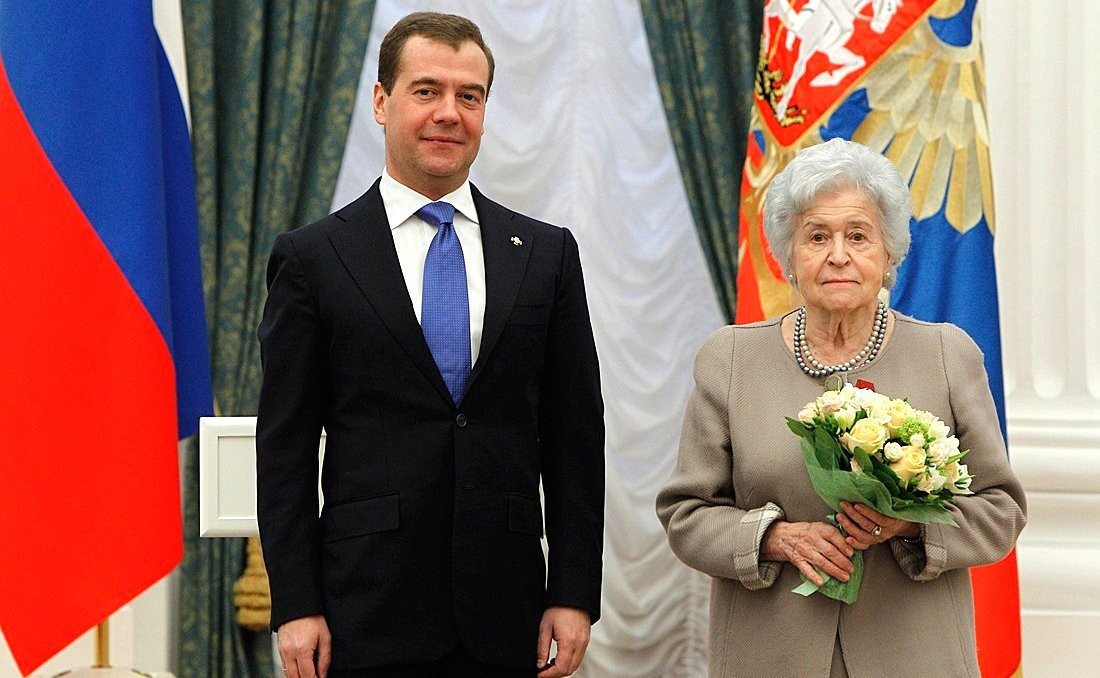
Antonova receives the Order "For Merit to the Fatherland" from President Medvedev, 2012

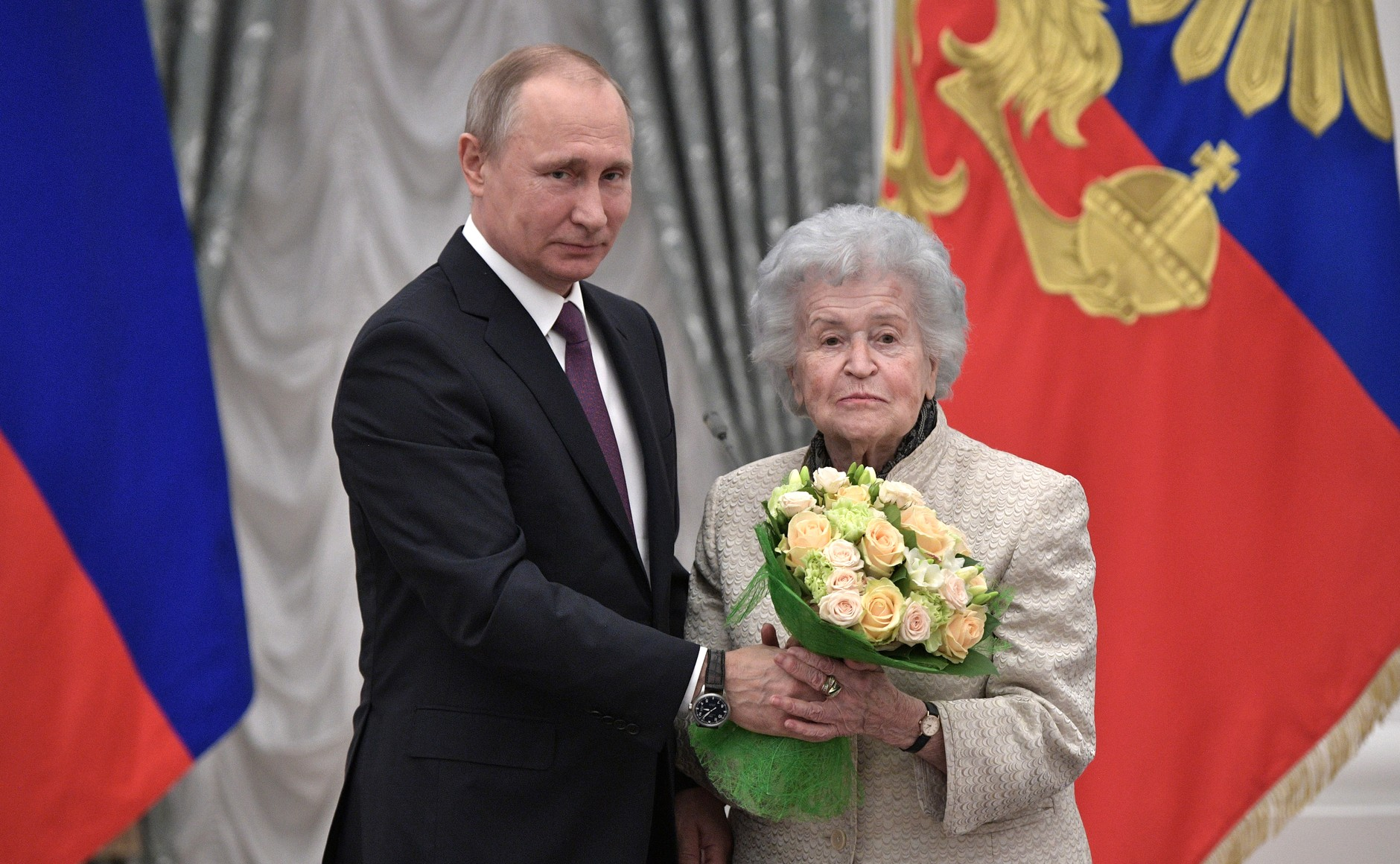
Antonova receives the Decoration "For Beneficence" from President Putin, 2017

- Order "For Merit to the Fatherland":
  - 1st class (6 December 2007), for outstanding contribution to the development of museums, preservation, and promotion of national and world heritage
  - 2nd class (20 March 2002), for outstanding contribution to the development of national culture
  - 3rd class (17 March 1997), for services to the state and the great personal contribution to the preservation of the national cultural heritage of Russia
  - 4th class (28 February 2012)
- Order of the October Revolution
- Order of the Red Banner of Labour
- Honoured Worker of the Arts Industry of the RSFSR
- State Prize of the Russian Federation (1995)
- Commander of the Ordre des Arts et des Lettres (France)
- Commander of the Order of Merit of the Italian Republic (7 December 2000)
- Public Prize "Treasury of the Motherland"

== Commemoration ==
On 20 March 2021, a memorial plaque was unveiled on the façade of the Pushkin Museum.

On 20 March 2022, a memorial plaque was installed on the building at 14/5 Pokrovsky Boulevard, where Antonova lived from 1942 to 1982.

On 5 October 2022, a previously unnamed public garden located in front of the Pushkin Museum was named in honor of Irina Antonova.
