= Anna Mannheimer =

Swedish television and radio presenter, journalist and comedian (born 1963)

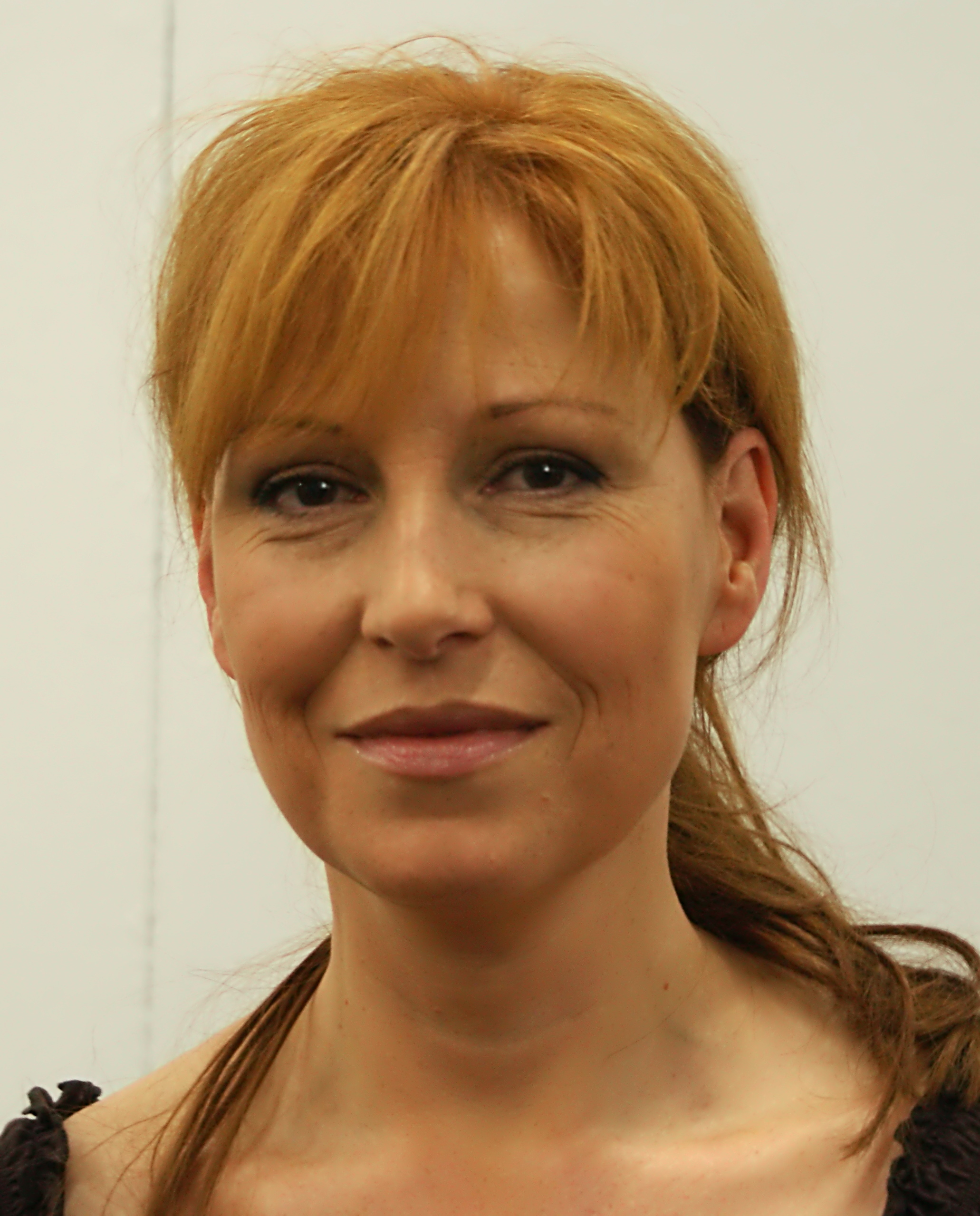
- Anna Mannheimer at the Gothenburg Book Fair in 2008
- Born: Anna Franciska Mannheimer; 5 July 1963 (age 62); Gothenburg, Sweden
- Occupations: Journalist; TV and radio personality; Comedian
- Spouse: Peter Apelgren
- Parents: Sören Mannheimer (father); Carin Mannheimer (mother)
- Relatives: Clara Mannheimer (cousin); Love Mannheimer (paternal grandfather)

Anna Franciska Mannheimer (born 5 July 1963) is a Swedish television and radio presenter, journalist and comedian.

Mannheimer is well known as a television talk show host and presenter of several radio programmes. Among her best known programmes are Rally, Let's Go and Detta har hänt. She also participated in Svenska hjärtan as Franciska Mannheimer.

She debuted as a radio presenter with Sveriges Radio P4 Väst. Her popular podcast Skäringer & Mannheimer, co-presented with actor Mia Skäringer, ran for 187 episodes before they announced its cancellation in 2021.

== Personal life ==
Mannheimer was born in Gothenburg, the daughter of Sören and Carin Mannheimer, and cousin of Clara Mannheimer. She is married to Peter Apelgren. They adopted a child from China.
