= Mannheim (surname) =

Mannheim or Manheim is a surname. Notable people with the surname include:

- Amédée Mannheim (1831–1906), French inventor of the modern slide rule
- Camryn Manheim (born 1961), American actress
- Jean Mannheim (1863–1945), German-born American painter and educator
- Karl Mannheim (1893–1947), Hungarian sociologist
- Kjetil Manheim (born 1968), Norwegian musician
- Lucie Mannheim (1899–1976), German actress
- Milo Manheim (born 2001), American actor
- Ralph Manheim (1907–1992), American translator
- Robbie Mannheim or Roland Doe (born c. 1935), a boy who was exorcised in the late 1940s, partial inspiration for The Exorcist novel and film
- Milo Manheim (born 2001), American actor

Fictional characters include:

- Bruno Mannheim, one of Superman's enemies
- Moxie "Boss" Mannheim, a DC Comics villain
