= Clara Mannheimer =

Swedish journalist (born 1968)

Clara Johanna Mannheimer
- Born: September 13, 1968 (age 57); Örgryte, Sweden
- Education: Magister professional degree from Uppsala University
- Occupations: Journalist, producer, project manager
- Employer: SVT
- Known for: Creator of Flocken, producer of Streams, Hallberg, and Herr Talman
- Notable work: Kobra, Elbyl, Flocken
- Family: Father: Jon Mannheimer (lawyer); Cousin: Anna Mannheimer (radio presenter)

Clara Johanna Mannheimer (born 13 September 1968 in Örgryte, Sweden) is a Swedish journalist, who is a producer and project manager at SVT Kultur & Samhälle where she works on the TV program Kobra.

Mannheimer has a magister professional degree from Uppsala University and has studied at journalist university college. She has been a society reporter in the TV program Elbyl and editor-in-chief for Nöjesguiden. She has presented programs in Sveriges Radio, among them Sommar on 8 August 1996.

She is known as the creator and writer of the TV programme Flocken (2019), as well as producing the TV programmes Streams (2020), Hallberg (2021) and Herr Talman (2022).

In 2023, she became the program commissioner for culture and events at SVT.

== Family ==
She is daughter to the lawyer Jon Mannheimer and cousin to radio presenter Anna Mannheimer.
