= Carin Mannheimer =

Swedish author, dramatist and director (1934–2014)

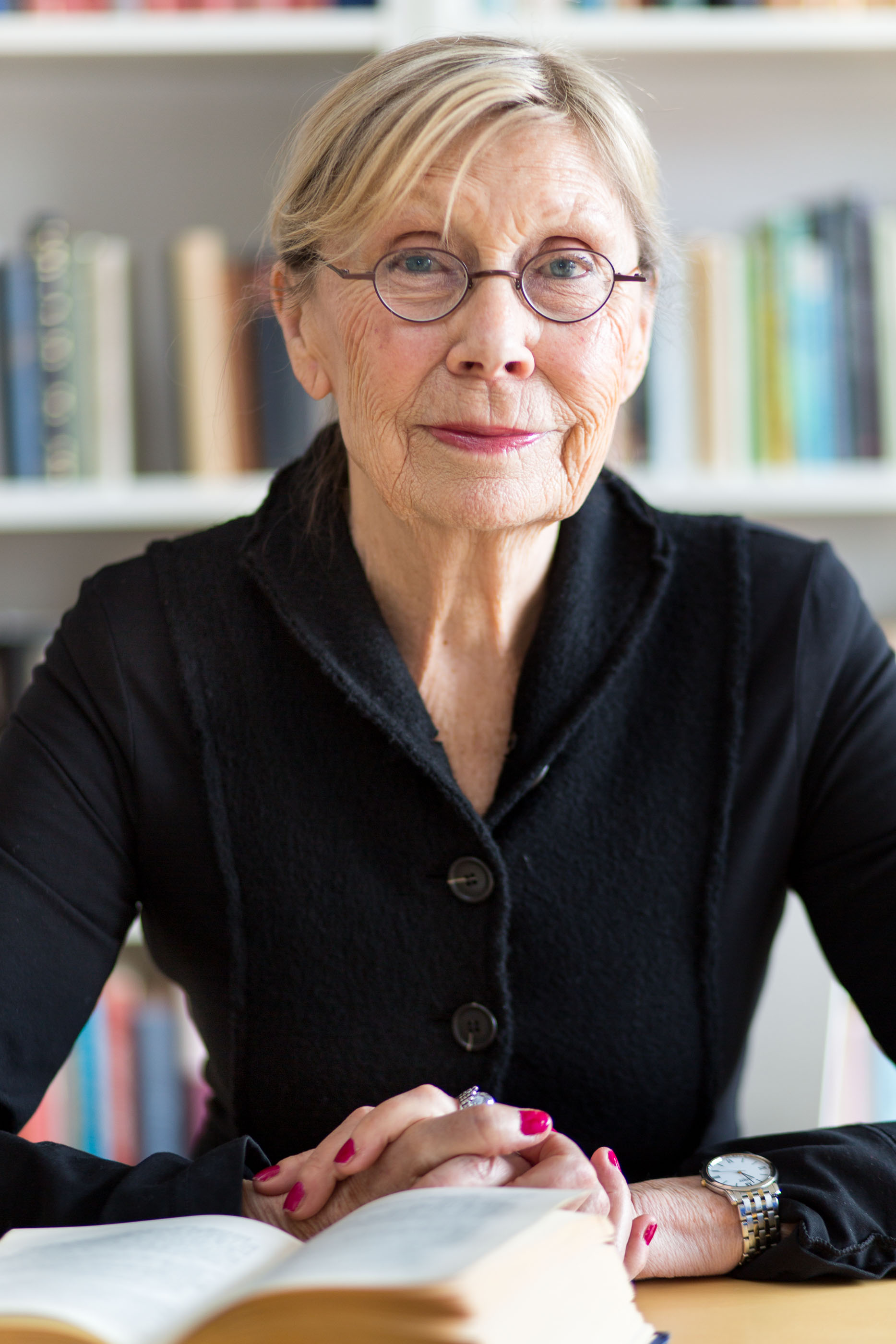
- Carin Mannheimer (2013)
- Born: Karin Birgitta Jacobson; 17 August 1934; Osby, Sweden
- Died: 11 July 2014 (aged 79); Gothenburg, Sweden
- Resting place: Osby kyrkogård, Osby, Sweden
- Education: Lund University; Bachelor of Arts (1955); Master of Philosophy (1957)
- Occupations: Screenwriter; author; film director
- Title: Doctor (Honorary doctorate)
- Spouses: Sören Mannheimer (1957–1977) Gunnar Hanson (1980–1990)
- Children: 2, including Anna Mannheimer

Carin Mannheimer (born Karin Birgitta Jacobson; 17 August 1934 – 11 July 2014) was a Swedish dramatist, screenwriter, author and film director, born in Osby, Sweden. She garnered acclaim with Rapport om kvinnor (Swedish: Report on Women), which was published in 1969. The book is a collection of interviews with Swedish women from the working class. This was during a time period of awakening feminism in Sweden when women were assumed to want to work outside the home. The interviews, however, revealed that many women did not want to work outside the home, would have preferred to care for their children but had no economic choice. For this reason, Mannheimer was criticized by the women's movement in Sweden, and the book established her reputation as a social critic.

== Television ==
The situation of women, children, and the elderly in society are recurring themes in Mannheimer's writing, including the television mini-series she wrote and directed; Lära för livet (Swedish:Learning for Life; 1977), about a fictional ninth-grade class. The series was aired in all the Nordic countries, and parents and teachers welcomed the realistic portrayal of compulsory public schools, while politicians criticized Mannheimer for exaggeration. Svenska hjärtan (swedish:Swedish Hearts; 1987–98) was a long-running series about nine neighbors in an affluent neighborhood who belong to a new class of Swedish white-collar workers. In Mannheimer's series, the economic upswing these neighbors experience is contrasted with the downside of a superficial, keeping-up-with-the-Jones's existence. The women in the series bear the brunt of the conflicts.

== Theater ==
The play Sista dansen (not to be confused with the Swedish movie Sista dansen, directed by Colin Nutley, 1993) is an offshoot of the TV series Solbacken: Avd E (swedish:Solbacken: Ward E, 2003) written and directed by Mannheimer. In an interview conducted in September 2013, Mannheimer says that she wanted to examine elder care in the same manner as she had examined the school world. Her interest was in how an institution in a welfare society functioned and whether or not it was good. Sista Dansen is a 2-act play about patients from diverse economic, educational, and social backgrounds who can no longer care for themselves and are forced to remain until the end of life in a locked facility for the elderly. The diverse backgrounds of the characters and the employees of the facility are a source of both humorous and thought-provoking conflicts.

Sista dansen was followed by a second play on the theme of aging, existential anxiety, and growing weak in a society that prefers strength, beauty, and speed, I sista minuten (Swedish:At the Last Minute) . This second play differs from the first in that it centers on the lives of three women who have been friends for 30 years. They are well educated, younger than their 90-year-old counterparts in Sista Dansen, and keep pace with the times. One event in the play in which an elderly widower comes to terms with his homosexuality and marries a younger male character reveals Mannheimer's sensitivity to contemporary social issues.

== Personal life ==
Mannheimer was married twice. Her first marriage was in 1957 to Sören Mannheimer, with whom she had two children: Anna Mannheimer and Joakim Mannheimer. The marriage ended in 1977, after which she married Gunnar Hanson in 1980. Her second marriage ended in 1990.

== Death ==
According to a text message sent by her daughter, the journalist Anna Mannheimer, to the daily paper Göteborgs-Posten, Carin Mannheimer died unexpectedly on 11 July 2014 at the age of 79.

== Awards ==
- 2013 – Culture award conferred by Längmanska kulturfonden
- 2011 – honorary doctorate conferred by Sahlgrenska Academy at the University of Gothenburg
- 2010 – Piratenpriset (literary award)
- 1977 – The Swedish Grand Prize for Journalism for the television series Lära för livet

== Selected filmography ==
- 2005 – Saltön (TV) (director and screenwriter)
- 2003 – Solbacken Avd. E [Solbacken Ward E; TV mini-series]
- 2001 – Fru Marianne (TV) (director and screenwriter)
- 1995 – Rika barn leka bäst (director)
- 1997 – Rika barn leka bäst (director and screenwriter)
- 1987–1998 – Svenska hjärtan [Swedish Hearts; TV series]
- 1984 – Tryggare kan ingen vara (TV; director and screenwriter)
- 1981 – Pappa och himlen (screenwriter)
- 1977 – Lära för livet [Learning for Life; TV mini-series]
