= Marina Loshak =

Russian art manager

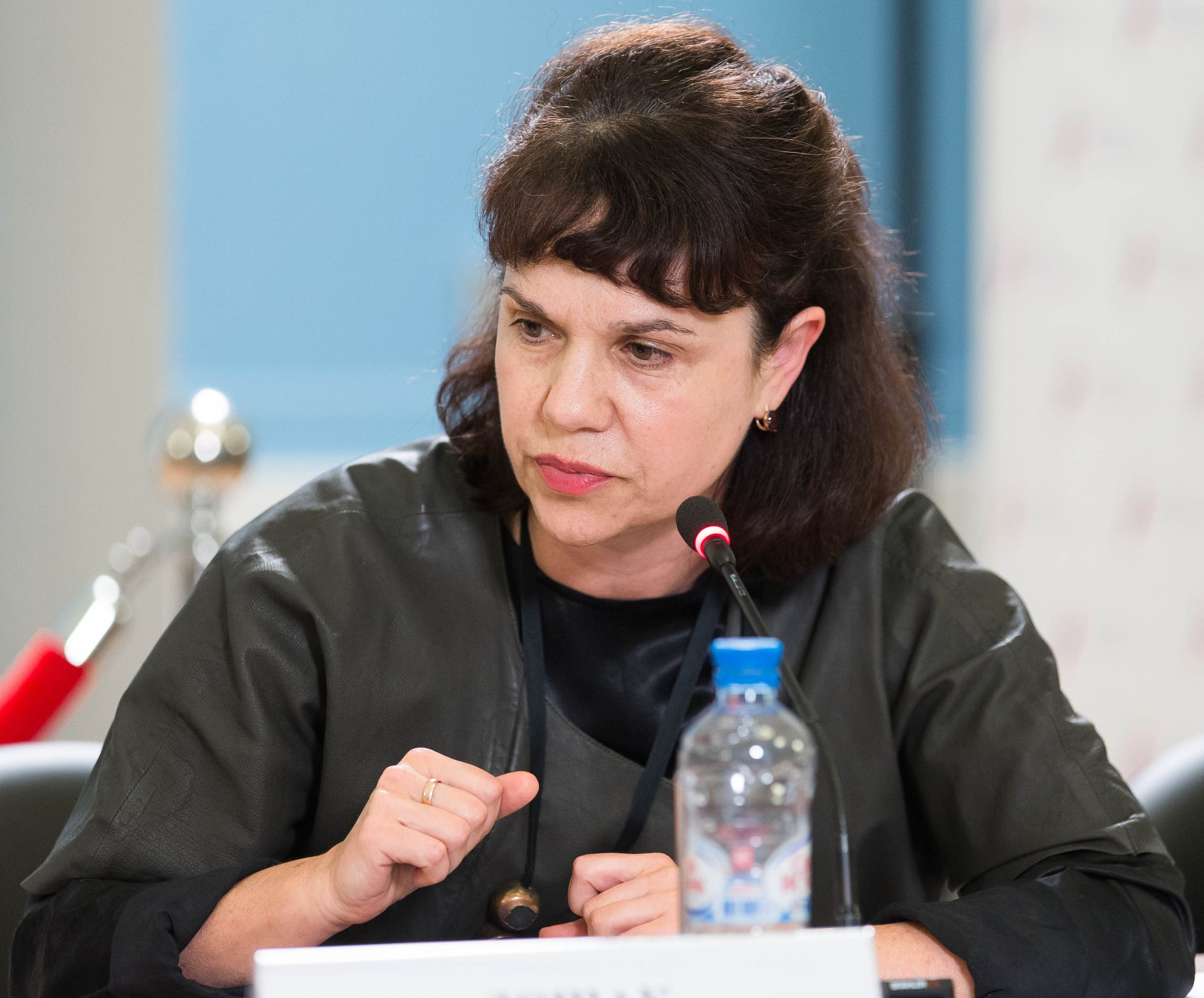

Marina Devovna Loshak (Russian: Мари́на Дэвовна Лоша́к, Ukrainian: Марина Девівна Лошак, surname Boskis; born November 22, 1955, Odesa, Ukrainian SSR, USSR) is a Russian curator, gallery owner, art manager, collector, museum worker. She was the director of the Pushkin Museum from 2013 to 2023.

== Biography ==
Marina Loshak was born in 1955 in Odessa, Ukrainian SSR in a white collar family. She graduated from the Odessa University as a philologist. Later, she worked in the Odessa State Literature Museum and researched the literature of the 1920s.

In 1986, she moved to Moscow to work in the Mayakovsky Museum. From 1989 to 1991, she curated the corporate art collection of the Stolichnyi Bank. Later in 1998, she also became the Chief Manager for Public Relations at the SBS Bank and curated its collection as well.

Loshak founded art galleries Roza Azora (1991) and Proun (2007). She was the head of the Art Center at Neglinnaya Street (1999 to 2003), Harry Tatinsyan Gallery (2005 to 2006), and the Moscow Manege. From 2013 to 2023, she was the head of the Pushkin Museum

She was behind the museum's most notable projects of the decade, such as the exhibitions of the collections of Louis Vuitton Foundation, Sergei Shchukin, Mikhail Morozov and Ivan Morozov.

== Recognition ==
Loshak is the member of the Member of the Expert Councils of the Kandinsky Prize and the Russian Cultural Foundation. She is an honorary member of the Russian Academy of Arts.

== Personal life ==
Loshak is a collector of naive art and headdresses.

She married Viktor Loshak (born 1952), a Russian journalist and editor. Their daughter Anna Mongait (née Loshak, born 1978) is a journalist and TV presenter.
