= Russian New University =

University in Moscow, Russia

- Российский новый университет
- Type: Private
- Established: 1991
- Rector: Vladimir Zernov
- Academic staff: 320
- Students: 18,000 (2015)
- Location: Moscow, Russia
- Campus: Urban
- Website: www.rosnou.ru
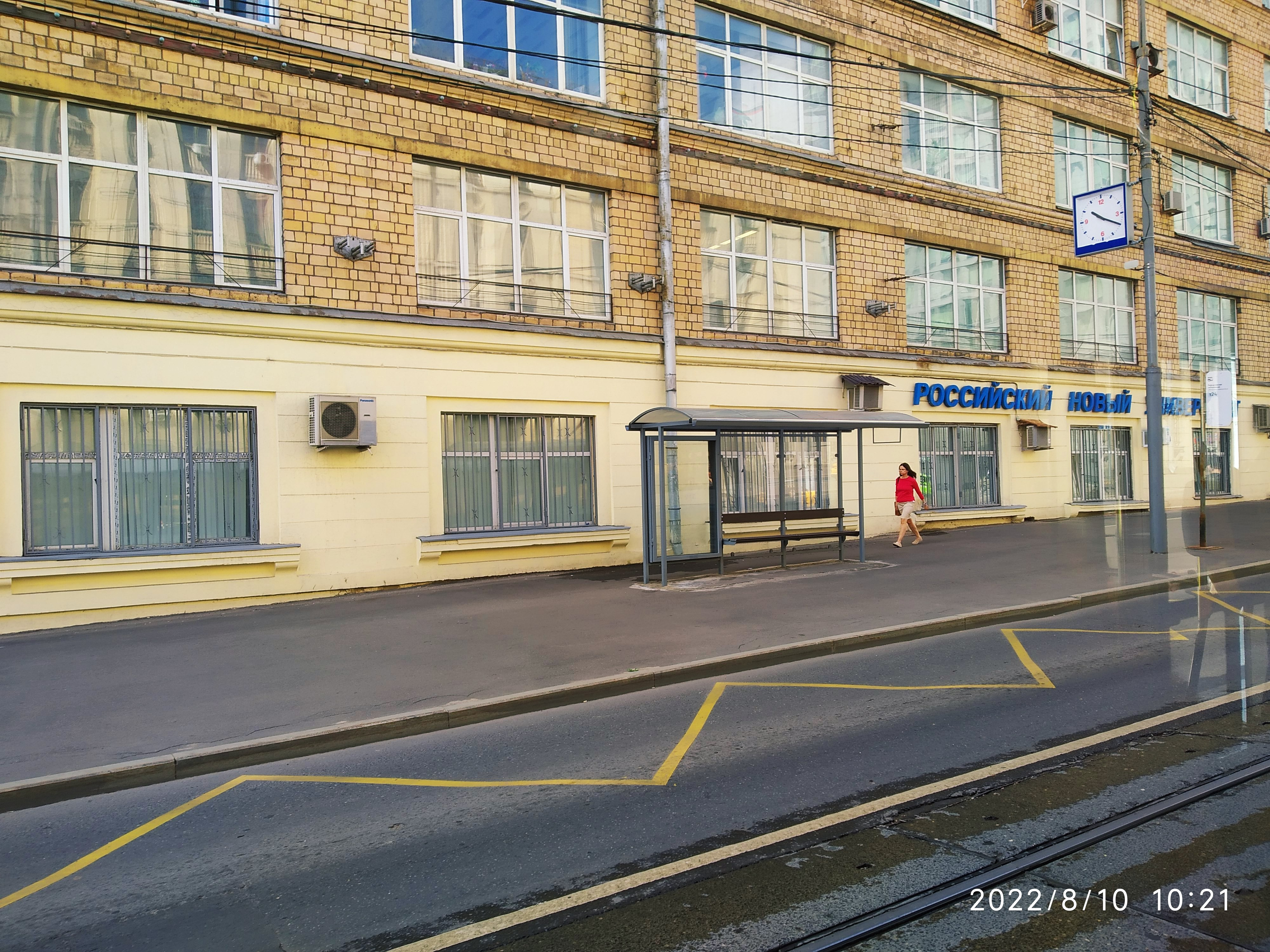

General information
- Coordinates: 55.3766°N 37.5380°E

University rankings

Regional – Overall
- QS Emerging Europe and Central Asia: 401-450 (2022)

Russian New University (RosNOU) (Russian: Российский новый университет, abbreviated РосНОУ) is a Russian non-profit institution of higher education.

== About the University ==
The Autonomous Nonprofit Organization of Higher Education "Russian New University" (ANO IN RosNOU) was established in 1991. Over its 24 years of existence, Russian New University has issued 45 thousand graduates, and currently teaches 18 thousand students. The university has over 161 accredited educational programs. It conducts educational activities on the basis of its license and state accreditation, valid until March 24, 2022. Since 2012, Russian New University has received education funding from the federal budget. At the beginning of 2015 RosNOU had 320 full-time teachers, including 65 doctors of sciences, 184 candidates of sciences, 5 state prize laureates, and 8 foreign teachers. In addition, the university cooperates with teachers at Moscow State University, Moscow State Institute of International Relations, Moscow Institute of Physics and Technology and other Russian and foreign universities. Currently RosNOU is recognized as an effective institution for the results of monitoring by the Ministry of Education and Science of the Russian Federation, is included in the national ranking of universities according to Interfax, is in the hundred best Russian universities according to the Expert RA rating agency, is in the top 200 ranked universities of the Commonwealth of Independent States, and is included in the QS World University Rankings.

== Science and technology ==
The scientific activities of the Russian New University from 1999 to 2012 were led by Sergey Kapitsa (1928-2012). RosNOU's current scientific adviser is Eugene A. Palkin, the winner of the USSR State Prize in the physical and mathematical sciences. In 2007, Microsoft and the Russian New University (RosNOU) signed a "strategic cooperation agreement in the field of development of modern information technologies in the education system", aimed at the development of the Microsoft Education Alliance to expand the use of modern IT at the university. Every year the university holds a contest for student research. By 2015, RosNOU received 14 patents and entered the top five Russian universities on the international scientometric index (h-index).

== Teachers ==
- Eugene A. Palkin- Professor of Physical and Mathematical Sciences, USSR State Prize in Science and Technology laureate.
- Grigory Shabanov- Doctor of pedagogical sciences, Honored Worker of Higher Professional Education. Included in the Russian roster of experts on education quality assessment.
- Andrew S. Kryukovsky- Doctor of Physical and Mathematical Sciences, professor, USSR State Prize in Science and Technology laureate.
- Lukin Dmitry- Doctor of Physical and Mathematical Sciences, Honored Worker of Science, USSR State Prize in Science and Technology laureate.
- Tatyana Regent- Doctor of Economic Sciences and member of the Academy of Social Sciences who served as head of the Federal Migration Service of Russia from 1992 to 1999.
- Sergei Nazipovich- Political scientist in the Department of Sociology who previously served as a senior research fellow at the Ministry of Culture of the Russian Federation.
- Oscar Yakovlevich- Doctor of Pedagogical Sciences, member of the New York Academy of Sciences, corresponding member of the Russian Academy of Natural Sciences, member of the Academy of Social Education, and corresponding member of the European Academy of Natural Sciences.
