= Nöjesguiden =

Swedish young adult magazine

Nöjesguiden (Swedish for "the entertainment guide") is a Nordic free-of-charge young adult monthly magazine, available in the major cities in Sweden, which was established in 1982.

It is also published in a similar format In Finland under the name City-lehti and in Norway under the name Natt og Dag.

== Editors-in-chief ==
- 1982 – 1991 Ajje Ljungberg (founder)
- 1991 – 1995 Mattias Hansson (Stockholm)
- 1991 – 1994 Johan Croneman (Gothenburg/Malmö)
- 1991 – 1995 Martin Theander (Malmö/Gothenburg)
- 1994 –1996 Clara Mannheimer
- 1996 – 1999 Martin Jönsson
- 1999 – 2007 Daniel Sparr
- 2007 – 2008 Hannes Dükler
- 2008 – 2013 Margret Atladottir
- 2013 – 2015 Amat Levin
- 2015 – 2018 Jenny Nordlander
- 2018 – Pelle Tamleht
