= Pushkin Museum =

Museum of European art in Moscow

Pushkin State Museum of Fine Arts
- Государственный музей изобразительных искусств имени А. С. Пушкина

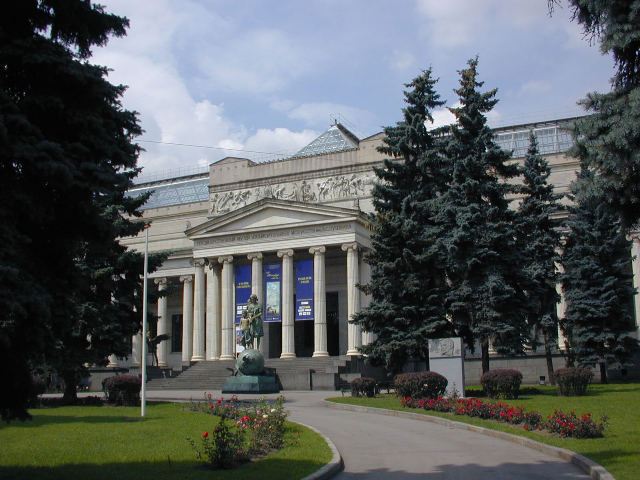
- Pushkin Museum of Fine Arts
- Interactive fullscreen map
- Established: 1912
- Location: 12, Volkhonka Street, Khamovniki, Moscow, Russia
- Coordinates: 55°44′49″N 37°36′22″E
- Type: Art museum
- Founder: Ivan Tsvetaev
- Director: Olga Galaktionova
- Public transit access: Kropotkinskaya
- Website: pushkinmuseum.art

The Pushkin State Museum of Fine Arts (Russian: Государственный музей изобразительных искусств имени А. С. Пушкина, romanized: Gosudarstvennyy muzey izobrazitel'nykh iskusstv imeni A. S. Pushkina, abbreviated as Russian: ГМИИ, GMII) is the largest museum of European art in Moscow. It is located in Volkhonka street, just opposite the Cathedral of Christ the Saviour. The International musical festival Sviatoslav Richter's December Nights has been held in the Pushkin Museum since 1981.

== Etymology ==
Despite its name, the museum has no direct association with the Russian poet Alexander Pushkin, other than as a posthumous commemoration. The facility was founded by professor Ivan Tsvetaev (director of Rumyantsev Museum, and father of the poet Marina Tsvetaeva) in 1912. Tsvetaev persuaded the millionaire and philanthropist Yuriy Nechaev-Maltsov and the architect Roman Klein of the urgent need to give Moscow a fine arts museum. After going through a number of name changes (it was founded as "Alexander III Museum", to honor Emperor Alexander III of Russia), particularly in the transition to the Soviet era and the return of the Russian capital to Moscow, the museum was finally renamed to honour Pushkin in 1937, the 100th anniversary of his death.

== History ==
During the Bolshevik Revolution, works by French impressionists and modern artists were confiscated and then exhibited in the Hermitage Museum in Saint Petersburg before being privately stored. In 2019, those works reappeared and some of them rejoined the Pushkin museum. In 1981, the museum held the Moscow-Paris exhibition. In 2016, art historians discovered 59 Italian Renaissance sculptures in the Pushkin Museum that had been missing from Berlin's collections since the Second World War.

In March 2022, a number of museum officials, including deputy directors, resigned to protest against Russia's invasion of Ukraine.

== Building ==
The building of the Pushkin State Museum of Fine Arts was designed by Roman Klein and Vladimir Shukhov. Construction lasted from 1898 until early 1912, with Ivan Rerberg heading structural engineering effort on the museum site for the first 12 years.

In 2008, President Dmitri A. Medvedev announced plans for a $177 million restoration. A 22 billion rubles ($670 million) expansion, developed by Norman Foster in collaboration with local architectural firm Mosproject-5, was confirmed in 2009, but became mired in disputes with officials and preservationists and concern grew that it would not be completed on schedule for 2018. After Moscow's chief architect Sergei Kuznetsov issued an ultimatum, demanding that Foster take a more active role in the project and prove his commitment by coming to the Russian capital within a month, Norman Foster's firm resigned from the project in 2013. In 2014, Russian architect Yuri Grigoryan, and his firm Project Meganom, were chosen to take over the project. Grigoryan's design provides new modern buildings and, following the protest of heritage groups who campaigned to save the pre-revolutionary architecture, preserves the historic 1930s gas station near the Pushkin's main building inside a glass structure.

== Collection ==
The holdings of the Pushkin State Museum of Fine Arts currently include around 700,000 paintings, sculptures, drawings, applied works, photographs, and archaeological and animalistic objects.

=== Painting ===
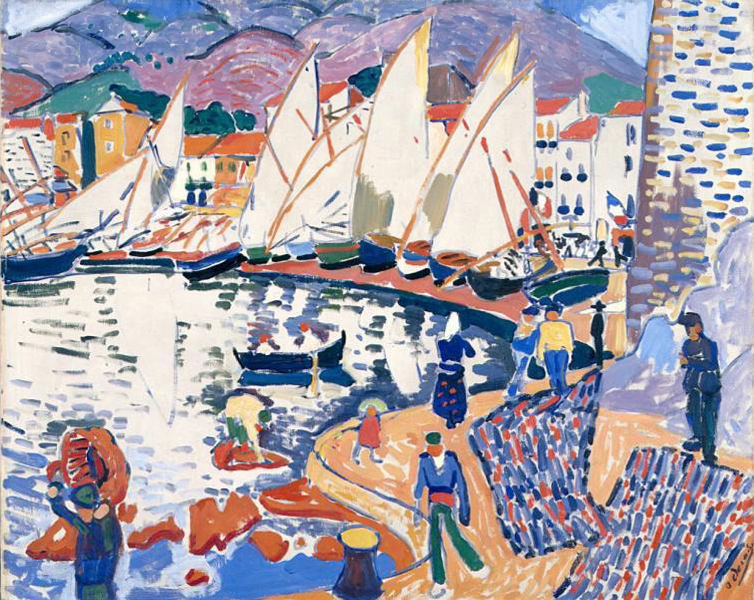
André Derain, 1905, Le séchage des voiles (The Drying Sails), oil on canvas, 82 x 101 cm. Exhibited at the 1905 Salon d'Automne.

The earliest monuments from the museum collection are pieces of Byzantine art: mosaics and icons. The early stage of development of Western European painting is represented by a relatively small collection of Italian Primitives. The hall of early Italian art was opened on October 10, 1924.

=== Graphic art ===
The Department of Prints and Drawings was founded in 1924, when the museum received the holdings of the Printing Cabinet of the Moscow Public and Rumyantsev Museum. In 1861, Alexander II made a valuable gift to the Printing Cabinet: the Moscow Public and Rumyantsev Museum received more than 20,000 prints from the Hermitage.

=== Sculpture ===
The collection of Western European sculptures includes more than 600 pieces. The museum has expanded its holdings over the years and currently owns artworks from the 6th-21st centuries. The first artifacts presented to the Museum of Fine Arts were sculptures from Mikhail Schekin's collections. After the revolution, the museum received sculptures from nationalized collections.

=== Collection of decorative art pieces (Department of the Old Masters) ===
The collection of decorative art pieces from Europe includes around 2,000 items. The earliest are from the Middle Ages, and the set as a whole is very diverse.

=== Archaeological collection ===
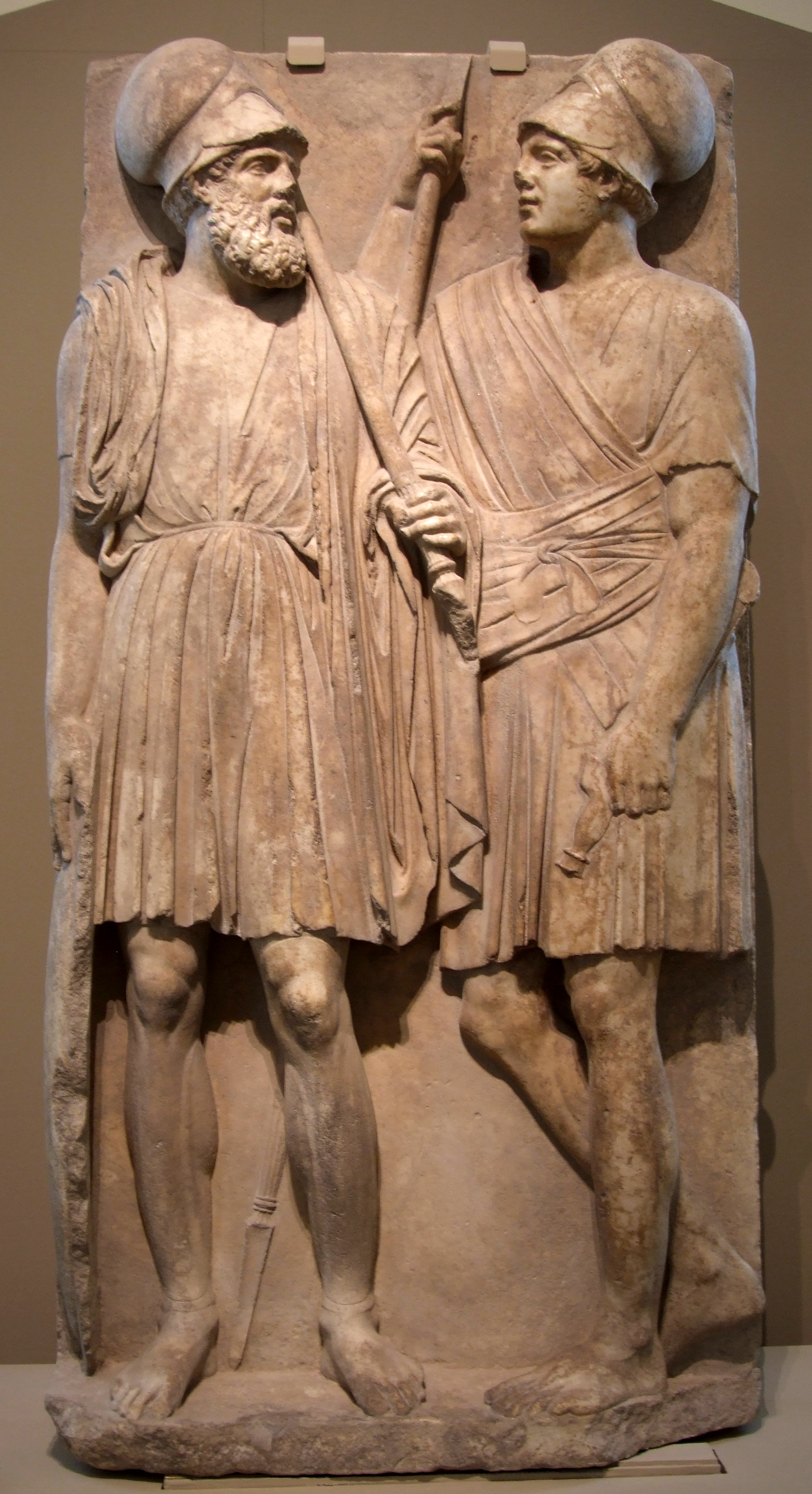
Stele with two Hellenistic soldiers of the Bosporan Kingdom; from Taman Peninsula (Yubileynoe), southern Russia, 3rd quarter of the 4th century BC; marble, Pushkin Museum

The Museum of Fine Arts was intended primarily as a museum of classical arts. Ancient artifacts were the core and the main components of its collection, and the Department of Antiquity was one of the three major scientific departments. Its founder and director, Ivan Tsvetaev (1847-1913), was an expert in ancient art, as were his closest associates, Vladimir Malmberg (1860-1921) and Nikolay Scherbakov (1884-1933).

==== Egypt ====
Most of the objects presented in Hall No. 1 have been on display since the museum opening in 1912 and come from the collection of Vladimir Golenishchev (1856-1947).

==== Ancient civilizations ====
The museum holdings of genuine artifacts of Southwest Asia are based on the collection of Russian Orientalist and Egyptologist Vladimir Golenishchev.

==== Antiquity ====
The antique collection of the Pushkin State Museum of Fine Arts includes many genuine artifacts: more than 1,000 vessels, small plastic pieces, and sculptures.

==== Tsvetaev's collection of casts ====
The collection of casts and copies, typical for European museums of the nineteenth century, is unique today in its preservation and consistency. With a similar cohesiveness, Tsvetaev wanted to present plastic art of the modern era and complete the collection with casts made from contemporary sculptures, where Auguste Rodin's works would take the central place.

=== Numismatic collection ===
Today, the holdings of the Numismatics Department of the Pushkin State Museum of Fine Arts form a collection in excess of 200,000 items and 3,000 volumes of the special library. It was started at Imperial Moscow University. In 1888, the collection was divided and formed the basis for the major numismatic collections of Moscow that belonged to the Historical Museum and the Alexander III Fine Arts Museum.

Since 1912, objects of ancient and Western European numismatics from the university collection were transferred to the Sculpture Department of the Fine Arts Museum and mostly kept packaged. By June 1925, museum custodians had grouped together a number of cases with coins, medals, and casts and created the Numismatic Cabinet located on the balcony of the White Hall. In 1945, the museum's Numismatic Cabinet became an independent department. It includes archaeological material from Central Asia, such as a hoard of Kushano-Sasanian coins acquired in 2002.

== Museum Quarter ==
The work on the Museum Quarter of the Pushkin State Museum of Fine Arts started in the late 2000s. In 2019–23, the Main Building of the Pushkin State Museum of Fine Arts will be reconstructed.

== Gallery ==
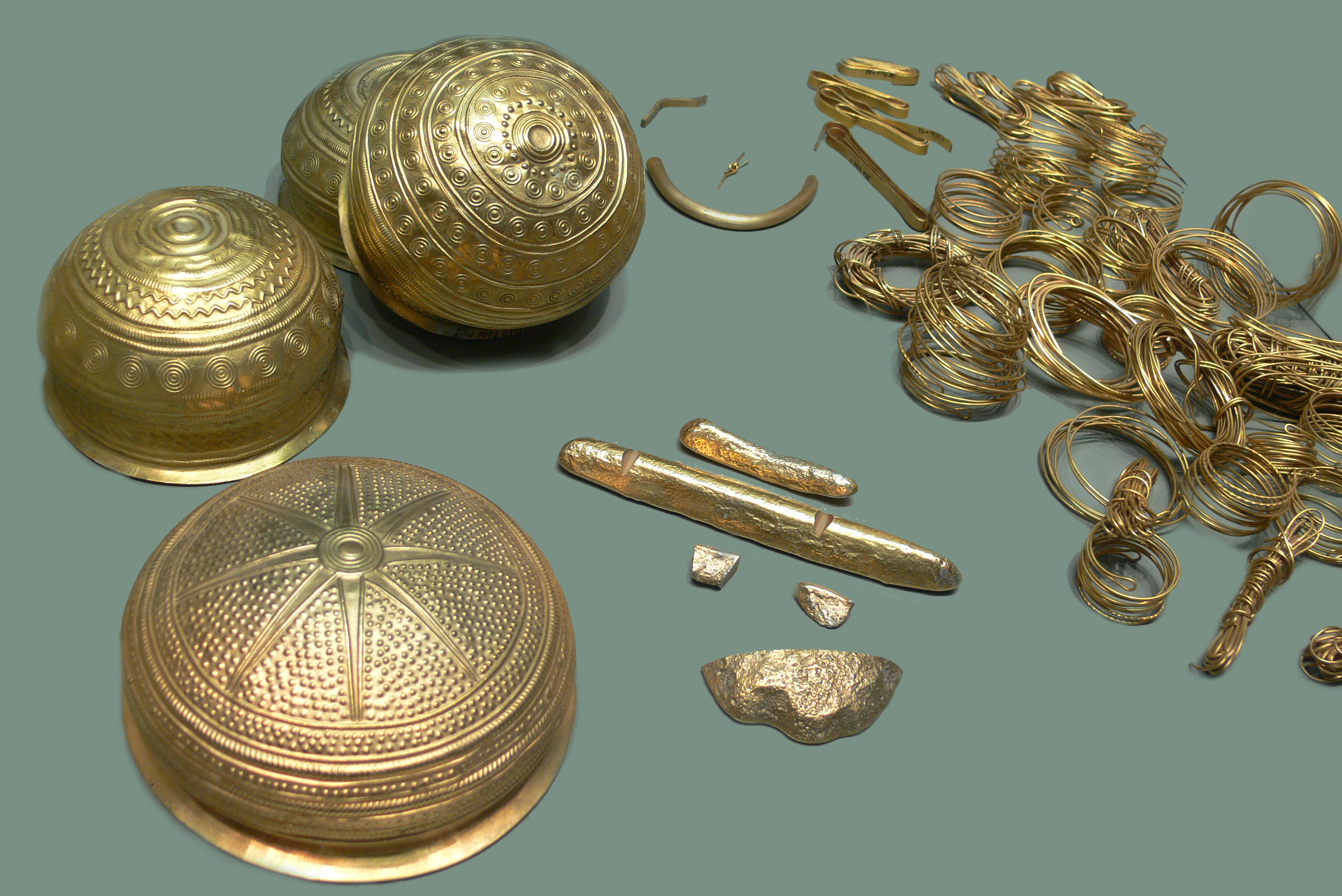
Eberswalde Hoard

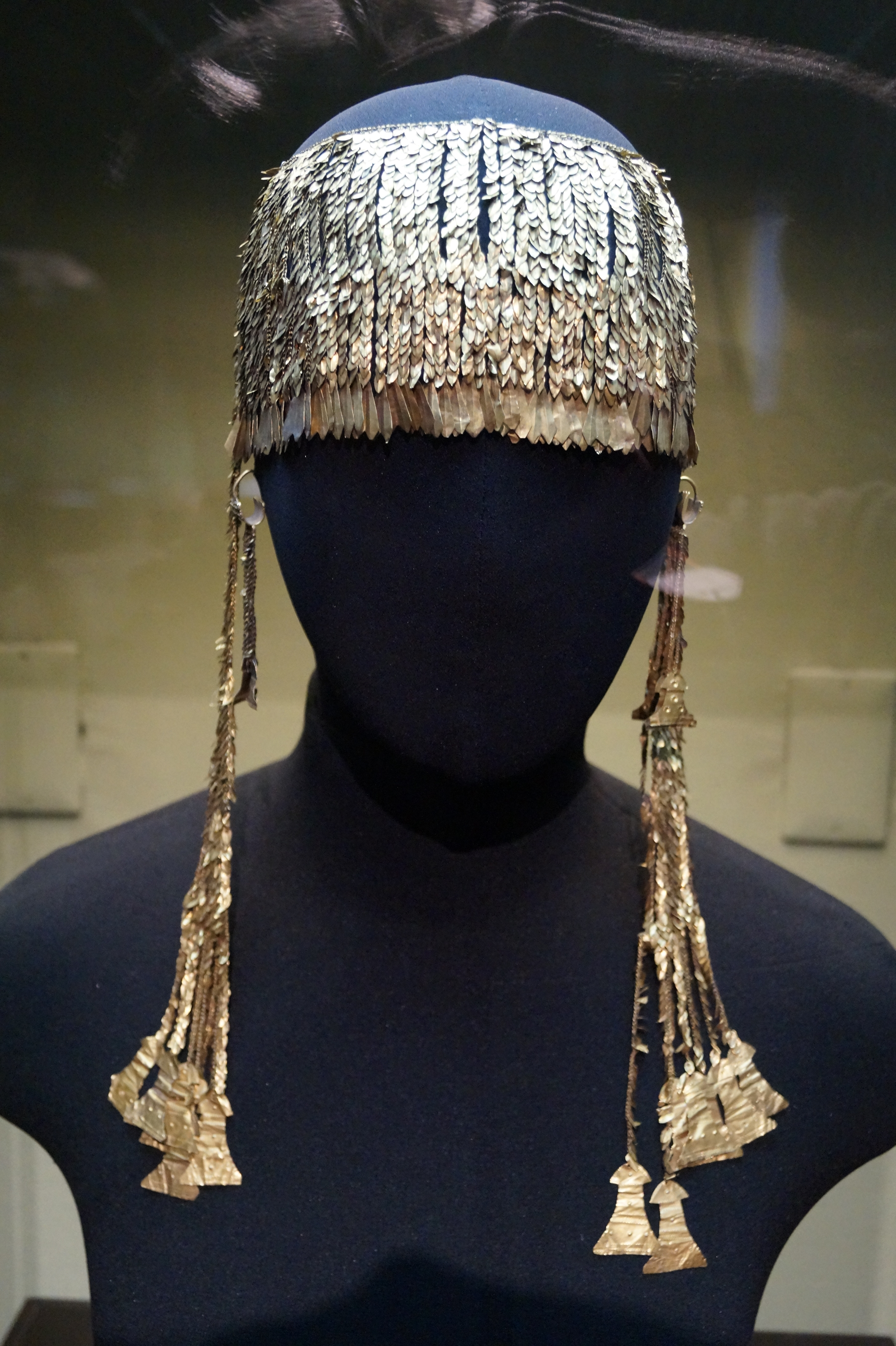
Priam's Treasure

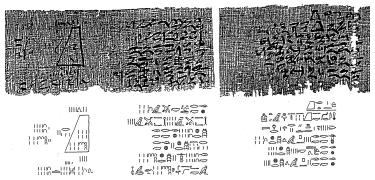
The Moscow Mathematical Papyrus

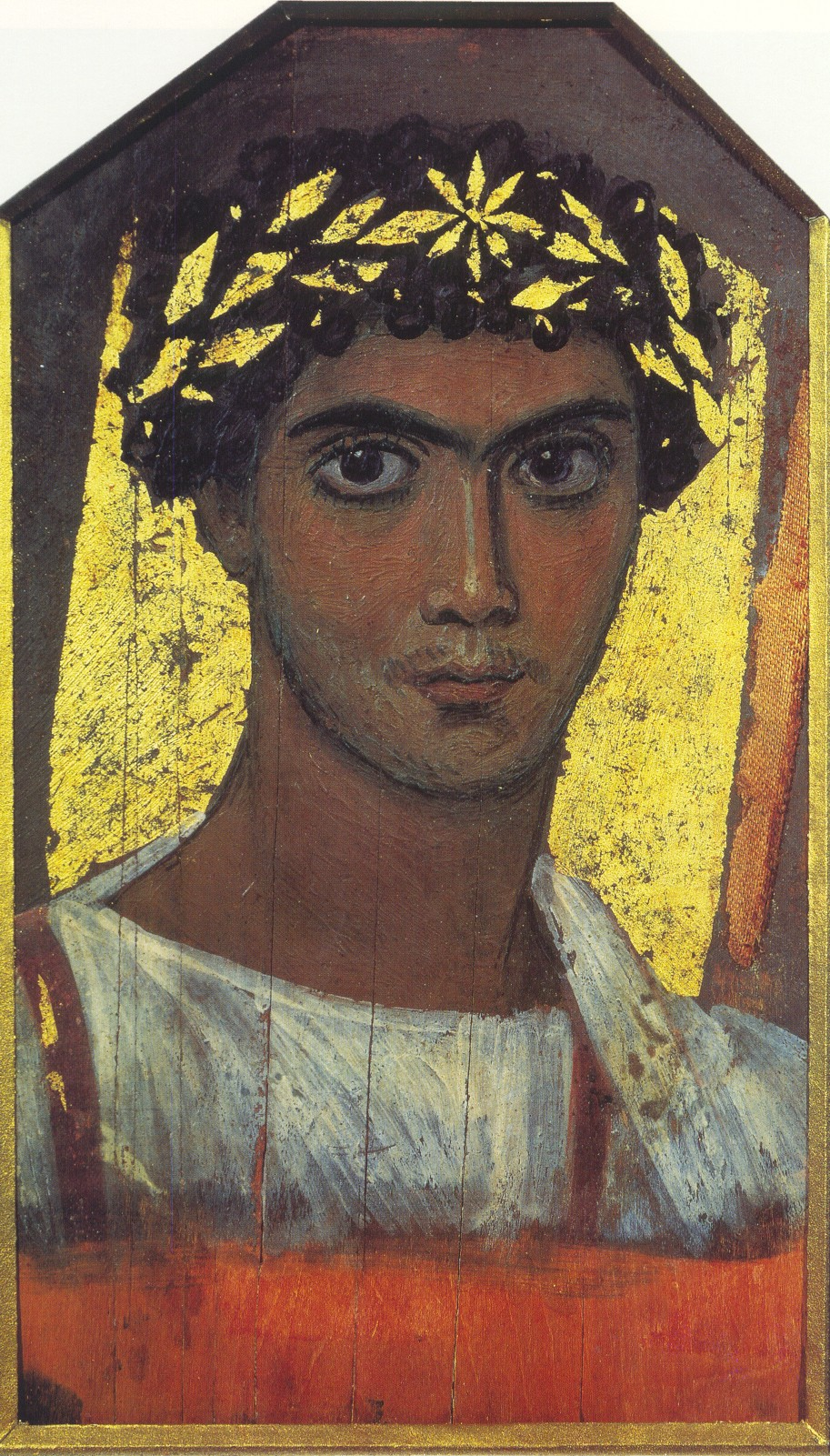
Fayum mummy portraits

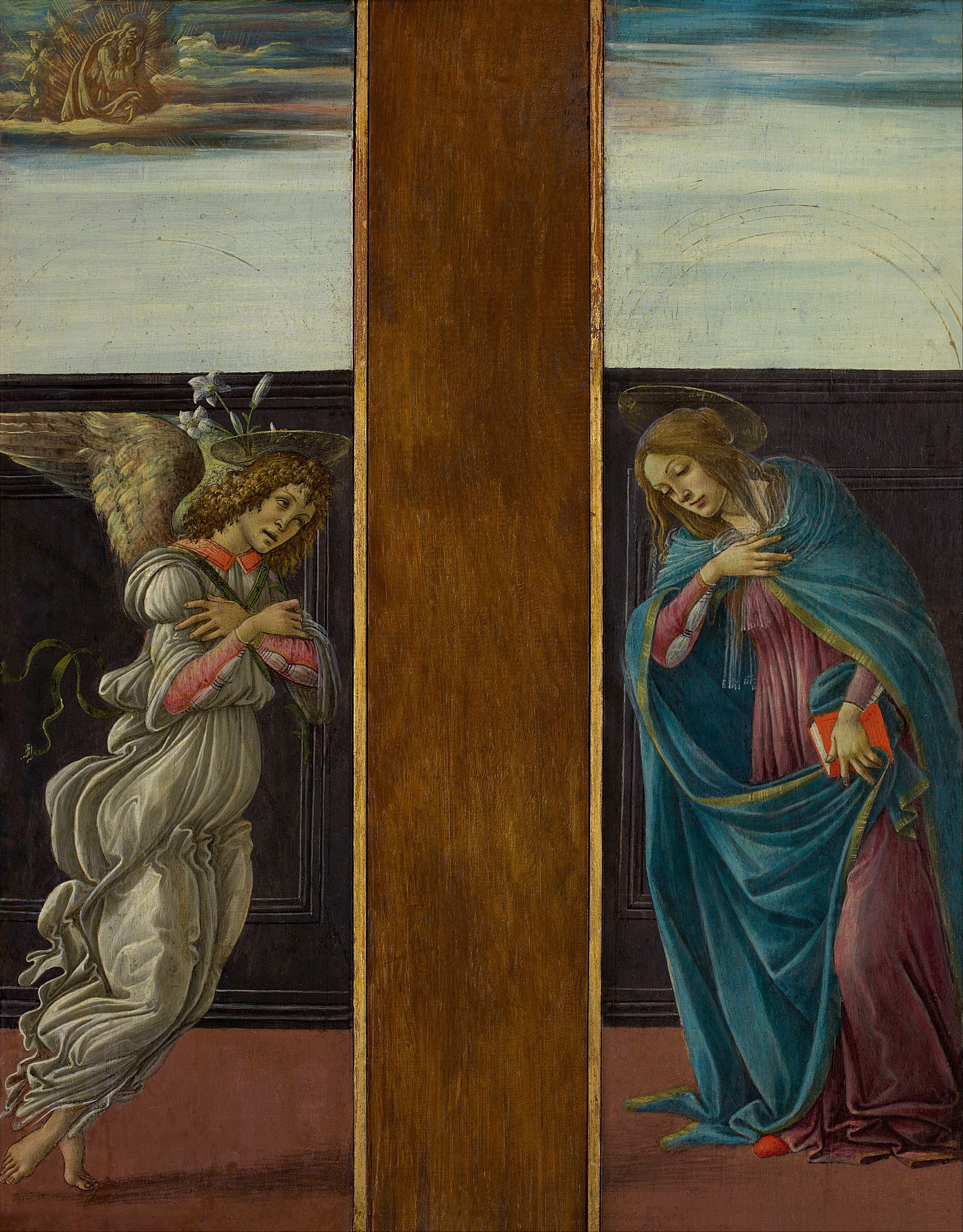
Annunciation by Sandro Botticelli, c. 1495-1498

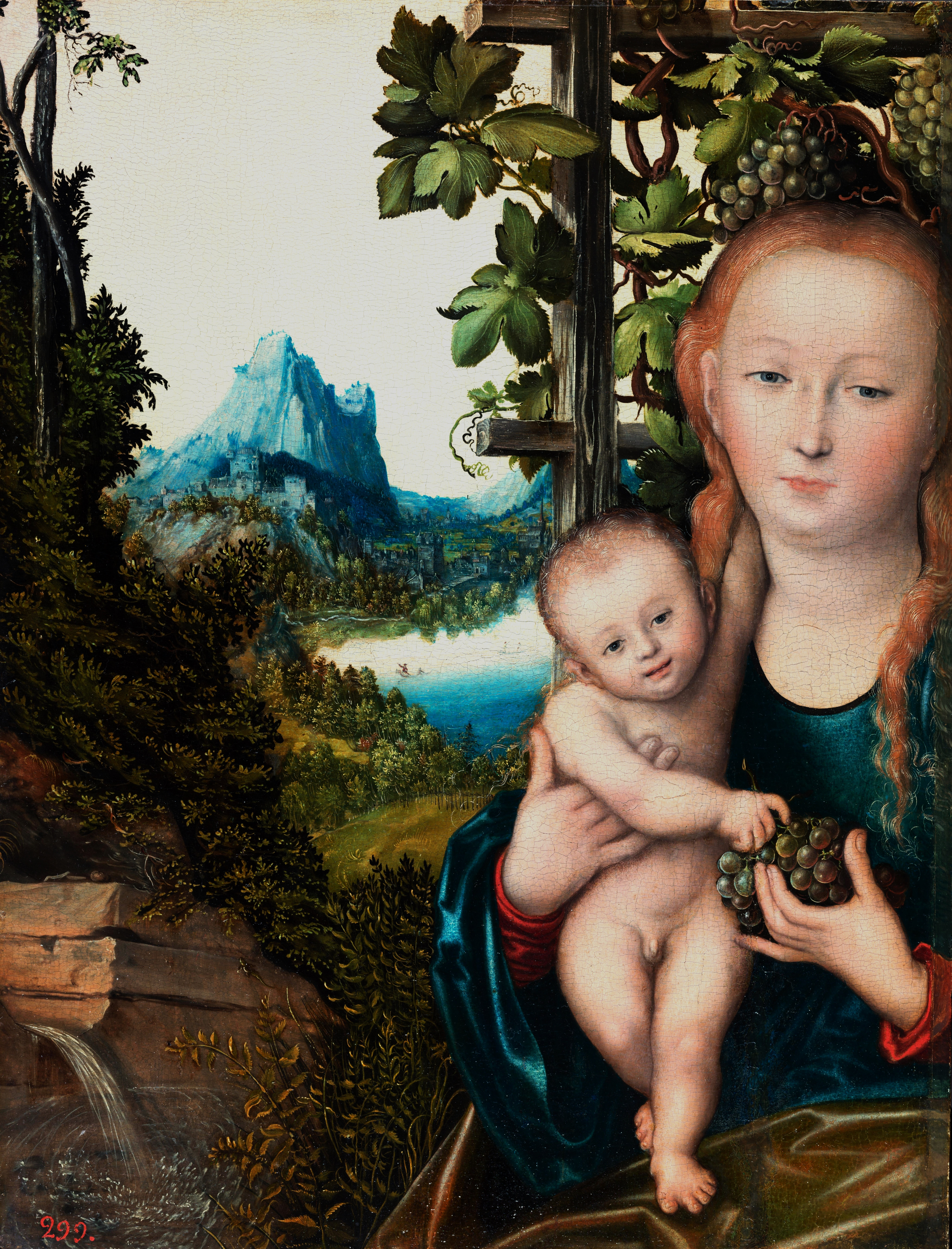
Madonna and a Child by Lucas Cranach the Elder, c. 1520

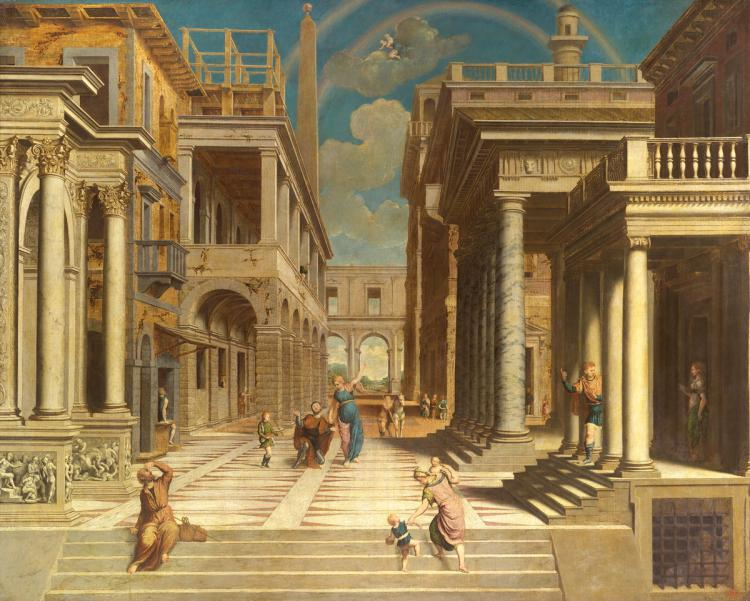
Apparition of the Sybil to the emperor Augustus by Paris Bordone, c. 1550

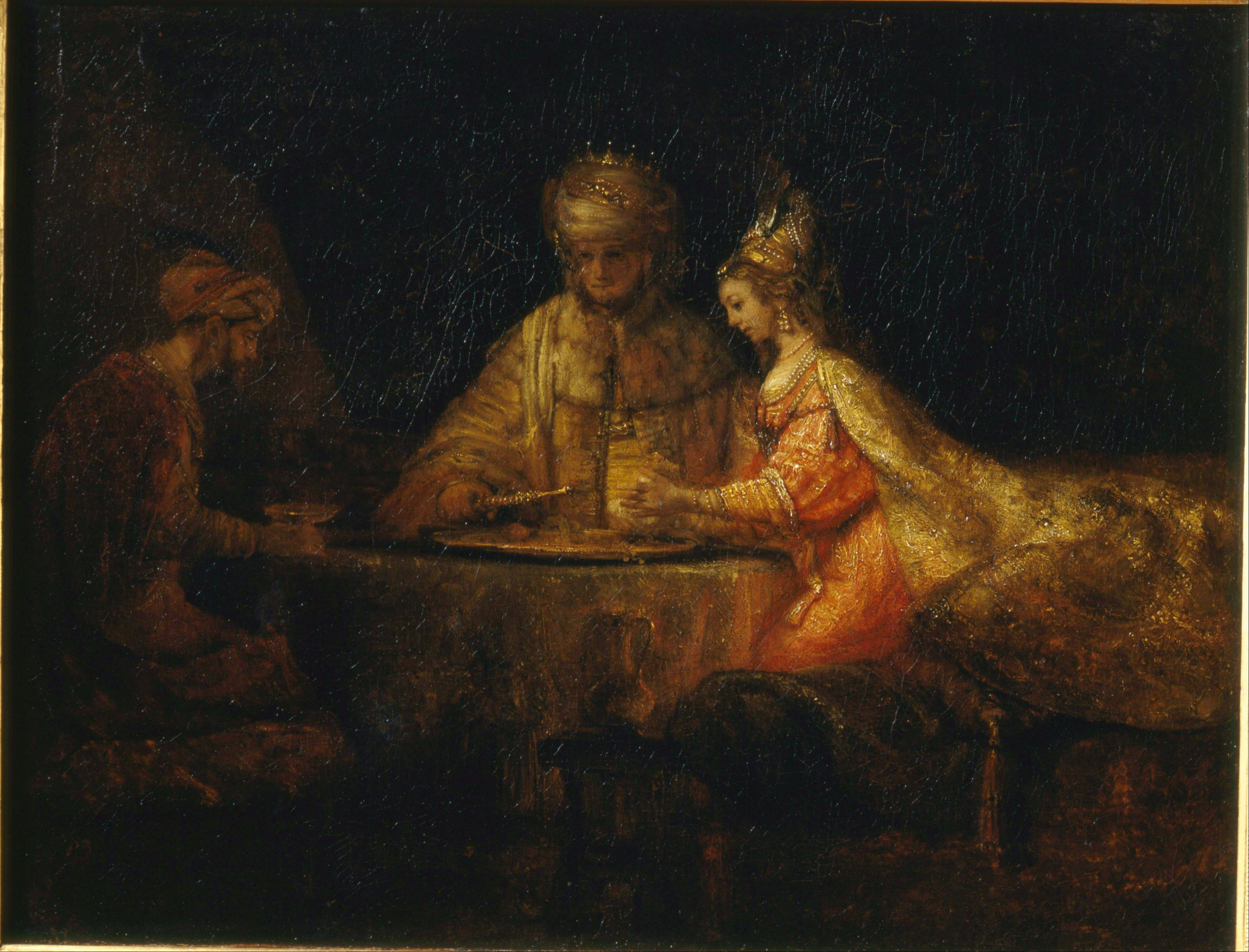
Ahasuerus and Haman at the Feast of Esther by Rembrandt, 1660

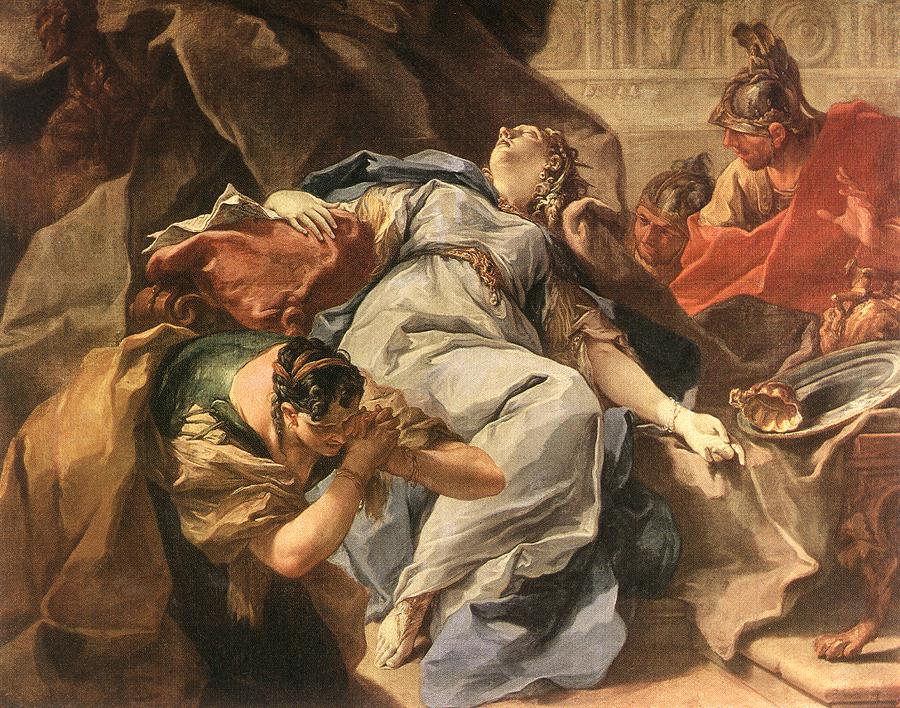
Death of Sophonisba by Giambattista Pittoni, first half of the 18th century

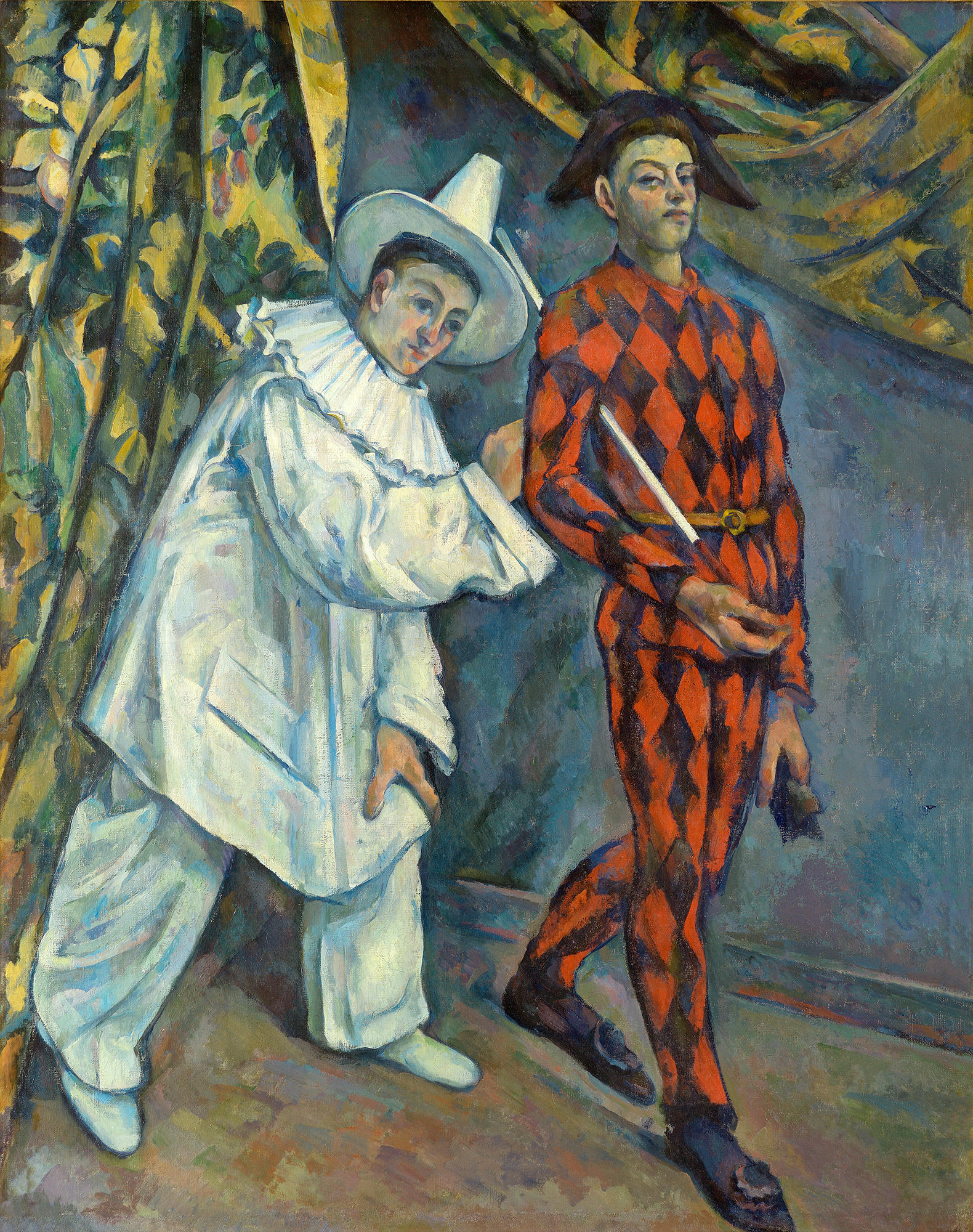
Fastnacht (Mardi Gras) by Paul Cézanne, 1888

The Night Cafe, Arles by Paul Gauguin, 1888

The Red Vineyard by Vincent van Gogh, 1888, only van Gogh painting sold in his lifetime

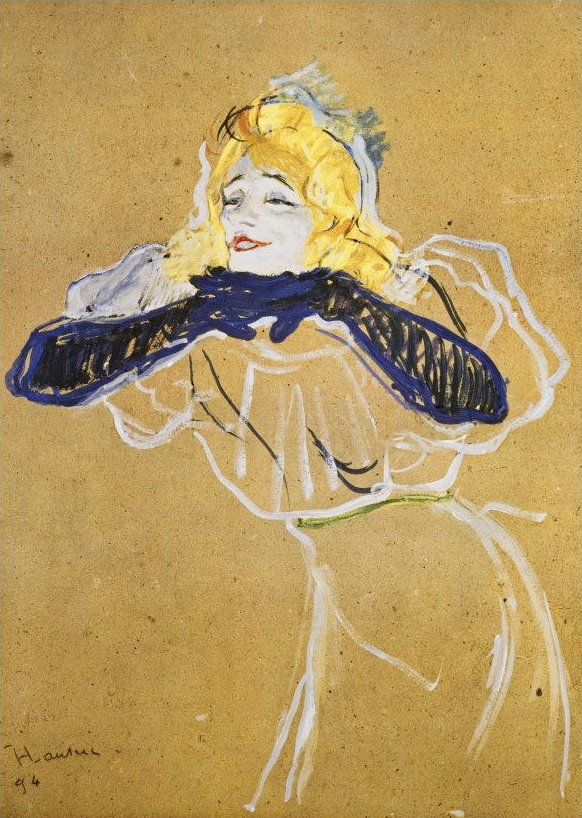
Yvette Guilbert by Henri de Toulouse-Lautrec, 1894

Blue Dancers by Edgar Degas, 1897

Acrobat on a Ball by Pablo Picasso, 1905

== Directors ==
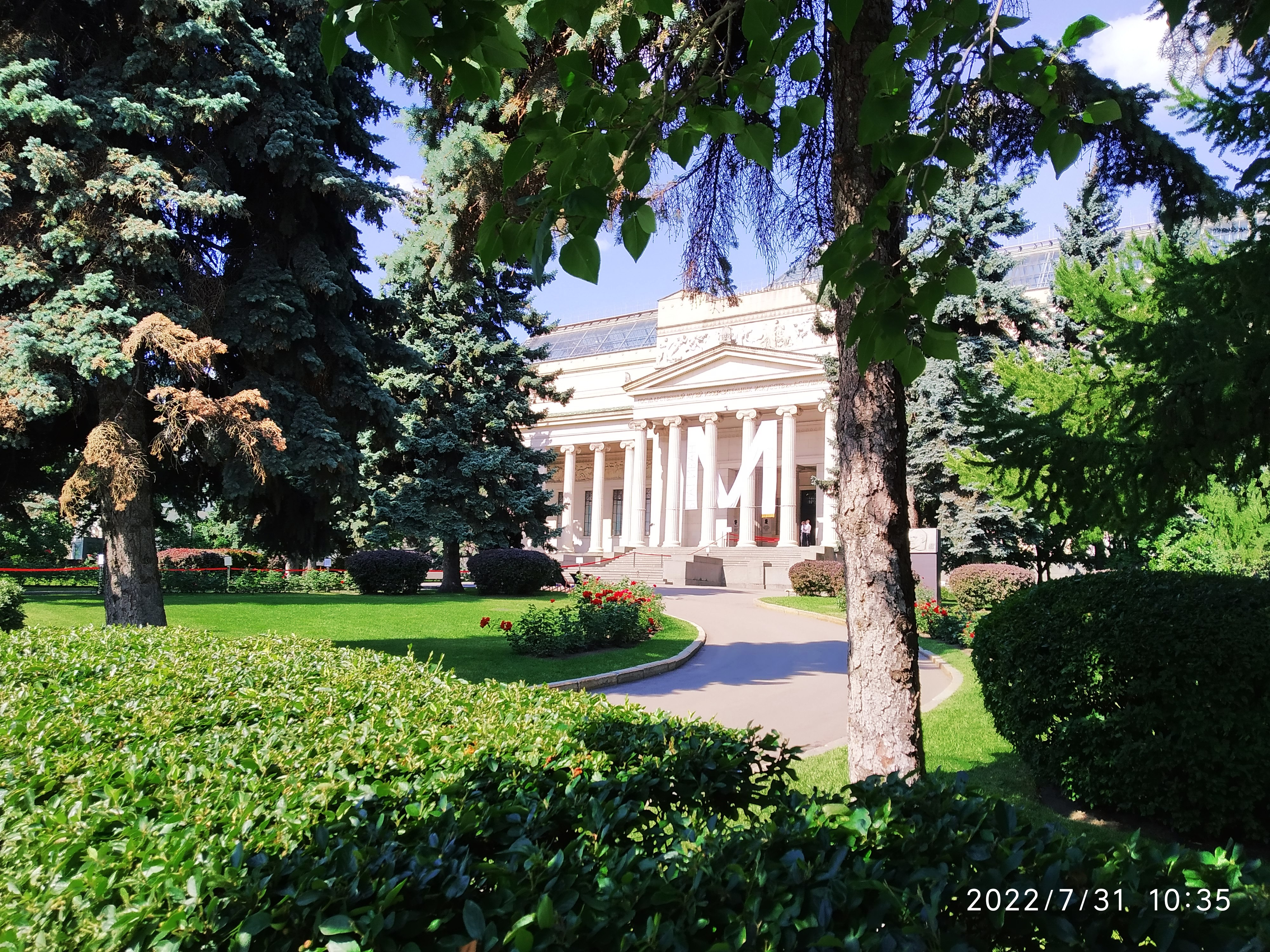
Exterior views of the Pushkin Museum in 2022

- 1911—1913 — Ivan Tsvetaev
- 1913—1921 — Vladimir Konstantinovich Malmberg
- 1921—1923 — Vladimir Egorovich Giatsintov
- 1923—1928 — Nikolai Ilyich Romanov
- 1928—1929 — Fyodor Ilyin
- 1929—1932 — Vyacheslav Pavlovich Polonsky
- 1932—1933 — Boris Evgenievich Etingof
- 1933—1935 — Joseph Moiseevich Byk—Bek
- 1935—1936 — Alexey Nikolaevich Vasiliev
- 1936—1939 — Vladimir Eifert
- 1939—1944 — Ivan Ivanovich Korotkov
- 1941—1942 — Vera Krylova
- 1944—1950 — Sergey Dmitrievich Merkurov
- 1950—1954 — Nikolay Slonevsky
- 1954—1961 — Alexander Ivanovich Zamoshkin
- 1961—2013 — Irina Antonova
- 2013-March 2023 — Marina Loshak
- 2023—2025 — Elizaveta Stanislavovna Likhacheva
- 2025—now — Olga Nikolaevna Galaktionova
