= Gedin =

Gedin is a surname. Notable people with this surname include:

- Jessika Gedin, (born 1970), Swedish book publisher and radio/television presenter
- Linda Gedin, also known as Linda Thelenius (born 1974), Swedish model and singer
- Per I. Gedin (born 1928), Swedish publisher and writer
