= Andy Blythe and Marten Joustra =

British composing duo

Andy Blythe and Marten Joustra are British composers who have collaborated on various TV, production music and game projects as part of their company, Swallow Studios. Their specialty is jazz, although they have also written in other genres. They are also known as Blythe Joustra.

== Career ==
Blythe and Joustra have been composing music together for 25 years, and in that time they have composed over 1,000 pieces of music for television, radio, film, games, production music libraries, and video. Joustra's background is as a classically trained pianist. He is a jazz pianist and has played in a variety of orchestras, rock bands, jazz quartets and a TV House band.

Blythe's background is in recording and production. Having started out as a drummer in various rock and pop bands, he opened and ran a commercial recording studio. It was through this that he and Joustra met. They quickly established a mutual ambition to write music for television and initially gained experience composing soundtracks for corporate videos, radio commercials, and live events. Since then, they have contributed tracks to over 40 library music albums and written themes and incidental music for clients all over the world.

Aside from movies and video game music, they wrote music and songs for the UK TV show Dick & Dom in da Bungalow, which aired between 2002 and 2006. A soundtrack CD of this music was released. The tune "Good Evening and Welcome" appeared on the Swedish TV series Ursäkta röran (vi bygger om) by Filip Hammar and Fredrik Wikingsson. They have also written music for OOglies.

== List of works ==
=== Video games ===
| Year | Title | Notes |
|---|---|---|
| 1994 | Mickey Mania | With Matt Furniss and Michael Giacchino |
| 1995 | Toy Story | |
| 1997 | Formula 1 97 | |
| 1998 | Rascal | |
| 1998 | A Bug's Life | |
| 1999 | Toy Story 2: Buzz Lightyear to the Rescue | |
| 2000 | Muppet RaceMania | |
| 2001 | Crash Bandicoot: The Wrath of Cortex | |
| 2002 | Haven: Call of the King | |
| 2003 | Finding Nemo | |
| 2005 | Peter Pan: The Legend of Never Land | |

=== Film/TV ===
| Year | Title |
|---|---|
| 1998 | Waffle |
| 1998 | A Date with Fate |
| 1998 | The World's Greatest Magic 5 |
| 1998 | The Naked Eye |
| 1999–present | Tonight |
| 2002–2006 | Dick & Dom in da Bungalow |
| 2003–2009 | How Clean Is Your House? |
| 2006–2014 | The Slammer |
| 2007 | Harry Batt |
| 2007 | Chute! |
| 2007–2009 | Mister Maker |
| 2009 | Da Dick and Dom Dairies |
| 2009 | My Last Five Girlfriends |
| 2009–2011 | The Legend of Dick and Dom |
| 2009–2015 | OOglies |
| 2009–2015 | I Can Cook |
| 2011 | The Night Clerk |
| 2012 | Hoopla |
| 2012 | Diddy Movies |
| 2012–present | Let's Play |
| 2012–present | The Martin Lewis Money Show |
| 2013 | Jack the Ripper |
| 2014–2017 | The Furchester Hotel |
| 2017–present | Saturday Mash-Up! |
| 2018 | My World Kitchen |
| 2019 | The Tez O'Clock Show |
| 2020 | How 3 |
