= Hollender =

Hollender is a surname. Notable people with the surname include:

- Marc Hollender (1916–1998), American psychiatrist
- Jeffrey Hollender (born 1954), American businessman and writer
- Pål Hollender (born 1968), Swedish film director
- Tadeusz Hollender (1910–1943), Polish poet, translator and humorist
