= Grattis världen =

- Presented by: Filip Hammar and Fredrik Wikingsson
- Theme music composer: Lars Bygdén
- Country of origin: Sweden
- Original language: Swedish
- No. of seasons: 1
- No. of episodes: 10

Production
- Executive producer: Per Blankens
- Producer: Pontus Gårdinger
- Running time: 45
- Production company: In Living Color / EFTI

Original release
- Network: Kanal 5
- Release: 11 September – 14 November 2005

Grattis världen ("Congratulations the World") is a television program in which Filip Hammar & Fredrik Wikingsson travel around the world to exotic countries and try unusual and often quite adventurous things. The general plot is quite similar to High Chaparall as Filip and Fredrik interview eccentric people they meet along the way.

Performance artist Pål Hollender, of Swedish Survivor fame, worked on the show as a producer and is seen on camera in several episodes. Some argue he was hired in an effort to promote the show.

The Song The Passenger by Iggy Pop is used as the theme song for the show (though in a cover version by Lars Bygdén).

== Episode overview ==
Season 1:

Episode #	Running time	Visiting	First aired
Episode 1	45 min	New Zealand	11 September 2005
Episode 2	45 min	South Africa	18 September 2005
Episode 3	45 min	Greenland	25 September 2005
Episode 4	45 min	Tokyo	2 October 2005
Episode 5	45 min	Albania	3 October 2005
Episode 6	45 min	Cook Islands	10 October 2005
Episode 7	45 min	Dover - Calais	17 October 2005
Episode 8	45 min	Japan's countryside	24 October 2005
Episode 9	45 min	Ibiza	7 November 2005
Episode 10	45 min	Estonia	14 November 2005
