= List of roles and awards of Pamela Anderson =

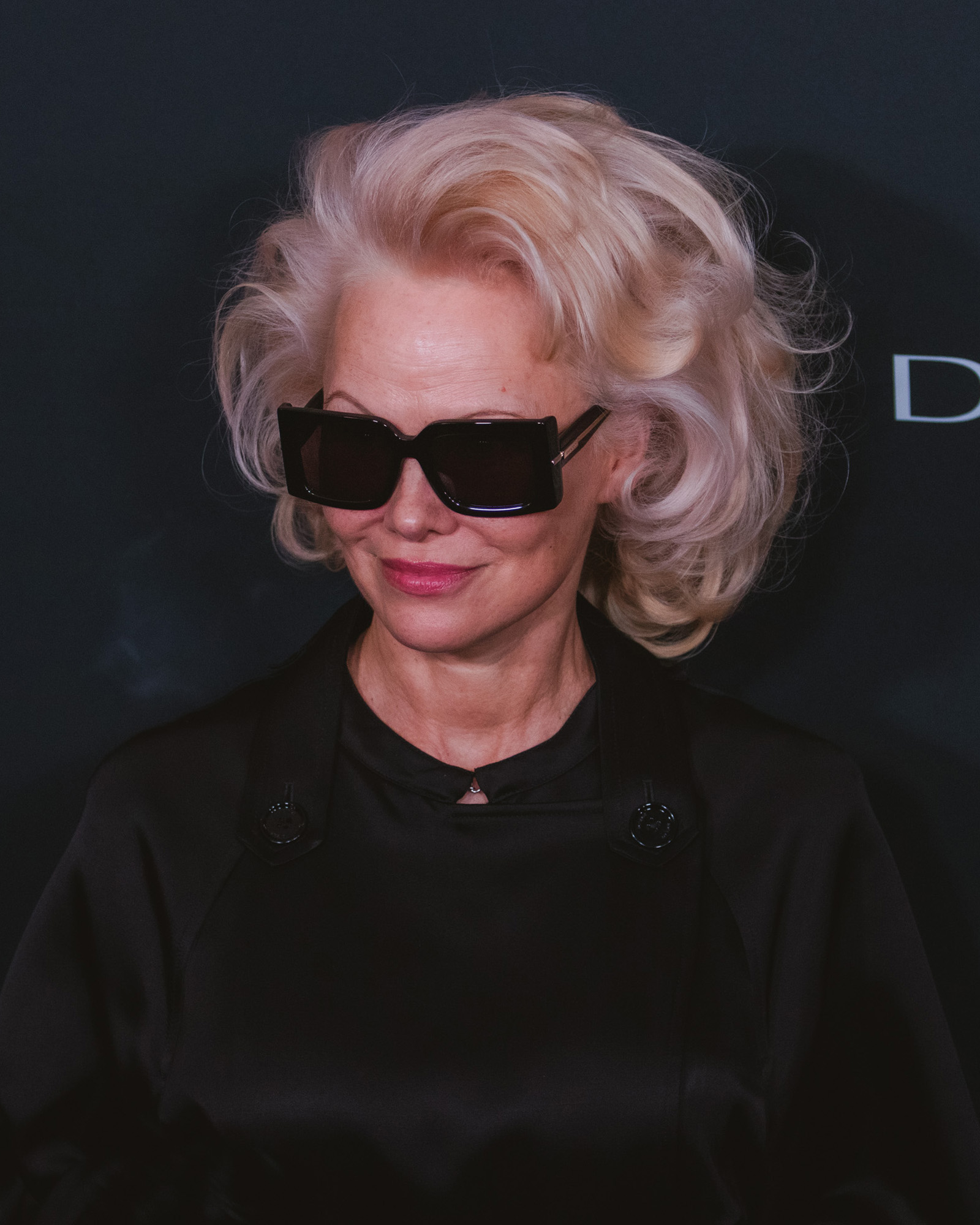
Anderson in 2026

Pamela Anderson is a Canadian-American actress, model and media personality. She is most acclaimed for her performance in Gia Coppola's The Last Showgirl (2024).

== Filmography ==
=== Film ===
Year	Title	Role	Notes
1991	The Taking of Beverly Hills	Cheerleader	
1993	Snapdragon	Felicity	
1994	Raw Justice	Sarah	
1995	Baywatch the Movie: Forbidden Paradise	Casey Jean "C.J." Parker	Video
1996	Barb Wire	Barbara 'Barb Wire' Kopetski	
1996	Naked Souls	Britt	
2002	Scooby-Doo	Herself	
2003	Scary Movie 3	Becca	
2003	Pauly Shore Is Dead	Herself	
2005	No Rules	Herself	
2006	Borat	Herself	
2008	Blonde and Blonder	Dee Twiddle	
2008	Superhero Movie	Invisible Girl	
2010	Costa Rican Summer	Herself	
2010	Hollywood & Wine	Jennifer Mary	Video
2010	The Commuter Julia	Female Guest In Hotel	Short
2013	Jackhammer	Groupie	
2015	What Are Men Doing! 2	Herself	
2015	Connected	Jackie	Short
2016	The People Garden	Signe	
2016	Don't Be a Derk	Jackie	Short
2017	Baywatch	Casey Jean 'C.J.' Parker	
2017	The Institute	Ann Williams	
2017	SPF-18	Herself	
2018	Nicky Larson et le parfum de Cupidon	Jessica Fox	
2022	Alone at Night	Sheriff Rodgers	
2024	The Last Showgirl	Shelly Gardner	
2025	The Naked Gun	Beth Davenport	
2026	Rosebush Pruning	The Mother	
2026	Place to Be	Molly	
TBA	Alma		Post-production
TBA	Love Is Not the Answer	Jean Harper	Post-production
TBA	Somedays	Carrol	Post-production

=== Television ===
Year	Title	Role	Notes
1990	Family Feud	Herself/Celebrity Contestant	Recurring guest
1990	Charles in Charge	Chris	Episode: "Teacher's Pest"
1990	Married... with Children	Yvette	Episode: "Al... with Kelly"
1991	Married People	Terri	Episode: "The Nanny"
1991	Top of the Heap	Romona	Episode: "Behind the Eight Ball"
1991	Married... with Children	Cashew	Episode: "Route 666: Part 2"
1991–1997	Home Improvement	Lisa	Recurring cast (season 1-2), guest (season 6)
1992	Home Again with Bob Vila	Herself	Episode: "Final House Tour - Malibu, CA Beach House"
1992	Days of Our Lives	Cindy	2 episodes
1992–1997	Baywatch	Casey Jean "C.J." Parker	Main cast (season 3-7)
1993	What's Up Doc?	Herself	Episode: "Sex Symbols"
1994	This Is Your Life	Herself	Episode: "David Hasselhoff"
1994	Come Die with Me: A Mickey Spillane's Mike Hammer Mystery	Velda	TV movie
1997	The Nanny	Heather Biblow-Imperiali	Recurring cast (season 4)
1997	Saturday Night Live	Herself/Host	Episode: "Pamela Lee/Rollins Band"
1998–2002	V.I.P.	Vallery Irons	Main cast
1999	Sin City Spectacular	Herself	Episode #1.21
1999	Andi Meets...	Herself	Episode: "Britney Spears"
1999	Ruby	Herself	Episode: "Pamela Anderson Lee"
1999	Futurama	Herself/Dixie (voice)	Episode: "A Fishful of Dollars" & "Fry and the Slurm Factory"
1999–2003	Hollywood Squares	Herself	Recurring guest
2001	Bravo Profiles	Herself	Episode: "RuPaul"
2001	The Test	Herself/Panelist	Episode: "The Bedroom Etiquette Test"
2001	Top Ten	Herself	Episode: "Sex Bombs"
2001	Just Shoot Me!	Herself	Episode: "Mayas and Tigers and Deans, Oh My"
2001	2gether: The Series	Herself	Episode: "Jillie"
2001–2009	E! True Hollywood Story	Herself	Recurring guest
2002	King of the Hill	Cyndi (voice)	Episode: "The Fat and the Furious"
2003	Punk'd	Herself	Episode #1.1
2003	CMT Music Awards	Herself/Co-Host	Main co-host
2003	High Chaparall	Herself	Episode: "Pamela Anderson"
2003	Baywatch: Hawaiian Wedding	Casey Jean 'C.J.' Parker	TV movie
2003	Less than Perfect	Vicki Devorski	Episode: "All About Claude"
2003–2004	Stripperella	Erotica "Stripperella" Jones (voice)	Main cast
2005	Comedy Central Roast	Herself	Episode: "Comedy Central Roast of Pamela Anderson"
2005	Biography	Herself	Episode: "David Hasselhoff: Driven"
2005	HeatMeter	Herself	Episode: "Kid Rock vs. Eminem"
2005	Mad TV	Herself	Episode: "Pamela Anderson"
2005	Class of...	Herself	Episode: "1989: Life After Baywatch"
2005	8 Simple Rules	Cheryl	Episode: "C.J.'s Temptation" & "Torn Between Two Lovers"
2005–2006	Stacked	Skyler Dayton	Main cast
2006	Juno Awards	Herself/Host	Main host
2007–2008	The Girls Next Door	Herself	Guest cast (season 3 & 5)
2008	The Sunday Night Project	Herself/Guest Host	Episode #1.2
2008	Big Brother Australia	Herself/House Guest	House guest (season 8)
2008	The Dark Side of Fame with Piers Morgan	Herself	Episode: "Pamela Anderson"
2008	E!'s Pam: Girl on the Loose!	Herself	Main cast
2008	Battleground Earth	Herself	Episode: "Something's Fishy"
2008	Undercover TV	Herself	Episode #1.9
2008	Kath & Kim	Herself	Episode: "Friends"
2009	Whatever Happened To?	Herself	Episode: "Buxom Beauties"
2010	Paramount Studios New Year's Eve Concert	Herself/Host	Main host
2010	Dancing with the Stars	Herself	Contestant (season 10)
2010	Comedy Central Roast	Herself	Episode: "Comedy Central Roast of David Hasselhoff"
2010	Magic Numbers	Herself	Episode #1.6
2010	Gylne tider	Herself	Episode #4.2
2010	Bigg Boss	Herself/House Guest	House guest (season 4)
2010	Chris Moyles' Quiz Night	Herself	Episode: "Chris Moyles' Christmas Quiz Night"
2011	Bailando 2011	Herself	Contestant (season 7)
2011	Big Brother	Herself	Episode: "The Final"
2011	Ushi & The Family	Herself	Episode #1.1
2011	Les Anges	Herself	2 episodes
2011–2017	Celebrity Juice	Herself	Recurring guest
2012	I Get That a Lot	Herself	Episode #1.4
2012	RuPaul's Drag Race	Herself/Guest Judge	Episode: "Frenemies"
2012	Dancing with the Stars	Herself/Contestant	Contestant (season 15)
2012	VIP Brother	Herself/House Guest	House guest (season 4)
2012	Yalan Dünya	Herself	Episode: "9. Bölüm"
2013	Dancing on Ice	Herself/Contestant	Contestant (season 8)
2013	Promi Big Brother	Herself/House Guest	House guest (season 1)
2013	Package Deal	Dr. Sydney Forbes	Recurring cast (season 1)
2014	World Music Awards	Herself/Co-Host	Main co-host
2015	Big Brother Germany	Herself/House Guest	Episode #12.25
2015	Love Advent	Herself	Episode: "Pamela Anderson"
2016	Gotham Comedy Live	Herself/Host	Episode: "Pamela Anderson"
2016	Jorden runt på 6 steg	Herself	Episode: "Sex steg till Pamela Anderson"
2017	Through the Keyhole	Herself	Episode #4.2
2017	8 Out of 10 Cats	Herself	Episode #20.6
2017	Sur-Vie	Raquel Rose	Main cast
2018	Piers Morgan's Life Stories	Herself	Episode: "Pamela Anderson"
2018	Heathrow: Britain's Busiest Airport	Herself	Episode #4.6
2018	Danse avec les stars	Herself/Contestant	Contestant (season 9)
2018–2019	Match Game	Herself/Celebrity Panelist	Guest panelist (season 3-4)
2019	The Hills: New Beginnings	Herself	Episode #1.1" & "#1.8
2022	Durch die Nacht mit ...	Herself	Episode: "Pamela Anderson und Srecko Horvat"
2022–2023	Pamela's Garden of Eden	Herself/Host	Main host
2025	Pamela's Cooking With Love	Herself/Host	Main host

=== Theatre ===
Year	Title	Role	Venue	Ref.
2022	Chicago	Roxie Hart (replacement)	Ambassador Theater, Broadway	
2025	Camino Real	Marguerite Gautier	Williamstown Theatre Festival	

=== Music videos ===
Year	Title	Artist(s)
1990	"Shelter Me"	Cinderella
1991	"Stranded"	Tangier
1993	"Can't Have Your Cake (and eat it too)"	Vince Neil
1994	"Blind Man"	Aerosmith
1999	"David Duchovny"	Bree Sharp
1999	"Get Naked"	Methods of Mayhem
2000	"Miserable"	Lit
2000	"Hey Papi"	Jay-Z
2002	"You Never Met a Motherfucker Quite Like Me"	Kid Rock
2006	"Touch the Sky"	Kanye West
2006	"God's Gonna Cut You Down"	Johnny Cash
2012	"Glamazon"	RuPaul
2014	"Earth Is the Loneliest Planet"	Morrissey
2016	"Le lac"	Julien Doré

=== Documentary ===
Year	Title	Notes
1995	Playboy: The Best of Pamela Anderson	Herself
2007	I Am an Animal: The Story of Ingrid Newkirk and PETA	Herself
2007	See You in Vegas	Herself
2013	The Carrier	Herself
2015	Unity	Narrator
2018	The Game Changers	Executive Producer
2018	Westwood: Punk, Icon, Activist	Herself
2023	Pamela, a Love Story	Herself
2024	Criterion Closet (November 12)	Herself

== Awards and nominations ==
Organizations	Year (Note: Indicates the year of the ceremony. Each year is linked to the article about the awards held that year, wherever possible.)	Category	Work	Result	Ref.
AARP Movies for Grownups Awards	2025	Best Actress	The Last Showgirl	Nominated	
Austin Film Critics Association	2025	Best Actress	The Last Showgirl	Nominated	
Canadian Business	2005	Most Powerful Canadian in Hollywood	—N/a	Won	
Canada's Walk of Fame	2006	—N/a	—N/a	Won	
Deauville American Film Festival	2025	Talent Award	The Last Showgirl	Won	
Glamour Awards	2024	Woman of the Year	—N/a	Won	
Golden Globe Awards	2025	Best Actress in a Motion Picture – Drama	The Last Showgirl	Nominated	
Golden Raspberry Awards	1996	Worst Actress	Barb Wire	Nominated	
Golden Raspberry Awards	1996	Worst Screen Couple	Barb Wire	Nominated	
Golden Raspberry Awards	1996	Worst New Star	Barb Wire	Won	
Golden Raspberry Awards	2025	Razzie Redeemer Award	The Last Showgirl	Won	
Gotham Awards	2024	Outstanding Lead Performance	The Last Showgirl	Nominated	
Greater Western New York Film Critics Association	2025	Lead Actress	The Last Showgirl	Nominated	
IndieWire Honors (Winter)	2024	Performance Award	The Last Showgirl	Won	
Miami Film Festival	2024	Art of Light Acting Award	The Last Showgirl	Won	
MTV Movie & TV Awards	1997	Best Fight	The Last Showgirl	Nominated	
North Texas Film Critics Association	2024	Best Actress	The Last Showgirl	Nominated	
San Sebastián International Film Festival	2024	Special Jury Prize (Note: Shared with Kiernan Shipka, Brenda Song, Billie Lourd, Dave Bautista and Jamie Lee Curtis.)	The Last Showgirl	Won	
SCAD Savannah Film Festival	2024	Marquee Award	The Last Showgirl	Won	
Screen Actors Guild Awards	2025	Outstanding Performance by a Female Actor in a Leading Role	The Last Showgirl	Nominated	
Stinkers Bad Movie Awards	1996	Worst Actress	Barb Wire	Nominated	
Stinkers Bad Movie Awards	2002	Most Distracting Celebrity Cameo Appearance	Scooby-Doo	Nominated	
St. Louis Film Critics Association Awards	2024	Best Actress	The Last Showgirl	Nominated	
Sun Valley Film Festival	2024	Pioneer Award	The Last Showgirl	Won	
Teen Choice Awards	2005	Choice TV Actress Comedy	Stacked	Nominated	
Zurich Film Festival	2024	Golden Eye Award	The Last Showgirl	Won	
