= Jessika Gedin =

Swedish book publisher and radio/television presenter (born 1970)

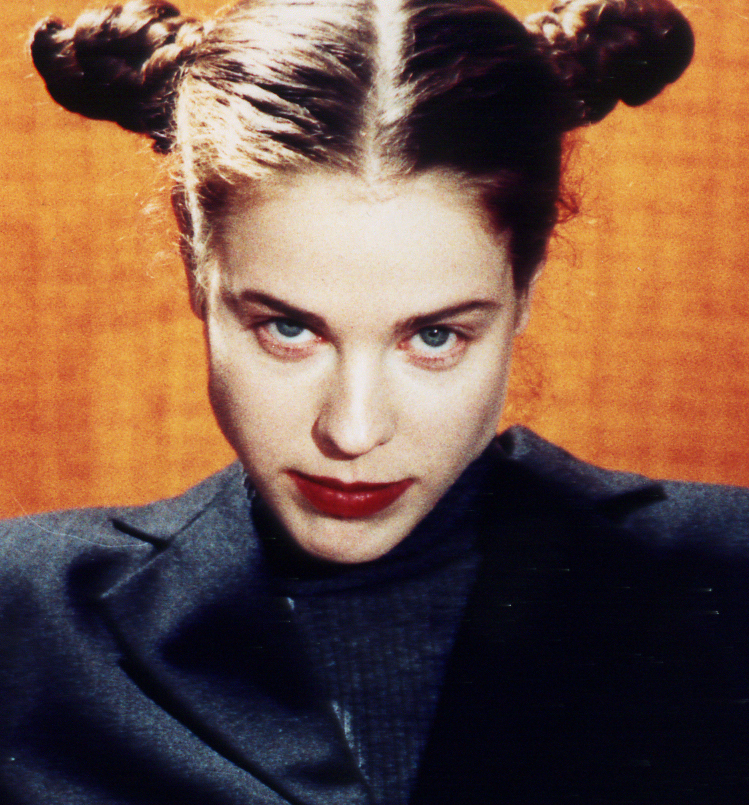
- Gedin in 2007
- Born: 12 April 1970 (age 56); Härnösand, Sweden
- Occupations: Book publisher, radio/television presenter
- Partner: Pål Hollender
- Children: 1
- Parent(s): Lena Fries-Gedin (mother); Hans I. Gedin (father); Anne-Marie Fries (grandmother)
- Relatives: Per I. Gedin (uncle)

Jessika Gedin (born 12 April 1970) is a Swedish book publisher and radio/television presenter.

Gedin was born in Härnösand, Sweden. She founded the publishing company Koala Press and Tivoli publishing together with her sister Eva Gedin. She has worked as a literary translator and has been in the jury for the August Prize.

As a radio presenter, Jessika Gedin is known for the show Spanarna at Sveriges Radio P1. On 29 June 2007, Gedin was the host of an episode in the Sveriges Radio show Sommar i P1. She became a television presenter when she started presenting the SVT show Babel in March 2012. She is also known for participating in the SVT entertainment show På spåret and as a guest panelist on Gomorron Sverige since 1993.

Jessika Gedin is the daughter of translator Lena Fries-Gedin and niece of the book publisher Per I. Gedin. She was in a relationship with the artist Pål Hollender for 22 years until 2024. The couple has one daughter together who was born in 2004.

== Translations ==
- Douglas Coupland: Livet efter Gud (Life after God) (Koala press, 1995)
- Alan Warner: Morvern Callar (Morvern Callar) (Tivoli, 1999)
- Douglas Coupland: Tio noveller (Tivoli, 2000)
- Tim Burton: Voodooflickan och andra rysarsagor för vuxna (översatt tillsammans med Stephen Farran-Lee) (voli, 2001)
- Nick McDonell: Nr tolv (Twelve) (Tivoli, 2003)
- Douglas Coupland: Hej Nostradamus! (Hey Nostradamus!) (Norstedt, 2004)
