= I en annan del av Köping =

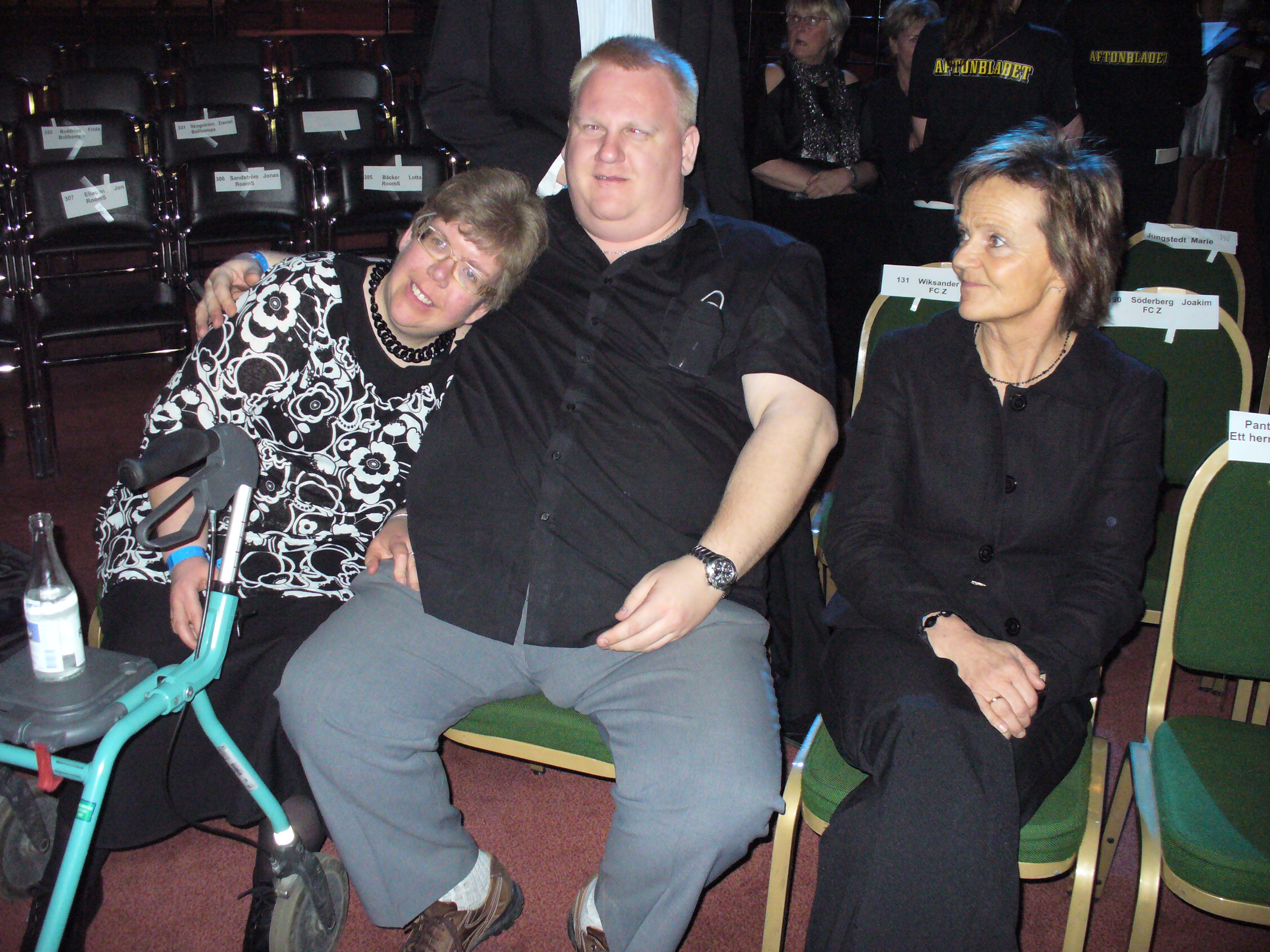
- Linda Hammar (left) and Mats Halvarsson (middle)
- Genre: Documentary film
- Created by: Filip Hammar
- Starring: Linda Hammar; Torbjörn Jonsson; Mikael Wiseby; Mats Halvarsson
- Theme music composer: Barry Mann and Cynthia Weil
- Opening theme: Make Your Own Kind of Music
- Country of origin: Sweden
- Original language: Swedish
- No. of seasons: 4
- No. of episodes: 24

Production
- Running time: 22 minutes
- Production companies: Stockholm-Köpenhamn, Nexiko

Original release
- Network: TV4
- Release: 2007 – 2017

I en annan del av Köping (literal translation: "In another part of Köping" or "In a different part of Köping") is a Swedish documentary television series which began broadcasting in 2007 on TV4. The series depicts the daily lives of people with learning disabilities in Köping, Sweden, and has been described as one of Sweden's most popular programs.

The people documented in the series are Linda Hammar, Torbjörn Jonsson (Tobbe), Mikael Wiseby (Micke) and Mats Halvarsson. Linda Hammar is the sister of Filip Hammar, the show's creator.

== Episodes ==
=== Season 1 ===
- 7 January 2007
- 14 January 2007
- 21 January 2007
- 28 January 2007
- 4 February 2007
- 11 February 2007

=== Season 2 ===
- 1 February 2008
- 4 February 2008
- 11 February 2008
- 17 February 2008
- 24 February 2008
- 2 March 2008

=== Season 3 ===
- 10 January 2010: "Tipspromenad"
- 17 January 2010: "Linda och Tobbe går på tivoli"
- 24 January 2010: "Bowlingturnering"
- 31 January 2010: "Linda fixar midsommarfirande"
- 7 February 2010
- 14 February 2010

=== Season 4 ===
- 20 February 2017

== Awards and nominations ==
- 2007: Kristallen - Årets dokumentär - Winner
- 2007: Kristallen - Årets program - Winner
- 2008: Kristallen - Årets dokumentär - Nominated
