= Haven: Call of the King =

2002 video game

- European cover art
- Developer: Traveller's Tales
- Publisher: Midway Games
- Director: Jon Burton
- Producer: Arthur Parsons
- Designer: Jon Burton
- Programmer: Dave Dootson
- Artist: Leon Warren
- Writer: Jon Burton
- Composer: Andy Blythe; Marten Joustra
- Platform: PlayStation 2
- Release: NA: 18 November 2002; EU: 22 November 2002
- Genre: Action-adventure
- Mode: Single-player

Haven: Call of the King is a 2002 multi-genre action-adventure video game developed by Traveller's Tales and published by Midway Games for the PlayStation 2. The game was also scheduled for release on the Xbox and GameCube, to be published by Xicat Interactive, but both versions were cancelled. A Game Boy Advance version was also planned, but never got beyond the earliest developmental stages.

Intended as the first part of a trilogy, Haven took over three years to develop, and combines action, platforming, puzzle, shoot 'em up, racing and space combat elements. Both Midway and Traveller's Tales championed Haven as "the next major development in videogaming," wherein the player could jump seamlessly from genre to genre, with Midway trademarking the term "FreeFormer gameplay" to describe the mixture of gameplay styles.

Haven received mixed reviews from critics, who believed the game spread itself too thin, resulting in multiple forms of average gameplay. Although Midway launched a sizable advertising campaign to promote the game, it received relatively little media attention and was a commercial failure. Plans for two sequels were subsequently dropped.

== Gameplay ==
Platforming gameplay in Haven. On the bottom left of the screen is the amount of antidote Haven possess. On the bottom right is his map, health meter (red dots on the left) and shield meter (empty bar on the right). The green dots indicate how much antidote he has until be begins to lose health.

At its core, Haven: Call of the King is an action-adventure game played from a third-person perspective, with much of the gameplay based around platforming. During the main platforming levels, Haven can perform various basic abilities; jump, double jump, high jump, crouch and attack. Haven also has access to an energy shield which he can deploy in front of him to protect him from incoming projectiles. He can deploy the shield indefinitely if it is not absorbing any impacts, but when it does deflect objects, it begins to deplete. As well as deploying the shield in front of him, Haven can also crouch and completely cover himself with the shield. He can also use the shield to perform a "shield smash," which is necessary for killing certain enemies and accessing certain pots.

Haven's main offensive weapon is a modified yo-yo device known as a "mag-ball." Its range is limited, but it can be used to defeat enemies, smash pots and grip onto "mag-rides;" electrical transports which bring Haven to other locations in a level. Haven can also use the mag-ball to perform a "power-spin" (where he spins 360 degrees with the mag-ball extended at all times, damaging anything that comes within range). He can also acquire a variety of firearms during the game, which briefly replace the mag-ball as his offensive weapon. These weapons include a laser shot, a rapid-fire cannon, a ricochet cannon, a five-way shot and a plasma shot.

A major part of the gameplay during platforming levels involves item collecting. For example, hearts, which are found in pots scattered throughout most levels and also dropped by some defeated enemies, replenish Haven's health. Catana orbs (small yellow disk-like objects) replenish his antidote meter, which, if it falls to zero, begins to deplete his health. Shield energy replenishes his shield abilities. Other collectibles include feathers, which are necessary for Haven to call Talon, a mechanical bird he has constructed. Often, calling Talon is necessary to progress through a level. On other occasions, Talon can carry Haven to secret parts of a level, otherwise inaccessible. Cogs are necessary to operate machinery, and are always a story-related items. Also found in many levels are silver keys. Any level which has a "Runepot" requires Haven to locate five silver keys before he can open the pot. Runepots hold Runestones, which can be used to unlock secret Runetowers later in the game. Completing the challenges in the Runetowers reveals Black Diamonds, which must be collected if the player wishes to complete the game to 100%.

Turret-based gameplay in Haven. In this example, Haven is on a ship under attack by pirates. The green reticules indicate target locks.

Other gameplay sections involve different control schemes and game mechanics. For example, when wearing the jet pack, Haven can accelerate upwards by expending fuel. When using the glider, as well as basic maneuverability, he can perform an air brake. In the biplane, he can roll left and right. In the speedboat and quadracer, he can accelerate and brake. When operating a turret or spaceship, he has access to forward and aft missiles and can lock on to enemies. The spaceship Sunsurfer, which Haven acquires towards the end of the game, also has access to different types of missiles, and can equip a shield.

== Synopsis ==
=== Background ===
One thousand years before the commencement of the game, King Athellion departed his home world to fight in an intergalactic crusade. On the Mount of Sighs, he left a giant bell, the Golden Voice, which was to be rung to call his return should he ever be needed. Many years later, an evil being named Lord Vetch enslaved Athellion's people, forcing them to work in his mines. To ensure their servitude, Vetch infected every slave with a deadly virus requiring a constant dose of antidote, the only source of which he controlled. He also ensured the people had no knowledge of the Golden Voice, or of King Athellion.

=== Plot ===
The game begins with Vetch (voiced by Steve Tarlow) receiving a transmission from his lieutenant, Overlord (Jason Gregory), who tells him a slave named Haven has been dreaming about the Golden Voice, something Vetch hopes to turn to his advantage. Meanwhile, in Virescent Village on the planet Ferra, Haven (Jake Rosewall-Gallagher) heads to work in the mines. There, he sees his friend Chess (Regan Kerwan) being questioned by a guard, who tries to shoot Haven. However, he misses, and causes the mine to collapse, knocking out Haven.

Upon awakening, he learns Chess hasn't been seen since the collapse. Setting out to find her, Haven reaches Darkwater Castle, home of Overlord, who contacts Vetch to tell him their plan is going well. Haven watches Overlord interrogate Chess about Haven's dreams. She refuses to tell him anything, and Haven intervenes, killing Overlord and freeing Chess. They escape, and Chess says that while in detention, she heard Overlord mention a wise old slave on the Isle of Heroes.

Haven heads there, and meets the Wise Man (Terry Bertram), who tells him the legend of Athellion; Vetch was determined to conquer Athellion's city, Aurias. However, he was unable to even approach the city, as its light would blind him. When Athellion left for the war, Vetch bribed a council member to infect the people with the virus, so they became his slaves. Over time, even the location of the Mount of Sighs has been forgotten. However, the Wise Man directs Haven to a map identifying the location of the Mount on the planet Auria. Haven reaches the Golden Voice, reading a warning stating that once the bell is rung, the person who rings it must wait there for Athellion's return. He rings it, but immediately Chess contacts him, telling him she is stranded without any antidote. He reluctantly leaves, returning to Ferra, and rescuing Chess.

However, she reveals she has been working with Vetch all along, who appears and congratulates her on her deception. Vetch tells Haven that Chess is one of his spies, deployed throughout his slave colonies to keep watch for anyone speaking of the Golden Voice. Vetch explains he had Chess call Haven away from the Mount of Sighs immediately after ringing the bell because the legend says that if the person who rings the bell does not remain on the Mount until Athellion's return, Athellion must return to wherever that person is - thus Vetch plans to wait until Athellion appears to Haven, and then kill him. With no more use for Chess, Vetch decides she can die with Haven. At this moment, Athellion arrives, telling Vetch he will surrender if Haven and Chess are spared. Vetch agrees, imprisoning them, and bringing Athellion back to the Mount of Sighs.

Haven escapes, but is unable to free Chess, and so sets out in pursuit of Vetch alone. He returns to the Mount of Sighs, where he sees Vetch kill Athellion. Haven confronts him, but Vetch proves too strong for Haven and is defeated. However, Vetch is unable to kill Haven, as the power of the Mount of Sighs keeps him alive. Vetch has Haven chained to a rock next to Athellion's body and leaves him alone to die on the planet, ending the game in a cliffhanger.

== Development ==
Haven: Call of the King was first announced on 16 May 2002 when Midway Games revealed they had partnered with Traveller's Tales to develop an original multi-genre game. Midway announced that Haven would be a third-person game with strong platforming elements combined with many other types of genre, such as turret-based shooting, land and water racing, space combat, and arena battles. They also revealed the game would debut on the PlayStation 2, but would subsequently be released for Xbox and GameCube.

The game was first shown the following week, at the 2002 E3 event, where a playable demo was made available. Whilst no narrative or story elements were in place yet, the demo featured environments from the Virescent Village level and the refinery level. Midway stressed the free-roaming nature of the game, saying "you can fully roam throughout the large environments on the ground, then get into a spaceship, point it at the sky and climb to outer space. Up there, you'll be able to do battle with whatever's mean, then return to the ground and start walking around again." GameSpot's Gerald Villoria wrote of this aspect of the demo "the planet and all the explorable areas in Haven are seamlessly linked--traveling from one area of the world to the next should incur no game stoppage due to load times. In fact, when Haven gains access to his flying vessel, he can literally rise above the planet's atmosphere and explore any of the continents. The landmasses smoothly raise in level of detail as the descending aircraft approaches, with nearly featureless topography slowly morphing into fully landscaped wilderness until the ship can literally hover above the treetops."

In a June interview with GameSpot, Traveller's Tales revealed the game had been in development for over three years, with them funding the project themselves, long before Midway got involved. They explained the game uses a game engine specifically designed for Haven, which allows smooth transition from third-person gameplay to piloting a vehicle. The engine also powers the cutscenes, allowing the camera to move and sweep around the landscape of a level, giving the player an idea of the route they have to take. Landscapes are fractally generated using the PlayStation 2's vector processors, which allows for considerable draw distance. The game also features night and day cycles and alternating weather patterns, such as randomly occurring rain showers (which prompt Haven to pull his hood up when outdoors). The developers were also keen to stress the game features no loading times; "Traveller's Tales intends for the game's loading to be invisible to players after the initial startup, thanks to carefully managed memory usage and constant streaming." They also revealed that after the PlayStation 2 launch, the game would be released for the Game Boy Advance as well as GameCube and Xbox.

In a 2006 interview with Gamasutra, writer/director/designer Jon Burton stated

I wanted to make a game like Haven ever since I played Mercenary, an old wire-frame game on the Amiga. As a player, I loved the slow reveal of the size of the world and being able to gradually break out of the traditional bounds expected in games. Playing Haven starts you in a village with basic platform gameplay. As you progress you get to ride across a fractal landscape, get a speed boat, then a quad bike, then a sailing boat, then a plane, and eventually a spaceship. Each step allows you to realize you could explore more and more of the game world. You could literally take off in a space ship from a level, fly around the whole fractal planet or off into space to another planet and land by a castle on another world and run off into the dungeons.

In July, a more complete demo was made available to gaming websites, featuring platforming levels, space combat, racing, and underwater sections. Traveller's Tales explained the game's story had been written first, with concept art then designed by Rodney Matthews. The story was then broken down into different gameplay genres. Expert game designers for each genre were brought on board to develop each small section of the game. The main team of developers then took each of those sections and attempted to unify them into one seamless whole. This demo also revealed more of the capabilities of the game engine, which could depict heat distortions, particle effects, real-time light sourcing, shadows, and reflections, as well as the already revealed day and nights cycles and random weather effects.

GameSpot's Ricardo Torres noted that "the varied landscape is fractally generated using the PlayStation 2's vector units, which are working overtime for the game and allow for some very impressive effects. For example, when you board a spaceship in a third-person sequence in the game, you'll be able to take off and head out into space without a loading screen. The game will track your movement and reduce the size and detail of the environments as you gain altitude. The reverse is true when you're approaching a planet and go to land--you'll find that detail seen from the air will scale in as you get closer."

However, in August, IGN's Hilary Goldstein expressed concern about the lack of attention the game was getting; "Haven has received little to no hype. In fact, it seems barely on the consciousness of the gaming public at all." On 30 October, Midway trademarked the term "FreeFormer gameplay" to describe the gameplay mechanics, stating "FreeFormer gameplay is the next major development in videogaming. The technology in Haven: Call of the King allows for an unbelievable cinematic-style smoothness and experience as you encounter the varied play mechanics in the game."

=== Cancelled ports ===
On 29 May 2003, Xicat Interactive announced that despite the game's commercial failure on PlayStation 2, they would be publishing the game for both the Xbox and GameCube later in the year. However, neither version was ever made.

== Reception ==
Reception

Aggregate score
Aggregator	Score
Metacritic	69/100

Review scores
Publication	Score
Electronic Gaming Monthly	7/10
Eurogamer	7/10
GameRevolution	C
GameSpot	7.6/10
GameSpy	2.5/5
IGN	7.4/10
Official U.S. PlayStation Magazine	3.5/5

Haven: Call of the King received "average" reviews according to the review aggregation website Metacritic.

GameSpot's Mathew Gallant called it "an often surprising action-packed platformer with a distinctive style and plenty of challenge." He was critical of Haven's mag-ball weapon, writing "the jumping and other mechanics of Haven are solid, but the limitations of the mag-ball and the fairly frequent requirements of its use tend to overshadow them." He concluded "While Haven does offer a lot, it's not quite a sure bet. Primarily, the annoying control problems involved with the mag-ball can make an already difficult game needlessly frustrating [...] Yet the overall feel is that of a very intense and action-packed game. The fast-paced, quickly changing gameplay is refreshingly unordinary, and while there's an excellent chance that fans of platformers will love the diversity and challenge, some may find it a little too restless and overdone."

IGN's Chris Roper called the game "both great and deeply flawed." He praised the gameplay types, writing "variety is what this game's all about, and it's quite welcome." However, he was critical of the lack of story integration into the variation in gameplay styles; "One complaint about nearly every goal is that it often doesn't make any sense why you're doing what you're doing." He concluded "Haven: Call of the King is quite an ambitious title. At certain points it's great, but at others it can be either frustrating or very boring. The game ties in most of the different genres in a pretty smooth manner. Nothing seems entirely out of place [...] Overall, the game is worth playing through. You'll have to tough it out through some aggravatingly boring sections, but when the game strays from the basics a bit, it can get to be quite fun."

Eurogamer's Kristan Reed found the game less innovative than Midway claimed: "being mainly a platform game with sub sections to add variety, it comes across as being more heavily indebted to the likes of Jak & Daxter and Ratchet & Clank than being anything revolutionary." He concluded, "Haven's pretensions to be some kind of revolutionary product seem sound and exciting on the surface, but scratch that surface for more than an hour or so, and it's apparent that what we're really dealing with is a better than average platformer with cleverly interspersed minigames to present the illusion of expansiveness and freedom [...] That's not to say it's a bad game, or that you won't enjoy it. If you're a real dyed in the wool platform gamer, Haven has plenty to admire, but it just fails to match or better what's gone before."

GameRevolution's Johnny Liu was critical of the core platformer gameplay: "the platform events come off as a standard, undisguised item hunt." Of the graphics, he wrote "the quality varies. Outdoor environments are doused in an over-saturated color palette, though the frame rate is smooth enough. The detail work in some of the interior dungeons offers some sharper textures and compelling lighting effects." He concluded "Though it's admirably ambitious, Haven is crippled by trying to do too much. Instead of simply having these separate parts strung together, it would have worked better had the game allowed you to switch from any of these game styles at will."

GameSpy's Benjamin Turner said, "The designers [are] attempting to create something unique by combining gameplay ideas from platformers, 3D shooters, vehicular action games and even Marble Madness. While the end result doesn't quite gel, I have to appreciate the fact that they tried." However, he noted that "rather than excelling, it ends up doing a fairly mediocre job of almost everything." He called the platforming sections "rough around the edges," criticizing the collision detection and level design, and was unimpressed with Haven's mag-ball. He concluded "there's just too much mediocrity and not enough quality. With a ton of tweaking and a heavy dose of polish this could have been a pretty good game. I get the sense that the creators' hearts were in the right places, but for whatever reason they couldn't execute. Their creation feels unfinished."

== Cancelled sequels ==
Haven was originally intended as the first part of a trilogy, however, due to the game's commercial failure, the second and third parts were never made. For writer/director/designer Jon Burton, the game was an extremely personal project. Speaking in 2006, he opined that because it began as a basic platformer, players and reviewers didn't give it a fair chance: "Because the first hour was basically a platform game people would play the game and write it off as another platformer." Burton always intended for the story to continue, and had very specific ideas as to how the plot would have developed:

the storyline was written to be an allegory of the Christian Gospel. As a Christian, I have always wanted to try and create a 'Christian' game, but that is incredibly difficult as the whole basis of Christianity is for you to give your life to Jesus, and trust and pray to God for help and guidance. That doesn't make for the best gameplay [...] In games, you want to be the hero, and Christianity is all about humility, which is the opposite of you being the hero. However, C. S. Lewis wrote a popular story which was an allegory of the Gospel, called The Lion, the Witch and the Wardrobe. He created a compelling story with pro-active characters, that also had a gospel message. So that's what I tried to do with Haven. The good guy was called Athellion (a the-Lion), the bad guy was called Vetch (witch), the traitor who caused the world's downfall was called Dasis (Ju-"Das Is"-cariot), and so on. There are loads of things like this in the game. The only problem was, the game ends with a cliffhanger ending paralleling The Crucifixion. As no sequel was ever made, there was no "after 3 days..." scene and so the full story was never told.
