= Elza Löthner-Rahmn =

Swedish musician (1872–1933)

Elza Johanna Löthner-Rahmn (21 June 1872 – 1933) was a Swedish composer, organist, pianist, and teacher who lived in America for several years and directed a music school in Massachusetts. She published and performed as Elza Löthner or Elza Löthner-Rahmn.

== Biography ==
Löthner-Rahmn was born in Koping, Sweden, to Alice L’Orange and Axel Löthner. She graduated from Stockholm’s Royal College of Music in 1889, and from the Virgil Piano School in New York in 1897. In 1900, she married Captain Magnus A. Rahmn in Boston and they had one daughter. In 1915, she accompanied the contralto Zella Kulp Lewis on a recital at Ellis Island arranged by the Commissioner of Immigration Frederic C. Howe.

Löthner-Rahmn was a member of the International Society of Pianoforte Teachers and Players. She organized music clubs in Sweden and America, and founded the Löthner Music School in Worcester, Massachusetts, before returning to Stockholm, where she worked as an organist until her death.

== Works ==
Löthner-Rahmn composed songs and works for piano, which were published by Elkan & Schildknecht and Miles & Thompson. They included:

=== Piano ===
- Fourth of July March
- Furusunds-luft
- Menuett
- Pianospelets Utveckling

=== Vocal ===
- Adrift (text by Anne Ayres Watson)
- Ellis Island Tots (text by John J. Camara)
