= Boston Tea Party (TV series) =

Swedish television program

- Genre: Entertainment
- Created by: Filip Hammar and Fredrik Wikingsson
- Presented by: Filip Hammar and Fredrik Wikingsson
- Theme music composer: Per Gessle, Bröderna Hallberg
- Country of origin: Sweden
- Original language: Swedish
- No. of seasons: 3
- No. of episodes: 26

Production
- Producer: Micke Svensson
- Running time: 45 minutes

Original release
- Network: Kanal 5
- Release: 2007 – 2010

Boston Tea Party is a Swedish infotainment television program that aired on Kanal 5 from 2007 to 2010. The show was created and hosted by the duo Filip Hammar and Fredrik Wikingsson. Its title is a reference from the historical event The Boston Tea Party. Filming for the series began on 30 August 2007, and the series premiered on 24 September 2007.

== Format ==
Each episode centered around unusual, provocative, or humorous questions, such as “Does a dachshund recognize its brother?” or “What is the best way to prepare human flesh for consumption?”. These questions were explored through interviews, filmed experiments, and discussions with an expert panel nicknamed the ''Super‑Femman''. The panel traditionally included five specialists: a political scientist, a psychologist, a historian, a physician, and a physicist. The show also featured a recurring light-hearted science segment called ''Veckans macka'' ("Sandwich of the Week").

== Seasons and Episodes ==
Season 1 (2007): Ten episodes aired, covering subjects such as the brain, money, the body, crime and punishment, love and hate, dictators, the future and space, celebrities, death and anxiety, and animals.

Season 2 (2008–2009): Ten episodes aired, with topics including childhood, food, a "crazy world", gadgets, lies, sex, vanity, religion and sects, illness, and human limits.

Season 3 (2010): Six episodes were broadcast, focusing on themes such as the senses, war and peace, the environment, gender differences, the sea, and highlights from the 2000s.

== External sources ==
Boston Tea Party at IMDb
