= Buy Bye Beauty =

2001 documentary film directed by Pål Hollender

- Directed by: Pål Hollender
- Release date: 2001
- Running time: 84 minutes
- Country: Sweden
- Languages: English, Russian, Latvian

Buy Bye Beauty is a 2001 documentary film by Swedish director and performance artist Pål Hollender. The film is about the Latvian sex industry and its being fueled by businessmen and sex tourists from Sweden visiting Riga. The film was shot in Riga in July 2000. The narration of the film is in English, with interviews conducted in Russian and Latvian.

== Controversy in Latvia ==
Although the director firmly asserts that "The film was meant for Swedes and was about Swedes", it caused controversy in Latvia, particularly for its assertion that the actual number of women engaged in the sex industry is substantially higher than the figures given by Latvian authorities. The film was also controversial because of scenes which involved Hollender having sex with Latvian prostitutes.

In Latvia, soon after its first screening at the Gothenburg Film Festival in February 2001, the film was seen as a purposeful attempt to distort the country's image given that it was supported by the Swedish Film Institute. Latvian President Vaira Vīķe-Freiberga called the film "political propaganda", Prime Minister Andris Bērziņš suggested that the country could file an international criminal case against the film's authors, and the Prosecutor-General's Office advised the Interior Ministry to ban Hollender from entering the country. TV3 Sweden, which aired the documentary twice, apologised to Latvians for its negative content. Hollender said in 2006 that despite having received two invitations, he has avoided visiting Latvia since the controversy.

In an interview to Latvian newspaper Diena in late 2010, Hollender revealed that he had lied in the film. He confessed that, despite claiming that the women he had sex with were randomly encountered in the streets of Riga, they were in fact professional prostitutes but had signed contracts with Hollender beforehand. Also, regarding the assertion that 40% of women in Riga are prostitutes, Hollender defended himself by stating that he used "Latvian sources".

== See also ==
- Petites cochonnes bulgares
