= Ursäkta röran (vi bygger om) =

Ursäkta röran (vi bygger om) (English: Pardon the mess (we're redecorating)) was a Swedish television programme that was broadcast on TV4 in 2002. It was Filip Hammar and Fredrik Wikingsson first success and was the show that brought them to fame. The concept involved Filip and Fredrik making fun of both famous and unknown people using a hidden camera and similar setups. The jokes were of a rather unusual, sometimes experimental, nature and some viewers took offense, feeling that the pair were humiliating innocent people.

The show made the headlines due to a segment called "the Swedish Nazi-reference championship" where they fooled singer and former Expedition Robinson-star Emma Andersson into an interview where they made as many Nazi-references as possible and observed her reactions. This included jokes such as naming the show they claimed to work for "Treblinka", claiming that Leni Riefenstahl was a modern director of music-videos, that Joseph Goebbels was a DJ whose music resembled Andersson's, and dozens of other references to the Third Reich and the Holocaust. Throughout the interview, Andersson wore a T-shirt with the text "Treblinka - Class of '45". Andersson didn't seem to react at all on tape. She later claimed that her reactions were edited out in order to make fun of her - a claim Fredrik Wikingsson has later refuted.

This caused a major controversy as many felt that the whole concept was mean-spirited and in bad taste. Tabloids reported the segment as a scandal and painted Andersson as a violated victim. Filip and Fredrik defended the segment by claiming that it is important to expose ignorance among public persons who young people might look up to. In the end, TV4 was fined by the Granskningsnämnden för radio och TV, who argued that, since Andersson was not a political person, the segment was intrusive to her privacy and integrity.

In a similar vein, the pair staged an interview with an openly homophobic priest, only to kiss each other in front of him in the middle of the interview. The programme only aired 4 episodes before it was cancelled.
