= Pål Hollender =

Swedish film director and performance artist

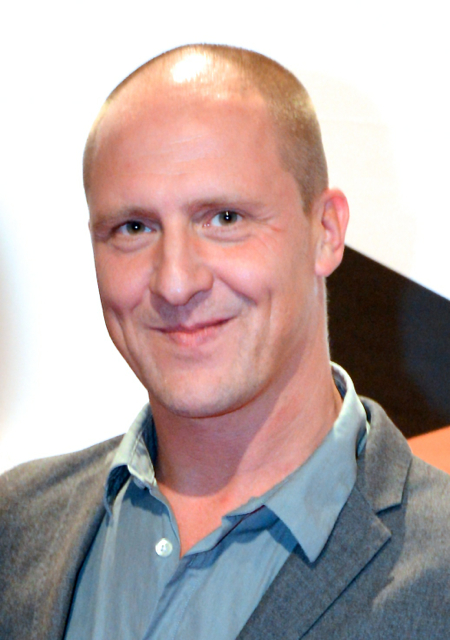
- Pål Hollender in August 2013
- Born: Pål Anders Jörgen Hollender; 20 July 1968 (age 58); Lidköping, Sweden
- Occupations: Director, Producer, Editor, Screenwriter
- Years active: 1997-2011

Pål Anders Jörgen Hollender (born 20 July 1968 in Lidköping, Sweden) is a Swedish film director and performance artist.

Hollender is known foremost for his controversial documentaries. Pelle polis (Pelle the Policeman) (1998) that dealt with issues of power and pederasty (with autobiographical remarks) was denied airing on TVs. His 2001 documentary Buy Bye Beauty about the Swedish interference in Latvian sex industry, which included himself engaging in sexual intercourse with several prostitutes in Riga, was condemned by Latvian authorities for its contents and allegations about the proliferation of the country's sex industry following its independence.

In his Unethical Pål Hollender, Hollender used a trust fund, denoting stock positions in dubious markets - such as guns, alcohol, tobacco, gambling, and pornography - to commemorate holders as he handed out funds from this stock, as it yielded positive return on investment in 2008.

Hollender became known through his participation in the 1998 edition of the reality show Expedition Robinson on SVT, he also participated in the 2003 edition. He has also been in television shows like Kanal 5's comedy series Grattis Världen! that featured Filip & Fredrik.

Hollender was in a relationship with radio presenter Jessika Gedin for 22 years until 2024. The couple has a daughter together who was born in 2004.
