= Petites cochonnes bulgares =

Petites cochonnes bulgares (lit. Little Dirty Bulgarian Girls) is a 2005 pornographic film by French porn director Christian Lavil. The film was released in May 2005 by the producers Alkrys. It was the first Western European pornographic film to feature Bulgarian porn actresses exclusively. The film was shot in the period 2004 - 2005 around the town of Haskovo and the Black Sea resort Golden Sands.

== Controversy ==
After its release the film caused outrage in Bulgaria for the DVD cover featured one of the girls ("Ellie") stepping on the Bulgarian national coat of arms with her left foot and a Bulgarian flag shaped as the map of Bulgaria with her right. Also the title of the film ("Little Bulgarian Sluts") was found to be degrading the Bulgarian nation. The issue was made public by Realiti Radio and Bulgarian authorities filed a criminal case against the French filmmakers. After six months of tracking, French protagonist of the film Phil Hollyday was arrested in Bulgaria. Bulgarian Ministry of Foreign Affairs and President Georgi Parvanov also intervened to have the DVD cover and the title changed.

In an interview with Bulgarian media on July 3, 2006, Christian Lavil told it was likely that the title would be changed to Petites coquines bulgares ("Little Naughty Bulgarians"). On October 12, 2006, the change was announced to the Bulgarian public and the coat of arms and the flag were removed from the DVD cover.

== See also ==
- Buy Bye Beauty
