= Mickey Mania =

1994 video game

Mickey Mania: The Timeless Adventures of Mickey Mouse
- North American Sega CD box art
- Developers: Traveller's Tales; Psygnosis (PS)
- Publishers: Sony Imagesoft; Sony Computer Entertainment (PS)
- Designers: Jon Burton; Andy Ingram; Mike Giam; David Jaffe
- Composers: Andy Blythe; Marten Joustra; Matt Furniss; Michael Giacchino
- Platforms: Super NES, Sega Genesis, Sega CD, PlayStation
- Release: SNES, Genesis, Sega CD: EU: 28 October 1994; NA: 1 November 1994; PlayStation: PAL: 1 March 1996
- Genre: Platform
- Mode: Single-player

Mickey Mania: The Timeless Adventures of Mickey Mouse (Japanese: ミッキーマニア) is a 1994 platform video game developed by Traveller's Tales and published by Sony Imagesoft for the Super NES, Sega Genesis and Sega CD. In the game, the player controls Mickey Mouse, who must navigate through various side-scrolling levels, each designed and based on classic Mickey Mouse cartoons.

A port for the PlayStation with enhanced graphics was developed by Psygnosis and published in Europe by Sony Imagesoft's successor Sony Computer Entertainment as Mickey's Wild Adventure in 1996.

Mickey Mania received positive reviews from critics, with particular praise given for its graphics and homage to the original cartoons. A sequel, Mickey Mania 2, was in development, but was eventually cancelled.

== Gameplay ==
Mickey Mania is a platformer in which players control Mickey Mouse as he visits various locations based on his past cartoons, ranging from his debut in Steamboat Willie to the more recent The Prince and the Pauper. Mickey can attack enemies by either jumping on them or by using a limited supply of marbles, which are collected throughout the level. Mickey can take up to five hits, represented by the fingers he holds up on his hand, which can be replenished by collecting stars, whilst extra lives can be gained by finding Mickey hats. Levels offer a variety of challenges such as puzzles the player must solve, escaping from a rampaging moose and fleeing from a flaming staircase.

The levels in the game are based from the following classic Mickey Mouse cartoons:

- Steamboat Willie (1928)
- The Mad Doctor (1933)
- The Band Concert (1935) (not included in the SNES version)
- Moose Hunters (1937)
- Lonesome Ghosts (1937)
- Mickey and the Beanstalk (1947)
- The Prince and the Pauper (1990)

== Development ==
Originally, Mickey Mania was planned to be released to coincide with Mickey's 65th birthday in 1993. However, as that would have only allowed for six months to develop the game, this idea was soon scrapped in favor of the more compelling concept of Mickey traveling back in time to his own original classic cartoons and subsequently recreating the events of the aforementioned shorts in the process. The game pays tribute to Mickey's early cartoon career. The game was designer David Jaffe's debut design project.

Following the success of Mickey Mania, a sequel was planned and began development with a prototype created in 1994. However, it was later cancelled so that Traveller's Tales could instead focus on developing a game based on the then-upcoming film Toy Story.

== Version differences ==
The SNES version is missing the hidden Band Concert level, the staircase sequence in the Mad Doctor level, a few special effects, some of Pluto's appearances, and some level-ending sequences. It also adds loading time screens in between each area. The Sega CD and PSX versions extend the ending to the Mad Doctor level, showing that the Mad Doctor had regressed to a baby, and adds a sequence near the end of the Prince and the Pauper level wherein Mickey must find pencils to call upon the other Mickeys from the six main levels to attack Pete, as well as giving Mickey extensive dialogue relevant to situations throughout the game. The Genesis version lacks the hidden area near the end of the first level. The PlayStation version enhances the graphics (all sprites are remade, the staircase sequences are rendered in 3D, and in the Mad Doctor level, crates occasionally come from behind which Mickey has to dodge) and adds a sequence at the end of the Mickey and the Beanstalk level where Mickey must run away from Willie the Giant. Willie makes no appearance in any of the other game versions despite being mentioned in the manuals of all four versions.

Both the Sega CD and PlayStation versions utilize a CD-based soundtrack composed by Andy Blythe and Marten Joustra with additional music by Michael Giacchino.

== Reception ==
On release, Famicom Tsūshin scored the Super Nintendo version of the game 28 out of 40, and the Genesis version 30 out of 40. GamePro gave the Genesis version a mixed review, applauding the visual style and motif of playing inside old cartoons, commenting that "the blend of past and present is magical", but criticized the game as too easy. GamePro concluded that "if Mickey's not your thing, you won't appreciate this cart. But if you liked any of Mickey's other games, you won't miss with Mickey Mania". The same reviewer later covered the Sega CD version. He praised its improved graphics, additional voice samples, and new level, but again concluded that the game is too easy to appeal to anyone who isn't a Mickey Mouse fan. A different GamePro reviewer covered the SNES version, and in contrast found that the game's difficulty was too high for younger gamers, but praised the responsive controls and sharp graphics. Power Unlimited reviewed the SNES version and gave a score of 91% summarizing: "Jewel of a game in which Mickey Mouse relives his adventures from countless cinema films with very inventive levels, eye-catching graphic design, a fantastic soundtrack and a unique character. That's the way it should be!"

Next Generation reviewed the Sega CD version of the game, rating it four stars out of five, and stated that "there's just enough innovation here [...] to make it a must, and if you've got kids, I think it's the law". It also reviewed the Genesis version, rating it four stars out of five: "Ingenious action like Mickey carefully mixing a potion while being attacked from every side, makes it hard to put down".

Maximum gave the PlayStation version two out of five stars. They praised the graphical stylistics, attention to detail, and solid gameplay, but criticized that the action never builds in intensity or pays off, and that the game makes no noticeable improvements over earlier versions. They nonetheless held it to be far better than the other 2D platformer than on the PlayStation, Johnny Bazookatone.

The game won the 1994 Parents' Choice Award. VideoGames magazine awarded it Best Sega CD Game. In 1995, Total! rated Mickey Mania 54 on their list of top 100 SNES games, praising it as "original and very playable". In 2018, Complex ranked the game 49 on their list of best Super Nintendo games of all time, writing: "A great game and a history lesson in all things Mickey Mouse: Mickey Mania was a fantastic title that fully utilized the broad color palate [sic] of the SNES. Walt Disney would be proud".
