= Jorden runt på 6 steg =

- Presented by: Filip Hammar and Fredrik Wikingsson
- Country of origin: Sweden
- Original language: Swedish
- No. of seasons: 2
- No. of episodes: 7

Production
- Production company: Nexiko Media

Original release
- Network: Kanal 5
- Release: September 16, 2015 – 2016

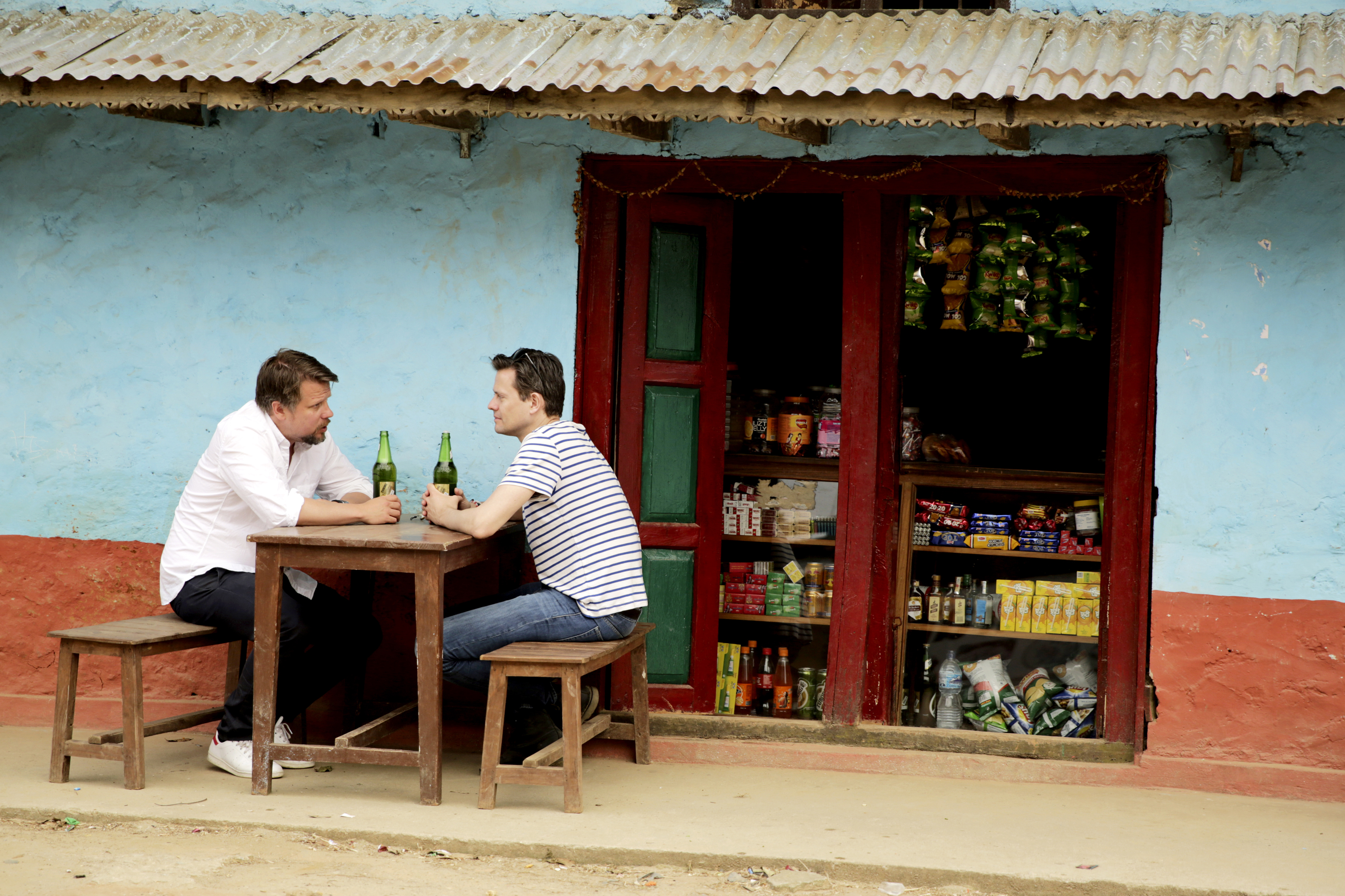
Filip Hammar and Fredrik Wikingsson in Nepal during the filming of the TV series Around the World in 6 Steps for Kanal 5.

Jorden runt på 6 steg, "Around the World in 6 Steps", is a Swedish infotainment television series starring Filip Hammar and Fredrik Wikingsson, produced by Nexiko Media and aired in Kanal 5 in 2015. The first season consisted of three 80-minute episodes and was aired in 2015. Filip and Fredrik have recorded a second season which started airing November 2016, and desire to export the format.

The format tests the six degrees of separation hypothesis. In each episode, Filip and Fredrik travel to a distant country, find a random person, and try to trace that person's relationships to a given celebrity (such as crime writer Leif G. W. Persson, chef Gordon Ramsay, and astronaut Buzz Aldrin) within one week. Throughout the first season, they visit all continents except Antarctica, travelling a distance equivalent to three trips around the world.

== Season 1 ==
Ep.	Steps	Route	Broadcast date	Viewership
1	7	0. Colchani, Bolivia; 1. Uyuni, Bolivia; 2. La Paz, Bolivia; 3. Sucre, Bolivia Fernando Cajías de la Vega; 4. Stanford, United States Herbert S. Klein; 5. Stockholm, Sweden Mats Lundahl; 6. Stockholm, Sweden Magdalena Andersson; 7. Solna, Sweden Leif G. W. Persson	16 September 2015	297000
2	6	0. Kartike, Nepal; 1. Kathmandu, Nepal; 2. Kathmandu, Nepal; 3. Otaru, Japan; 4. Queenstown, New Zealand; 5. Auckland, New Zealand Josh Emett; 6. Burbank, United States Gordon Ramsay	23 September 2015	243000
3	6	0. Dakar, Senegal; 1. Tunis, Tunisia; 2. Paris, France; 3. Washington, D.C., United States; 4. Washington, D.C., United States; 5. New York, United States Jim Clash; 6. Satellite Beach, United States Buzz Aldrin	7 October 2015	208000

== Season 2 ==
Ep.	Steps	Route	Broadcast date
1	6	0. Unnamed village, Namibia; 1. Walvis Bay, Namibia; 2. Hatzeva, Israel; 3. Tel Aviv, Israel Oren Gurevitz; 4. Jerusalem, Israel Shuki Weiss; 5. Quinta do Lago, Portugal Barry Dickins; 6. Westport, United States Michael Bolton	20 November 2016
2	7	0. Terelj, Mongolia; 1. Astana, Kazakhstan; 2. Istanbul, Turkey Olzhas Yermekbayev; 3. Cairo, Egypt; 4. Munich, Germany; 5. Abu Dhabi, United Arab Emirates Nader Mettawa; 6. London, United Kingdom Matt Allwright; 7. London, United Kingdom Jeremy Clarkson	27 November 2016
3	6	0. Marofototra, Madagascar; 1. Marofototra, Madagascar; 2. Istanbul, Turkey; 3. Orlando, United States Patricia Byron; 4. San Francisco, United States Jesse Cutler; 5. Los Angeles, United States Lillian Müller; 6. Cannes, France Pamela Anderson	4 December 2016 (online); 20 December 2016 (TV)
4	7	0. Phong Nha–Kẻ Bàng, Vietnam; 1. Hanoi, Vietnam; 2. London, United Kingdom; 3. Singapore City, Singapore; 4. Los Angeles, United States; 5. Irwindale, United States; 6. Los Angeles, United States Eddie Braun; 7. Los Angeles, United States Charlie Sheen	11 December 2016 (online); 21 December 2016 (TV)
