= Christer Ulfbåge =

Swedish sports journalist

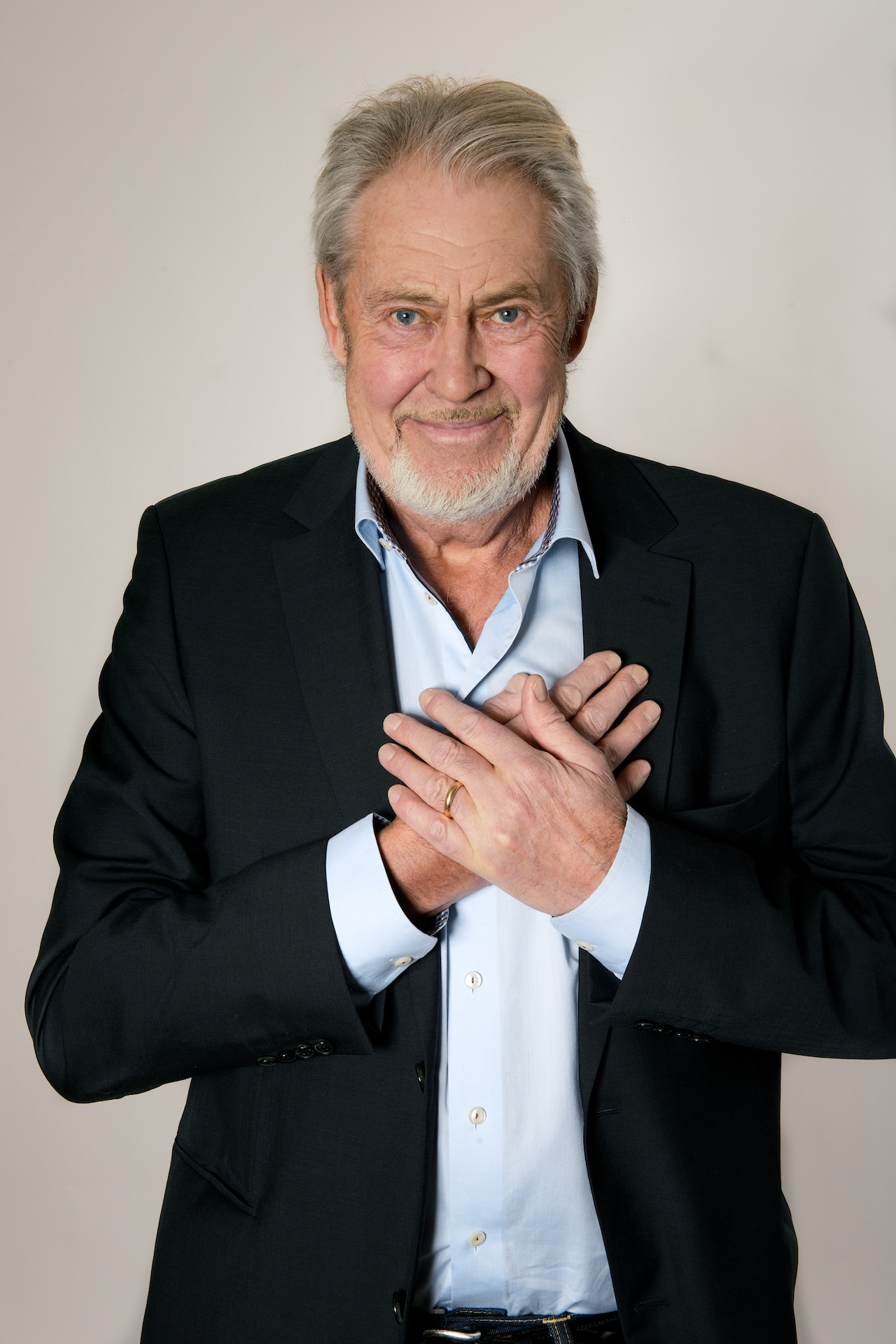
- Christer Ulfbåge (2014)
- Born: 7 May 1942 (age 83); Falköping, Sweden

Christer Ulfbåge (born 7 May 1942) is a Swedish sports journalist and commentator and earlier presenter of Sportspegeln and Sportnytt on SVT.

Ulfbåge was born in Falköping, Sweden. He started his career at Radiosporten at Sveriges Radio where between 1974 and 1980 among others he covered the achievements of Ingemar Stenmark. In 1991, he reported from the World Championships final for 100 meters in Tokyo. He then was, for many years, commentator for SVT's sports broadcasts of skiing and athletics.
