= Köping, Sweden =

Place in Västmanland, Sweden

Köping
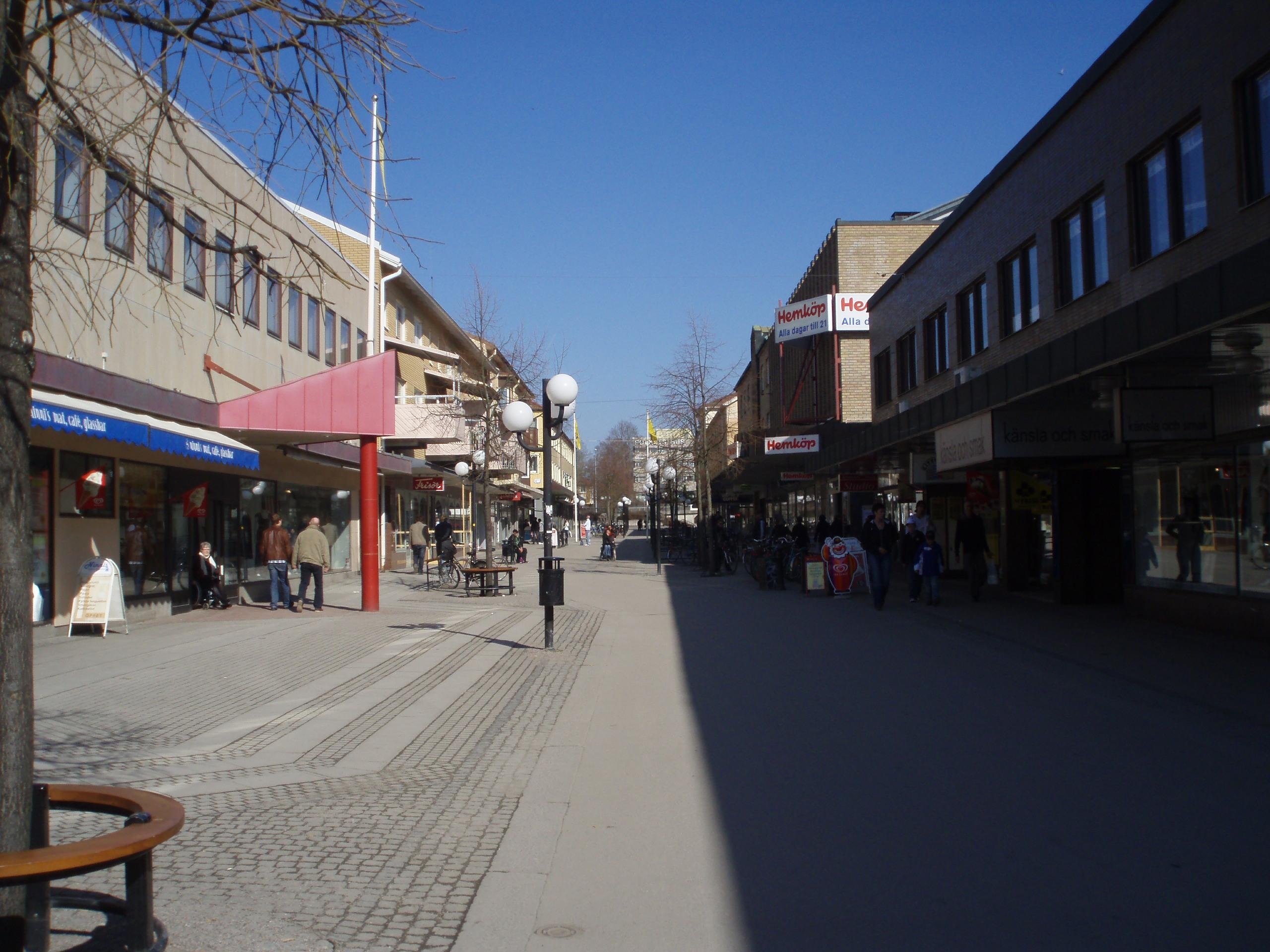
- Stora Gatan in Köping

- Location within Västmanland Location within Sweden
- Coordinates: 59°31′N 15°59′E
- Country: Sweden
- Province: Västmanland
- County: Västmanland County
- Municipality: Köping Municipality
- Charter: January 19, 1474

Area
  - Total: 11.86 km^{2} (4.58 sq mi)

Population (31 December 2010)
  - Total: 17,743
  - Density: 1,496/km^{2} (3,870/sq mi)
- Time zone: UTC+1 (CET)
  - Summer (DST): UTC+2 (CEST)

Köping is a locality and the seat of Köping Municipality in Västmanland County, Sweden. It had 17,743 inhabitants in 2010. It is known for the television series I en annan del av Köping.

== Etymology ==
Köping means merchant place. It was mentioned for the first time in the 13th century. It was probably given such a name as it did not yet have a charter. The central location of Köping deems it appropriate for merchancy for people from different parts of the country.

== History ==
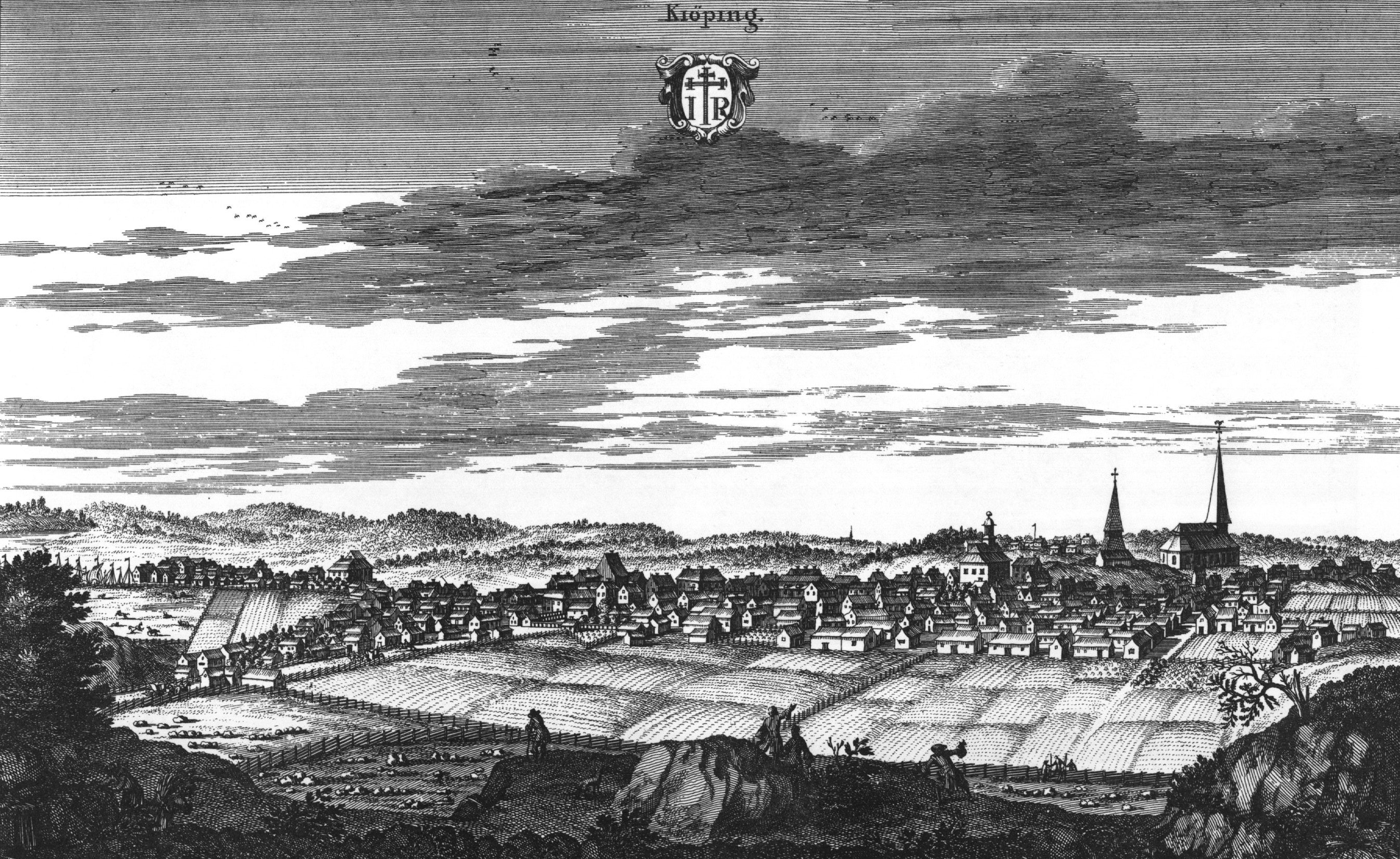
Köping in Suecia antiqua et hodierna.

People have lived on the site for a long time, which is evident not least from the Viking-age boat burial ground at Norsa. An old trading post has been located near Köping. It is first mentioned in a document from the year 1257, when a bishops' meeting was held on the site. Köping, with central and southern Sweden was christianised in the 11th century. A church built around 1300, the Köping Church, still remains from the early days. Köping has been known as a city since 1349 when its city seal was invoked in a letter.

At Köping was the bailiff's stronghold Köpingshus, mentioned for the first time in 1375 and destroyed by Engelbrekt Engelbrektsson's revolt in 1434. Köping got its charter on January 19, 1474. Köpingshus was rebuilt in the 1580s during Johan III's reign. Charles IX continued the work but later the work ceased and the bail had to lapse. In the 1660s, only ruins remained. Remains remained until the railway was built. Even in the 15th century, the name Laglösa kiöping still appears, which probably means that the trading post had no privileges.

The city's oldest church is probably a church dedicated to St. Olof, which was located after the current Mullgatan. The church appears to have been in poor condition in the early 15th century and then fell into disrepair and was demolished in the 1440s. After the current Köping church was ravaged by fire in 1437, it was given a size sufficient after the rebuilding to suffice for both the county and city parish.

In 1641, Queen Kristina Prästgärdet was donated east of the river to plots, and gradually the "new city" grew here with its own square, Hökartorget or Lilla torget. In the 17th century Köping municipality produced large amounts of iron that was transported to other countries.

In the 19th century Köping established itself as an industrial city, with a large mechanical workshop and a prosperous harbor. A fire in 1889 destroyed large parts of Köping, whereafter it was rebuilt using stone material under supervision of architect Theodor Dahl.

In the 20th century all kinds of companies have established themselves in Köping. Volvo built a large industry there in the 1920s; the arguably most known bed manufacturer in Sweden, Hästens, in 1924; and a number of gold groceries between 1940 — 1960.

== Gallery ==
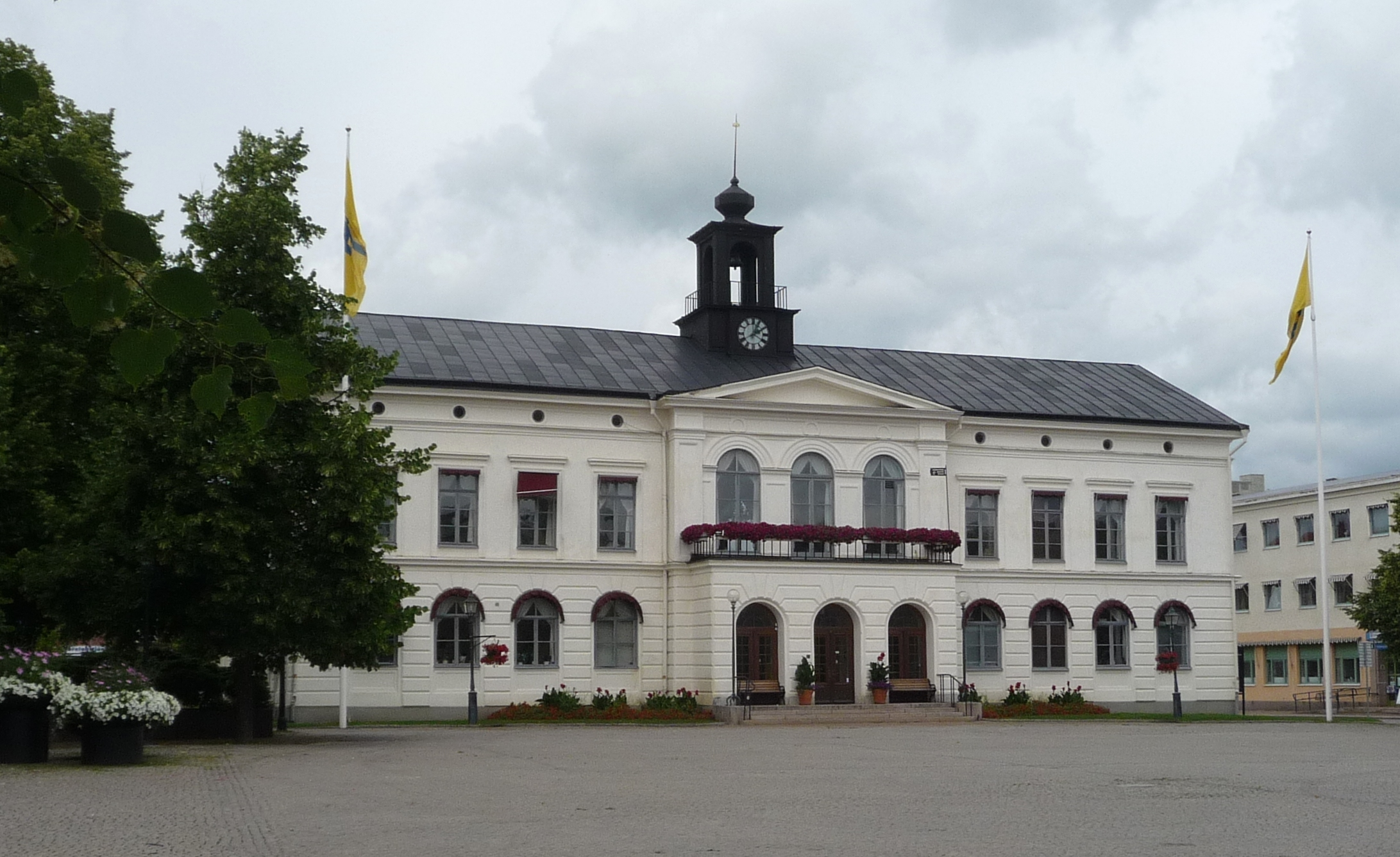
The Town Hall ("Rådhuset") in Köping. The open space in front of it is the town square, which is open to market stalls and public events

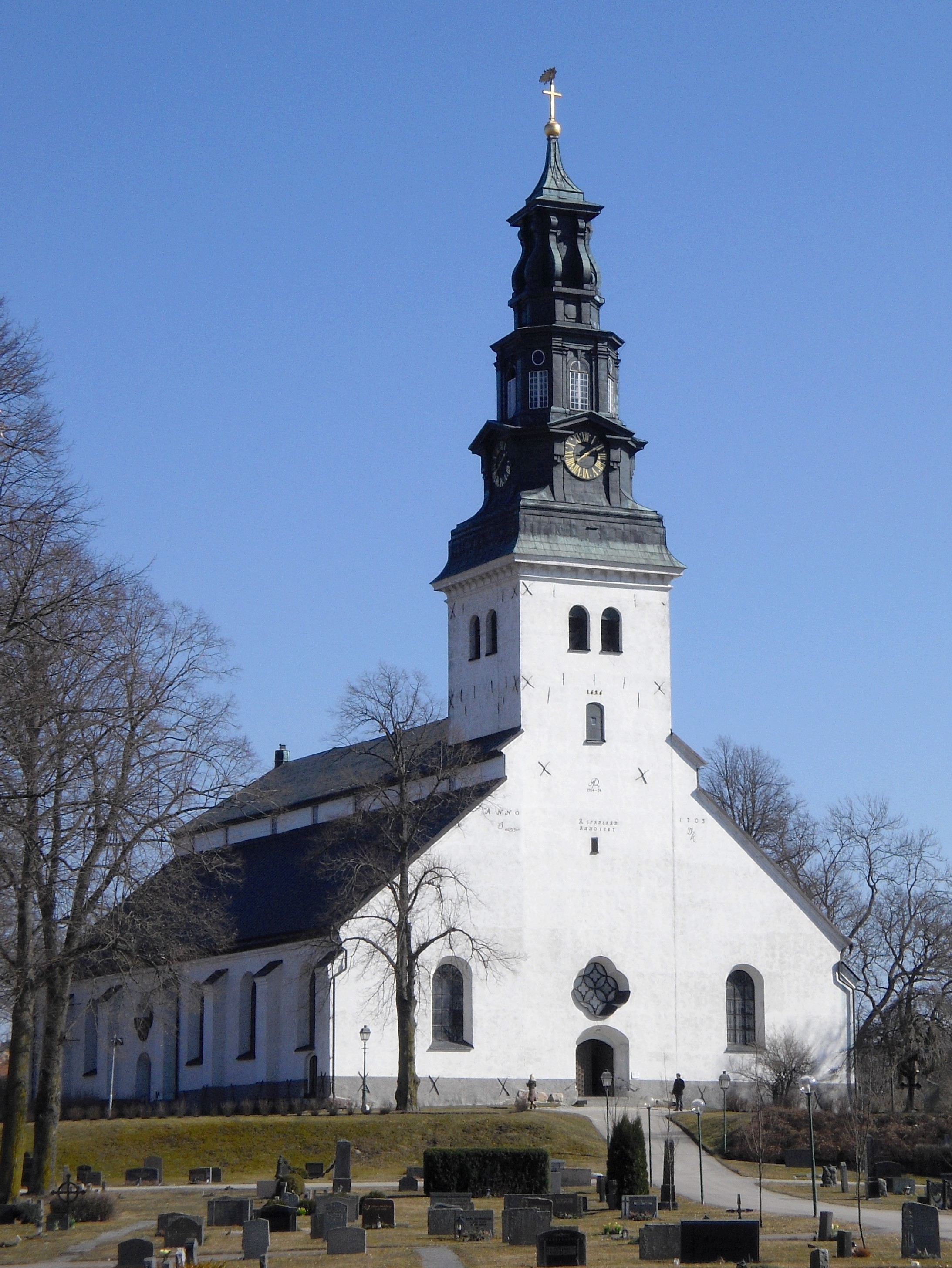
Köping church. There are over half a dozen church buildings within Köping's city limits, including two Catholic churches, but this church is the largest and most prominent, being located right next to the town square, and is usually referred to locally simply as "Kyrkan" ("The Church") or "Stora Kyrkan" ("The Big Church")

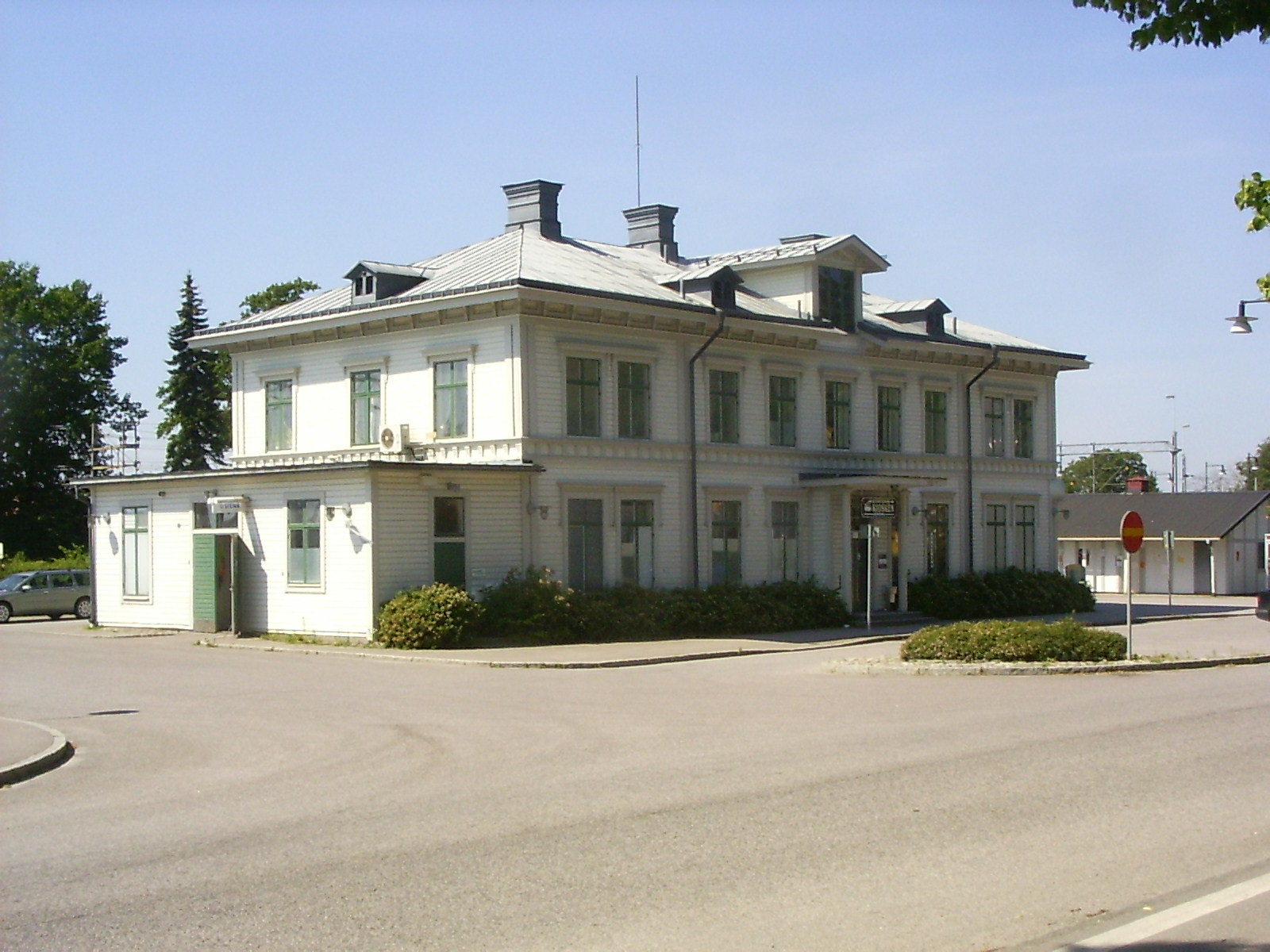
Köping railway station. King Carl XVI Gustaf was present when this station was inaugurated

== Sports ==
The following sports clubs are located in Köping:

- Forsby FF, association football club
- IBK Köping, floorball club
- IK Westmannia Frisk, athletics and ski club
- IKW/Köping BK, bowling club
- Köping FF, association football club
- Köping HC, ice hockey club
- Köping UBBK, basketball club
- Köpings BTK, table tennis club
- Köpings GF, gymnastics and cheerleading club
- Köpings IS, association club, bandy and football
- Köpings RK, riding club
- Köpings SS, swimming club
- Köpings TK, tennis and padel club
- Köping/Kolsva OK, orienteering club

== Notable natives ==
- Carl Wilhelm Scheele — 18th century chemist who discovered the functions of oxygen.
- Agda Östlund — suffragist and social democrat.
- Richard Dybeck — A composer of the Swedish national anthem.
- Henrik Sjögren — Ophthalmologist best known for the eponymous condition Sjögren's syndrome.
- Emir Bajrami — Player in the Sweden men's national football team.
- Charta 77 (band) — Swedish punk rock band.
- Johan Gustafsson — Professional player: ice hockey, drafted by Minnesota Wild, plays in Iowa Wild.
- Lars Johanson — Turcologist and linguist.
- Elza Löthner-Rahmn - composer, organist and teacher
