= Swedish Agency for the Media =

The Swedish Agency for the Media (Swedish: Mediemyndigheten, earlier: Swedish Press and Broadcasting Authority Swedish: Myndigheten för press, radio och tv) is a Swedish administrative authority organized under the Ministry of Culture. The Swedish Press and Broadcasting Authority decides on permits, fees and registration for terrestrial television, community and commercial radio; and monitor radio and television program services, on-demand services and teletext, to verify that the content of radio and television program adhere to broadcasting regulations. The Swedish Broadcasting Commission, a decision-making body within the authority, investigate if the content adheres to regulations, after complaints lodged by viewers and listeners, or at the initiative of the Swedish Press and Broadcasting Authority. Additional tasks include verifying that cable companies and IPTV providers retransmit SVT, and that the broadcasting companies are licensed and managed in accordance with Swedish legislation.

The agency was established in 2010 after the Swedish Radio and TV Authority (Radio och TV-verket) merged with the Swedish Broadcasting Commission (Granskningsnämnden för radio och TV), in conjunction with an amendment to the Radio and Television Act (SFS 2010:696).

In 2024 the agency was merged with Statens medieråd and changed its name to Swedish Agency for the Media (Swedish: Mediemyndigheten).

== Swedish Broadcasting Commission ==
The Swedish Broadcasting Commission (Swedish: Granskningsnämnden för radio och TV, GRN) was a Swedish government agency formed in 1994 to regulate already broadcast radio and television in Sweden. Since 2010, the commission is part of the Swedish Press and Broadcasting Authority.

=== Jurisdiction ===
The commission's primary function is to ensure that radio and television channels broadcasting in and from Sweden under licences issued by the government or the Swedish Radio and TV Authority observe the rules laid down in the Swedish Radio and Television Act. It has the power to impose fines on broadcasters it judges to have broken those rules.

A number of channels broadcasting primarily to Sweden do not actually broadcast from Sweden itself. This is principally to allow these channels to circumvent the strict regulation of broadcast advertising in Sweden (advertising breaks were illegal until 2002). The main channels targeting Sweden, but not broadcasting from there, are TV3 and Kanal 5, both of which are broadcast from London in the UK.

The GRN has repeatedly ruled that TV3 and Kanal 5, since they do not broadcast from Sweden, do not have to adhere to Swedish broadcasting regulations but are subject to the control of the British broadcasting regulator Ofcom. Other Swedish channels broadcasting from the UK are ZTV, TV6, and The Voice TV.

Representatives of commercial broadcaster TV4 have several times criticized both the commission and the foreign channels and argued for abolition of the GRN, letting the Swedish Press Council (Pressens Opinionsnämnd) take over its functions. Starting with TV4 Fakta in 2005, TV4 has decided to broadcast its new channels from Finland.

In practice, therefore, the GRN supervises only broadcasts from Sweden – including TV4 and its sister channels TV4 Plus and TV400. With the digital franchise renewal of 2006, however, the licence terms were changed so that TV4's digital-only channels would no longer be subject to the same terms as those applying to its analogue licence.

=== Cases ===
The commission has on several occasions found Ring P1, a call-in show on the public talk radio channel P1, to have been in breach of the requirements of Sveriges Radio (SR)'s broadcasting licence. In December 2004, for example, the GRN ruled that the programme had broken the terms of the licence when its presenter declared: "the fact that I'm a republican, have always been a republican, and always will be a republican isn't something I can do anything about". This statement was considered biased, since SR (like SVT, TV4, and UR) are required by their licences to maintain impartiality.

In 2004, GRN ruled that it was not clear that The Man Show, broadcast on TV4 Plus, was clearly satirical in intent. Since then TV4 AB has shown a disclaimer whenever it has broadcast the show. When shown on the youth channel TV400, this was replaced with a satirical film containing photographs of the members of the GRN.

The Oprah Winfrey Show was fined several times for improper support (mostly concerning "Oprah's favorite things") and had to be moved from TV4 to TV3.

== See also ==
- Sveriges Radio
- Sveriges Television

== Notes ==
- Case SB823/04 at GRN (PDF file, in Swedish)
