= Marc Hollender =

American psychiatrist

Marc Hale Hollender (1916–1998) was an American psychiatrist.

== Biography ==
Hollender was born in Chicago, Illinois on December 19, 1916. He primarily grew up there, but also spent parts of his early life in Mineral Point and Linden, Wisconsin. He was educated at Loyola University, Northwestern University, and the University of Illinois College of Medicine. He became a clinical assistant professor at the University of Illinois College of Medicine in 1946, and was promoted to associate professor there in 1950. In 1956, he was named professor and Chairman of the Department of Psychiatry at SUNY Upstate Medical University. While there, he reassigned Thomas Szasz, who was then a professor at the university, to only teach classes in the medical school, not in the university's hospital. Hollender instead reassigned Szasz to teach at the Veterans Administration hospital near the university, a decision Szasz initially tolerated but later decided was unacceptable. Hollender ultimately resigned from the university in 1966. In 1970, he became Chairman of the Department of Psychiatry at the Vanderbilt University Medical Center, a position he continued to hold until 1983. He died on August 9, 1998.
