= Per I. Gedin =

Swedish publisher and writer (born 1928)

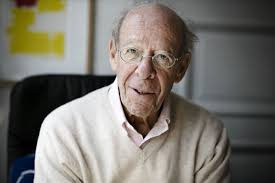
- Born: July 23, 1928; Berlin

Per I. Gedin (born July 23, 1928, in Berlin) is a Swedish publisher and writer.

== Biography ==
After Gedin received his bachelor's degree in art history from the Uppsala University, he began working at the Albert Bonnier Publishing House as the head of the Booksellers Book Club. The Booksellers Book Club was founded by Albert Bonnier when it was reprinted in 1942. In 1957, he presented an initiative publication of the first modern Swedish pocket book called 'Aldous books'. The Aldous books were soon expanded with the Dolphin series in separate publication, called the Aldous Publishing.

The Aldous books are a collection of scientific books from the Aldous / Bonnier Group. These books were pocket-sized and included different topics such as religion, astronomy, language, economics and geography.

The books were originally named just 'Aldous', but in 1967 it was renamed to the Aldous Books Series. Dolphin Books were also a series of books published by the publisher of Aldous Bonier in the 1960s, 70s, and 80s. This collection included new translations as well as new versions of previous translations, Swedish literature, works of Nobel laureates in literature, writers of detective novels, short stories, poetry, and theatre scripts.

In 1961, Gedin became the owner and publisher of Wisterand and Walstrom's publications. He worked at Gedin Publication between the years 1987 to 1998. Over the years, he had learned and worked hard in the book industry.

He worked as a member of the board of directors in the Swedish Magazine Publishers Association from the years 1967 to 1979 and became the chairman of the association in the years of 1992–1993.

== Awards and Favors ==
In the years 1990–1993, he won the creativity for the August Award. The August Award is an annual Swedish literary award. The award is awarded to the Swedish New Year Book Publishers by the Swedish Publishers Association established since 1989. From 1992, the prize was awarded and given to three types of stories. The legal books, books for children, and adolescents’ books. This method of awarding was created and initiative by Per I. Gedin. In 1999, he was nominated as PhD in philosophy from the Stockholm University and in 2012 he received the Övralid Award.

The Övralid Award is a literary award given by the Övralid Foundation since 1945, in partnership with the Heidenstamsällskapet.

== Activities ==
Among his responsibilities we can recognize the Universal Pen Club in 1974–1967, Moon Book (A subsidiary of the Bonair Group) from 1973 to 2006, and pocket bookstores in 1992–2004. He was the chairman of the board of directors and Lead Partner from 2006 to 2011. In 1999 and after, Gedin worked mainly as a writer. He wrote books about Verner von Heidenstam, Karl Otto Bonnier, Carl Larsson, and Isaac Grünewald.

In 2013, he was chosen as the honorary member of the Heidenstam Society.

== See also ==
- Aleksandr Solzhenitsyn
