= High Chaparall =

- Created by: Filip Hammar and Fredrik Wikingsson
- Starring: Filip Hammar and Fredrik Wikingsson
- Country of origin: Sweden
- Original languages: English, Swedish
- No. of episodes: 31

Production
- Running time: 45 minutes

Original release
- Network: Kanal 5
- Release: 2003 – 2008

High Chaparall is a Swedish television program which first aired in 2003 on the Kanal 5 network. The show is an interview/adventure series featuring the Swedish comedy duo of Filip Hammar and Fredrik Wikingsson. Although the pair continued to be provocative, this program proved to be less controversial than their previous television work and ultimately became much more successful. The team is known popularly in Sweden as simply "Filip and Fredrik."

== Concept ==
Taking a camera team to America, Hammar and Wikingsson filmed a series of multi-day interviews with minor celebrities and has-beens such as Fabio Lanzoni, Pamela Anderson, Ron Jeremy, Tonya Harding, Uri Geller and Gary Busey. Rather than just sitting down and talking, they follow the stars around for several days and engage themselves in various everyday activities of the celebrities' lives. Aside from instances when the hosts are speaking privately with each other or to the camera or camera operators, the series is almost entirely in English.

With varying levels of success and hilarity, Hammar and Wikingsson are welcomed into the lives of infamous personalities who often introduce them to their families, sing songs with them and take the Swedes to their favorite restaurants or recreation spots. Many speak candidly about their lives before, during and after their greatest successes. Some of their interview subjects seem to become genuinely entertained by and endeared to the duo (Vince Neil of Mötley Crüe and his parents, Charlene Tilton of the soap opera Dallas and her daughter Chastity). However, the subjects of other episodes are either bewildered by Filip and Fredrik or become increasingly more uncomfortable (or even mildly irritated) during the relentless onslaught of questions, games and songs (Lorenzo Lamas, Gary Busey).

The pair have a style of questioning which peppers their friendly, casual conversations with intensely personal or embarrassing questions. Hours of this push-pull gradually opens their subjects up to either annoyance or hugging and bonding. They are unafraid of asking celebrities how much money they have or what it feels like to not be so famous anymore. The home audience in Sweden is generally familiar with their incessant, boyish troublemaking which makes their antics all the more hilarious when the necessity arises for them to quickly, cleverly hide behind the guise of innocent curiosity of foreign journalists.

== Regular segments ==
A short biography segment introduces the program's guest at the beginning, during which seemingly unrelated images quickly appear on the screen. Each picture is in fact a humorous reference to something similar - or related - to the subject matter. A viewer may need to see this one-minute introduction many times - and be well-versed in Swedish pop culture - in order to catch all the rapid, subversive jokes.

A typical 45-minute episode is taped over two full days and features Filip and Fredrik visiting a celebrity at home in Los Angeles, asking them personal questions while taking a tour of their house, singing a song for them (often a Swedish song which has been translated into English), making an outing to one of the star's favorite places to eat, a series of elaborate would-you-rather questions, and frequently concludes with the hosts and subjects drinking alcohol together.

At some point during each episode, they administer a quick quiz called "Bra Eller Anus" (translates to "Good or Anus") in which the interviewee is presented with an idea, a thing or a description of a person, and must deem them "bra" or "anus." The quiz is introduced by an absurd theme song which is played on an equally ridiculously pimped-out cassette jam box that has traveled around America with them. The tape player was spectacularly destroyed in the final episode of the second season after it failed to work for an interview at the Knob Creek Gun Range in Kentucky.

Despite having recurring segments and well-known guests, the program is never taped in a proper studio. Instead it follows a free-form style, consisting entirely of location shoots, constant improvisation and it often changes course unexpectedly. The hosts and subjects are often seen passing or clipping microphones onto each other, and it is not unusual for the cameras to be jostling into position while things are happening. Each episode is a loose adventure, the course of which is largely dependent on the celebrity being interviewed. Hammar has described their approach as "We just turn on the camera and go."

The signature melody for the show is the song I'm Gonna Be (500 Miles) by The Proclaimers.

The first three of the program's four seasons have been released on DVD. In 2005, a version of the show's format was used for a meeting with former Swedish prime-minister Ingvar Carlsson.

== Episode overview ==
Season 1:

Episode #	Running length	Theme
Episode 1	45 min	Dennis Rodman
Episode 2	45 min	Miss Nude America
Episode 3	45 min	Fabio Lanzoni
Episode 4	45 min	Pamela Anderson
Episode 5	45 min	Ron Jeremy
Episode 6	45 min	Ian Ziering
Episode 7	45 min	Porn/Sitcom: Rhapsody in cock
Episode 8	45 min	Philip Michael Thomas
Episode 9	45 min	Steve-O
Episode 10	45 min	Monica Lewinsky

Season 2:

Episode #	Running length	Theme
Episode 1	45 min	Vince Neil
Episode 2	45 min	Uri Geller
Episode 3	45 min	Tonya Harding
Episode 4	45 min	Gary Busey
Episode 5	45 min	Robert Englund
Episode 6	45 min	Lorenzo Lamas
Episode 7	45 min	Charlene Tilton (Gary Busey makes a cameo)
Episode 8	45 min	Corey Feldman
Episode 9	45 min	Gay-TV
Episode 10	45 min	Machinegun convention in the US

Season 3:

Episode #	Running time	Theme	First aired
Episode 1	45 min	Another meeting with Fabio	November 1, 2004
Episode 2	45 min	Brigitte Nielsen	November 8, 2004
Episode 3	45 min	Mahir	November 15, 2004
Episode 4	45 min	James Hewitt	November 22, 2004
Episode 5	45 min	Bollywood	November 29, 2004
Episode 6	45 min	Another meeting with Gary Busey	December 6, 2004
Episode 7	45 min	Ilona Staller (Cicciolina)	January 24, 2005
Episode 8	45 min	Cannabiss Cup	January 31, 2005

Season 4:

Episode #	Running time	Theme	First aired
Episode 1	45 min	Andy Dick	May 12, 2008
Episode 2	45 min	Shannen Doherty	May 19, 2008
Episode 3	45 min	Mike Tyson	May 26, 2008
