= Kanal 5 (Swedish TV channel) =

Swedish free-to-air television channel

- Country: Sweden
- Broadcast area: Sweden

Programming
- Picture format: 1080i HDTV

Ownership
- Owner: Warner Bros. Discovery EMEA (Skydance Corporation)
- Sister channels: Kanal 9 Kanal 11; Discovery Channel (Swedish); TLC (Swedish)

History
- Launched: 27 March 1989
- Former names: Nordic Channel (1989–1991); TV5 (1991); TV5 Nordic (1991–1994); Femman (1994–1996)

Links
- Website: www.discoveryplus.com/se/channel/kanal-5

Availability

Terrestrial
- Boxer: Channel 5

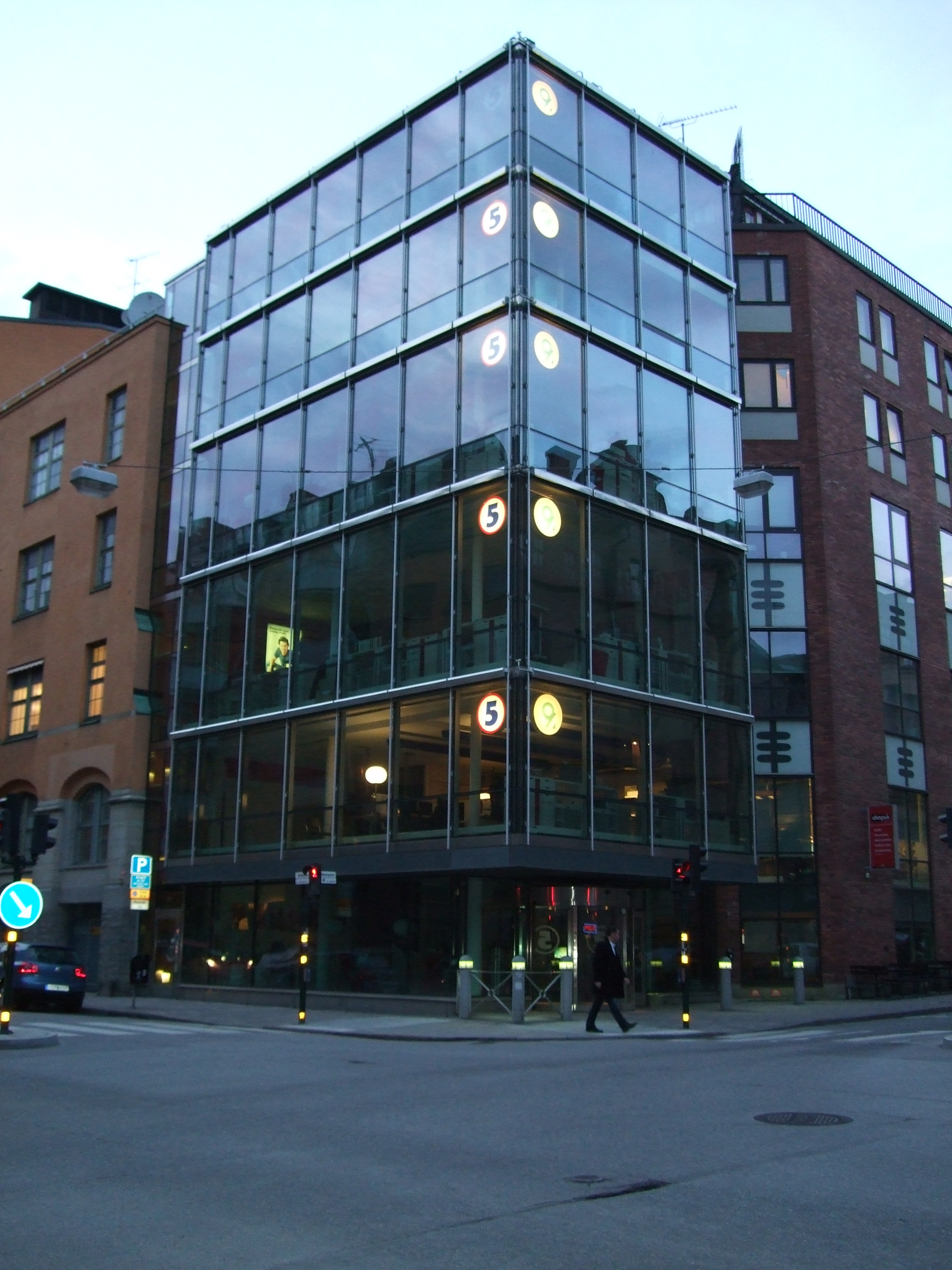
Swedish headquarters for Kanal 5 in Stockholm

Kanal 5 (Channel 5) is a Swedish television channel that was launched in 1989. It is owned by the US-based media company Skydance Corporation, changing its ownership from ProSiebenSat.1 Media in April 2013.

After a troublesome 1990s, Kanal 5 launched new strategies in the early 2000s (decade) that established it as a popular entertainment channel targeting young people. The channel's slogan is "Roligare TV" ("More Entertaining TV") and it only broadcasts entertainment, such as series, movies, reality series and infotainment documentaries. In 2006, the channel was the most popular channel among Swedes aged 15–24.

== History ==
=== Nordic Channel ===
Åke Wilhelmsson and Kari Storækre through production company Karissima aired in 1988 God Morgon Scandinavia, a breakfast programme for Sky Channel, at the time when it was widely available on Swedish cable networks. When Sky announced that it would change its target group and started aiming at the British market, the couple began to prepare their own channel. In January 1989, the couple and lawyer Ingemar Drogell announced a prospect for potential shareholders on Nordic Channel.

On 8 March 1989, businessman Matts Carlgren announced at a press conference that he had entered the new channel as a financer. The launch of the channel was scheduled for 27 March and they had secured a transponder on an Eutelsat satellite. The idea since the beginning was that independent production companies would gain airtime on the channel. The channel launched on 27 March 1989, with broadcasts from a studio rented by Utbildningsradion in Stocksund. A few months after launching, Carlgren bought shares from the other owners. The director of programming was Henrik S. Järrel, who left the channel in 1991 to become a member of parliament.

Among the companies that booked airtime on Nordic Channel was Utbildningsradion itself, who used the slots for a programming block financed by TV license fees. In December 1989 the "Scandinavian Business Channel" from Dagens Industri and Aktiefrämjandet started. Even the Pentecostal Church bought airtime instead of airing services from its American counterparts. On 1 January 1992, Miniatyr, a programme aimed at the Persian diaspora, premiered.

Aside from these slots the channel also broadcast its "own" programmes, among them the American soap opera "The Bold and the Beautiful" which became its first ratings success. Other programmes in the lineup included older Swedish films, acquired crime series and music videos. Bingolotto was supposed to premiere on Nordic Channel, but subsequently had its national premiere on TV4.

=== American administration ===
The channel made heavy losses during its first years. In September 1991, Carlgren sold 75% of the channel to TV1 Europa (later renamed Scandinavian Broadcasting System), headed by Harry E. Sloan, who had already bought Kanal 2 in Copenhagen and TVNorge in Norway. He renamed the channel TV5 and in November of that year moved to the Tele-X satellite where TV4 was already present. However, the French language TV5, complained and the channel had to be called TV5 Nordic. This was still in the early years of cable television and French TV5 still had widespread distribution in Swedish cable networks. With the new owners, investments were being made in bringing more imported American TV series, such as Star Trek and Bonanza.

In early 1993 the channel started airing short news updates, called 5i. They also took over the programme Vem tar vem? from SVT. In March 1993 SBS was listed on the New York Stock Exchange, giving the channel an injection of capital. In January 1994 the channel left UR's Stocksund facilities to premises of its own.

TV5 Nordic finally had to drop its name in 1994, after the Stockholm District Court appealed in favour of the French TV5 on 25 November 1993. Consequently, on 22 March 1994, the channel became known as Femman ("The Five"). In 1995, it premiered the American comedy Friends.

Autumn 1994 saw the premiere of Femman's first Swedish drama series, soap opera Solo which didn't gain successful ratings. In general, at the time, the channel's main programmes were American imports. American sitcom The Fresh Prince of Bel-Air started airing in February 1994, becoming a success. In March 1995 Paramount Television became a part-owner of SBS and signed an agreement to provide its films and TV series to the channel for ten years, giving it the choice of first option in the Swedish market, improving the quality of the channel's programming.

In 1994, TV3 founder Jan Steinmann was recruited to lead SBS's Nordic operations. The fact that Steinmann moved to the competitor too soon wasn't well received by Stenbeck and an agreement was reached in which Steinmann would be quarantined for six months before starting his activities at SBS on 1 July 1995. Meanwhile, the channel's CEO at the time, Hans von Schreeb, became the president of the channel's executive council and former sales manager Lena Åhman was named the new CEO, the first woman to lead a Swedish national channel. When Steinmann arrived to SBS, he appointed his former director of programmes at TV3, Mats Örbrink, for the same post on Femman. Meanwhile a conflict emerged with Åhman who renounces and was replaced by Patrick Svensk, who also came from TV3. Brita Sohlberg, TV3's former leader of its news division, was appointed as vice-CEO of the channel.

The new leadership initiated a fundamental change to the network, which, among other things, led to increased investment in in-house productions. Agreements with independent production companies ended at the start of 1996, meaning that Miniatyr and the religious services were removed from the schedule.

=== 1996 relaunch as Kanal 5 ===
On 4 February 1996 the channel changed its name again, to the current Kanal 5. The name change was preceded by a legal process involving complaints from a company in Umeå who used the name "Kanal 5" for its airport TV service. To solve this case, an agreement had to be reached.

Shortly after the rename new Swedish programmes premiered: Måndagsklubben with Caroline Giertz, Lusthuset, En ding ding värld with Johannes Brost, Fallet X with Walter Kegö, Det ringer på dörren, Emmas analys with Emma Sjöberg, Lotta with Lotta Aschberg, Ronnys rullar and Fråga Helene with Helene Backman. That autumn saw the premieres of Stjärna mot stjärna and the circus entertainment format Colosseum.

In 1997 Kanal 5 took over the rights of soap opera Vänner och fiender from TV3, until its conclusion in 2000. The network also premiered another original production, OP:7, a drama series set at a hospital.

Having operated at launch with a Luxembourgish license, the channel later received a British one. Initially, the channel continued having management and transmission from Sweden, but in August 1997 the British regulatory body ITC was notified that it needed to operate from the UK. Playout moved to London on 22 January 1998.

From the beginning, the channel aired unencrypted by satellite. The fact that the channel broadcast programmes in English without translation made it popular outside of Sweden, which infuriated programme rights holders, as the rights only applied to Sweden. The channel switched to the D2-MAC standard in the summer of 1998, but became encrypted on 19 October that same year, with a smart card required to watch the channel.

In November 1998 director of programmes Mats Örbrink left to be replaced in 1999 by Anders Knave. CEO Patrick Svensk left in November 1999 due to disagreements with SBS, with sales manager Manfred Aronsson taking the post.

Autumn 1999 bought the premiere of the reality show Villa Medusa and the sexual information programme Fråga Olle.

=== Roligare TV, sale to Discovery, under Warner Bros. Discovery ===
The channel moved its Swedish offices in spring 2000 to a new facility in Rådmansgatan 42 (in the corner with Döbelnsgatan).

With the end of Vänner och fiender came a new local soap opera, Hotel Seger which turned out to be unsuccessful. The Swedish version of Big Brother was launched in autumn 2000, becoming successful and running for six seasons.

In 2001 it premiered the talent show Popstars, indoor renovation programme Room Service and the American crime series CSI: Crime Scene Investigation.

In 2003 High Chaparall aired, Filip och Fredrik's first show for the channel. It was the beginning for the team's long collaboration with the channel which later included 100 höjdare and Ett herrans liv for Kanal 5.

In the 2000s the channel specialised mainly in American drama series CSI: Crime Scene Investigation, Desperate Housewives, Grey's Anatomy, and Criminal Minds. New sitcoms continued attracting viewers, such as later seasons of Vänner, Two and a Half Men, Cougar Town, The Big Bang Theory and Suburgatory. The last episode of Friends was broadcast on 15 December 2004, and attracted 965,000 viewers, one of the highest rated programmes in the channel's history up to then.

Despite the goal of making the channel "more entertaining", several local programmes contained elements of human interest and characteristics of public service: Boston Tea Party was a variation of Fråga Lund and Fråga Olle with topics including sex and co-inhabitance. Betnér Direkt discussed social questions and won Kristallen 2012 in the Factual and Current Affairs Programme of the Year category. Henrik Schyffert made political satyre in Veckans nyheter. The Big Bang Theory received the Swedish The Torsten Wiesel Midnight Sun Award prize with the justification of "bringing science to the living room" in June 2016.

In March 2007, SBS was acquired by the German media conglomerate ProSiebenSat.1 Media, while in April 2013 the Nordic part of SBS was sold to Discovery Communications, renaming it SBS Discovery Nordics in the process.

Kanal 5 is also involved in broadcasting the Olympic Games alongside sister channels Kanal 9 and Eurosport starting with PyeongChang 2018.

As a consequence of Brexit, the channel applied for a German license in Munich in February 2019, alongside eighteen other channels in the region.

On 15 January 2024, Kanal 5 and thirteen other channels owned by Warner Bros. Discovery in the Nordic region rebranded to a uniform identity. The goal of the reface was to, according to WBD, provide a more consistent and updated profile and to ease travel between Nordic countries to raise awareness of what channels are owned by the company. The main channel in each country adopted red as its colour; the colour-coded profiles make it easier for viewers to find content.

== Logos ==
Kanal 5 second logo from 2000 to 2024
