= 100 höjdare =

- Genre: Comedy
- Presented by: Filip Hammar and Fredrik Wikingsson
- Voices of: Bosse Hansson
- Theme music composer: Hammar
- Opening theme: "Pretty Belinda"
- Country of origin: Sweden
- Original language: Swedish
- No. of seasons: 6

Original release
- Release: 2004 – 2008

100 höjdare ("100 Highlights") is a Swedish TV series which was produced and aired on Kanal 5. Six seasons of the show were produced and it ran from 2004 to 2008. It was hosted by the comedy duo Filip Hammar and Fredrik Wikingsson.

In the first three seasons the hosts presented funny moments, often in the form of video clips, listing their 100 all-time favorites. In season two and three they also discuss the clips with celebrity guests. By season four the format changed and instead of showing clips, Filip and Fredrik made impromptu interviews with people, often in their homes.

The show won a Kristallen in the comedy category in 2006 and had a significant cultural impact as a generally lauded production.

== Season overview ==
=== Original format ===
The first season, "Sweden's 100 Funniest Moments", first aired on 5 September 2004 and consisted of nine 25 minute episodes. Wikingsson and Hammar presented the clips in a summer-themed outdoor environment.

The show lists funny moments and people that are not intended to be funny, i.e., no sketches or jokes, etc. The clips are chosen by the hosts and reflect their kind of humour. The well known Swedish sports commentator Bosse Hansson gave voice-overs on the video clips and animations illustrating the funny moments in the first two seasons. The theme song is "Pretty Belinda" by Hammar, Wikingsson and their producer André Linschooten. The trio called themselves Fille and the Fittpippers when releasing the song; the song was originally made by Chris Andrews.

Season two, first aired on 7 March 2005, consisted of ten 45 minute episodes. The theme for season two was "The World's 100 Funniest Moments". The production was now a bit more expensive and the show took place in a studio with live audience and one or two invited guests for each show. Season two featured a part of the programme entitled "Luca's Ladder", in which Wikingson & Hammars' gay Italian friend Luca Brasi presented one of his favourite clip from the first season.

Despite its title, season three of 100 höjdare consisted of eight different top ten lists, making it only 80 highlights. As in season two, each episode is 45 minutes and takes place in a studio with guests commenting the clips. Season three first aired on 21 November 2005.

=== Modified format ===
In season four, Fredrik and Filip try to find Sweden's 100 most original people. The winner of each show was invited for a grand finale where an overall winner was selected. Season four first aired on 28 August 2006. Season five, airing in 2007, was similar to season four, but included people from all over Scandinavia.

In season six, first aired on 17 March 2008, they travel around America trying to find "100 reasons to love the United States" in the form of very unusual people. In the last episode, similar to season four and five, they crown "America's most extraordinary person".

== Episode overview ==
Season 1–5 September 2004
Episode #	Running length	Guest(s)	#	Title	Year
Episode 1	25 min	No Guest(s)	100	Anders Björck on parade	1992
Episode 1	25 min	No Guest(s)	99	Ingemar Nordström's makes a video	1987
Episode 1	25 min	No Guest(s)	98	Lars Gåre's portrait on "Veckans nu"	2004
Episode 1	25 min	No Guest(s)	97	Strindberg vs Oscar II	1884
Episode 1	25 min	No Guest(s)	96	Alternativfestivalen	1975
Episode 1	25 min	No Guest(s)	95	A bleeding Bertil Svensson	1986
Episode 1	25 min	No Guest(s)	94	Election night with Erik Fichtelius	1994
Episode 1	25 min	No Guest(s)	93	Åke Svanstedt guessing the population of Sundsvall	1997
Episode 1	25 min	No Guest(s)	92	Torbjörn Nero films a JAS landing	1989
Episode 1	25 min	No Guest(s)	91	Glenn Hysén plans his summer	1990
Episode 1	25 min	No Guest(s)	90	Launch of Solstollarna	1985
Episode 1	25 min	No Guest(s)	89	Bosse Ringholm gets pied	1997
Episode 2	25 min	No Guest(s)	88	Sven Tumba - Ice-Hockey World Cup	1970
Episode 2	25 min	No Guest(s)	87	Sweden - Soviet Union	1981
Episode 2	25 min	No Guest(s)	86	Bindefeld tries to party in New York City	1995
Episode 2	25 min	No Guest(s)	85	Paul Weller interviewed on Måndagsbörsen	1981
Episode 2	25 min	No Guest(s)	84	Sweden seeks a king	1810
Episode 2	25 min	No Guest(s)	83	Tommy Söderberg carries a hockey bag	2001
Episode 2	25 min	No Guest(s)	82	Skytte theme song	1991
Episode 2	25 min	No Guest(s)	81	Lill-Babs meets her lovers on This Is Your Life	1980
Episode 2	25 min	No Guest(s)	80	Dag Finn in "Okej"	1989
Episode 2	25 min	No Guest(s)	79	Cornelis	1975
Episode 2	25 min	No Guest(s)	78	Ingvar Carlsson dances	1993
Episode 3	25 min	No Guest(s)	77	Bruno Wintzell tries to sing	1992
Episode 3	25 min	No Guest(s)	76	Ulf Lundell stops drinking	1988
Episode 3	25 min	No Guest(s)	75	Sweden's JFK	1968
Episode 3	25 min	No Guest(s)	74	Jonas Berggren	1996
Episode 3	25 min	No Guest(s)	73	Tommy Körberg	1981
Episode 3	25 min	No Guest(s)	72	Popsicle vs Arvingarna	1993
Episode 3	25 min	No Guest(s)	71	Hormoslyr Shot	1975
Episode 3	25 min	No Guest(s)	71b	Berghagen's record	1999
Episode 3	25 min	No Guest(s)	69	Olympics 3000 m Steeplechase final	1976
Episode 3	25 min	No Guest(s)	68	Per Gahrton	1994
Episode 3	25 min	No Guest(s)	67	Tutti frutti	1993
Episode 4	25 min	No Guest(s)	66	Jonas Berggren's girlfriend dancing	1996
Episode 4	25 min	No Guest(s)	65	Louis Armstrong visits Sweden	1933
Episode 4	25 min	No Guest(s)	64	Yngwie Malmsteen releases the fury	1988
Episode 4	25 min	No Guest(s)	63	Tito hurts his hand	1976
Episode 4	25 min	No Guest(s)	62	Skurt disrupts a paper mill	1993
Episode 4	25 min	No Guest(s)	61	Aktuellt premiers	1958
Episode 4	25 min	No Guest(s)	60	Feven's Grammis acceptance speech	2001
Episode 4	25 min	No Guest(s)	59	Forsberg	1994
Episode 4	25 min	No Guest(s)	58	Christer Pettersson celebrates	1989
Episode 4	25 min	No Guest(s)	57	Bruno Wintzell backs up	1988
Episode 4	25 min	No Guest(s)	56	Carl Bildt sings	1988
Episode 5	25 min	No Guest(s)	55	Rasmus Lindwall visits Father Fouras	1992
Episode 5	25 min	No Guest(s)	54	Johnny Ekström turns famous	1984
Episode 5	25 min	No Guest(s)	53	Harald Treutiger in Efter tre	1997
Episode 5	25 min	No Guest(s)	52	Harald Treutiger's marathon broadcast	2003
Episode 5	25 min	No Guest(s)	51	Lenin goes shopping in Stockholm	1917
Episode 5	25 min	No Guest(s)	50	South Africa fiasco	1999
Episode 5	25 min	No Guest(s)	49	Gymping is launched	1983
Episode 5	25 min	No Guest(s)	48	"Loket" calls Rut	1998
Episode 5	25 min	No Guest(s)	47	Niklas Strömstedt vs Hans Shimoda	1995
Episode 5	25 min	No Guest(s)	46	Kay leaves the frame	1988
Episode 6	25 min	No Guest(s)	45	Swedish Metal Aid	1985
Episode 6	25 min	No Guest(s)	44	Götheborg almost makes it back from China	1743
Episode 6	25 min	No Guest(s)	43	KU	1988-89
Episode 6	25 min	No Guest(s)	42	Carl Bildt discusses anal sex	1998
Episode 6	25 min	No Guest(s)	41	The media experiment Nudlar och 08:or	1996
Episode 6	25 min	No Guest(s)	40	Ringholm vs Ahlenius	1999
Episode 6	25 min	No Guest(s)	39	Liza Marklund in sun glasses on the cover of "Prime time"	2002
Episode 6	25 min	No Guest(s)	38	The Zick Zack fiasco	1988
Episode 6	25 min	No Guest(s)	37	Locum wishes Merry Christmas	2001
Episode 6	25 min	No Guest(s)	36	Rafael Diaz the phantom	1986
Episode 6	25 min	No Guest(s)	35	Staffan Lindeborg mistreats Jan-Ove Waldner	2000
Episode 7	25 min	No Guest(s)	34	Jarl Alfredius broadcast from Sarajevo	1993
Episode 7	25 min	No Guest(s)	33	Inga Gill steals on avocado	1989
Episode 7	25 min	No Guest(s)	32	Stockholm bidding for the Olympics	1997
Episode 7	25 min	No Guest(s)	31	Glenn Hysén	1990
Episode 7	25 min	No Guest(s)	30	Sweden gets ready for nuclear weapons	1959
Episode 7	25 min	No Guest(s)	29	Ny Demokrati enters parliament	1991
Episode 7	25 min	No Guest(s)	28	Ralf Edström tipsy on the radio	1988
Episode 7	25 min	No Guest(s)	27	Sweden's Coca-Cola Boycott	1980
Episode 7	25 min	No Guest(s)	26	Ulf Adelsohn buys a cordless phone	1982
Episode 7	25 min	No Guest(s)	25	Mats Wilander releases a single	1991
Episode 7	25 min	No Guest(s)	24	Göran Persson's military portrait is published	1996
Episode 7	25 min	No Guest(s)	23	Peter Wallenberg comments on South Africa	1994
Episode 8	25 min	No Guest(s)	22	Tommy Salo and the Belarus puck	2002
Episode 8	25 min	No Guest(s)	21	Len Pearson	2002
Episode 8	25 min	No Guest(s)	20	Saab JAS 39 Gripen - second attempt	1993
Episode 8	25 min	No Guest(s)	19	Stig Bergling changes name	1986
Episode 8	25 min	No Guest(s)	18	Björn Skifs forgets the lyrics	1978
Episode 8	25 min	No Guest(s)	17	Carl Bildt, 16, protest against disobedience	1966
Episode 8	25 min	No Guest(s)	16	The Swedish Navy finishes itself	1675
Episode 8	25 min	No Guest(s)	15	Tomas Ledin claims he wrote "Snabbköpskassörskan"	2002
Episode 8	25 min	No Guest(s)	14	Kjell-Olof Feldt doodles in parliament	1983
Episode 8	25 min	No Guest(s)	13	Janne Josefsson returns to Fittja	2002
Episode 8	25 min	No Guest(s)	12	Frank Andersson returns from Las Vegas	1984
Episode 8	25 min	No Guest(s)	11	The king visits Arboga	1985
Episode 9	25 min	No Guest(s)	10	Ingemar Stenmark goes downhill	1981
Episode 9	25 min	No Guest(s)	9	Sweden gets a new boy band	1979
Episode 9	25 min	No Guest(s)	8	Martin Dahlin's "mother" visits Rålambshovsparken	1994
Episode 9	25 min	No Guest(s)	7	Aftonbladet reports on a murder	1970
Episode 9	25 min	No Guest(s)	6	Birgit Friggebo and Bildt visits Rinkeby	1992
Episode 9	25 min	No Guest(s)	5	Bosse Larsson admits paying for sex	1995
Episode 9	25 min	No Guest(s)	4	The PM is caught stealing candy	1996
Episode 9	25 min	No Guest(s)	3	The trailer for the film Tre solar	2003
Episode 9	25 min	No Guest(s)	2	Friends in Need releases the single "Alla vi"	1999
Episode 9	25 min	No Guest(s)	1	"The Drop"	1985

Season 2–7 March 2005
Episode #	Running length	Guest(s)
Episode 1	45 min	Kristian Luuk
Episode 2	45 min	Olle Palmlöf
Episode 3	45 min	Henrik Schyffert
Episode 4	45 min	Fadde Darwich, Linda Rosing
Episode 5	45 min	Olle Ljungström
Episode 6	45 min	Fredrik Strage, Thomas Jisander
Episode 7	45 min	Wille Crafoord
Episode 8	45 min	Micke Dubois
Episode 9	45 min	Felix Herngren
Episode 10	45 min	Peter Wahlbeck

Season 3–21 November 2005
Episode #	Running length	Guest(s)
Episode 1	45 min	Martin Timell, Anders Timell
Episode 2	45 min	Robert Gustafsson
Episode 3	45 min	Carina Berg, Fredde Granberg
Episode 4	45 min	Annika Lantz, Jonas Leksell
Episode 5	45 min	David Batra, Johan Glans
Episode 6	45 min	Dogge Doggelito, Mikael Tornving
Episode 7	45 min	Hans Wiklund, Pontus Gårdinger
Episode 8	45 min	Anders and Måns

Season 4 - August 28, 2006
Episode #	Running length	Guest(s)
Episode 1	45 min	
Episode 2	45 min	
Episode 3	45 min	
Episode 4	45 min	
Episode 5	45 min	
Episode 6	45 min	
Episode 7	45 min	
Episode 8	45 min	

Season 5
Episode #	Length	Segment	Guest(s)	a.k.a.
Episode 1	45 min	1	Kjell Söderlund	Disco-Kjelle
Episode 1	45 min	2	Ivan Trygg	Bo-i-bilen-mannen
Episode 1	45 min	3	Bodil Granberg	Djurkvinnan
Episode 1	45 min	4	Jan-Erik Svennberg	Turkietmannen
Episode 1	45 min	5	Gunnar Rydholm	Statistikmannen
Episode 1	45 min	6	Joachim Datorius	Anti-EU-mannen
Episode 2	45 min	1	Thorbjörn Fälldin	f.d. statsminister
Episode 2	45 min	2	Ernold Ivarsson	Körkortsmannen
Episode 2	45 min	3	Ulf Sawert	Prinsessan-Madeleine-Mannen
Episode 2	45 min	4	Clifton Fexmo	Annonsmannen
Episode 2	45 min	5	Sten-Georg	Hockeybröderna
Episode 2	45 min	6	Arne Norse	Skiffle Joe
Episode 3	45 min			
Episode 4	45 min			
Episode 5	45 min			
Episode 6	45 min			
Episode 7	45 min			
Episode 8	45 min			

Season 6–17 March 2008
Episode #	Length	Segment	Guest(s)	a.k.a.
Episode 1	60 min	1	Harold Ivy	Gummimannen
Episode 1	60 min	2	Chris Dennis	Stålmannen
Episode 1	60 min	3	Miriam Schuler	Condom Granma
Episode 1	60 min	4	Colin MacGuire	Big C
Episode 2	60 min	1	Dave Shealey	Skunk-apemannen
Episode 2	60 min	2	Timna Pilch	1700-talskvinnan
Episode 2	60 min	3	Alex Chiu	Odödlighets-mannen
Episode 2	60 min	4	Crazy Carl	Patt-mannen
Episode 3	60 min	1	Jan Wenner	Svidish Kaboj
Episode 3	60 min	2	Frank Moore	Presidentkandidat-mannen
Episode 3	60 min	3	Susan Block	Vicepresident-kvinnan
Episode 3	60 min	4	Howard Solomon	Slott-mannen
Episode 3	60 min	5	Biker Fox	ADHD-mannen
Episode 4	60 min	1	Kenny Irwing	Mannen-som-aldrig-vill-bli-stor-mannen
Episode 4	60 min	2	Helen Jenkins	Hisskvinnan
Episode 4	60 min	3	Steve Sipek	Amerikanska definitionen av husdjur
Episode 4	60 min	4	David Johnson	Buskmannen
Episode 5	60 min	1	Tim Dunden	Regnskogsmannen
Episode 5	60 min	2	Lory & George	(Griskvinnan/GQ Man-of-the-year)
Episode 5	60 min	3	Tony	(Klockmannen)
Episode 5	60 min	4	Frank Chu	Skyltmannen
Episode 5	60 min	5	Leonard Knight	Älska-gud-mannen
Episode 5	60 min	6	Mike Ricardi	Negligémannen
Episode 6	60 min	1	Stanley Marsh	Konstnärsmannen
Episode 6	60 min	2	LBK	Kreativitetsmannen
Episode 6	60 min	3	Mike Meadows	Generalen
Episode 6	60 min	4	Annabelle & Harley	Redneck-paret
Episode 6	60 min	5	Morris Hoven	Miss Loretta
Episode 6	60 min	6	Anvil Shooting	Good ol' boys
Episode 7	60 min	1	Mark & Mike	American movie-killarna
Episode 7	60 min	2	Money Banks	R.Kelly-mannen
Episode 7	60 min	3	Linda Lee	Bruce Lee's sister
Episode 7	60 min	4	Johan Renck	
Episode 7	60 min	5	Franklin Ruehl	Jag-har-en-framtid-i-showbiz-mannen
Episode 8	90 min	Finale	Harold Ivy (Gummimannen); LBK (Kreativitetsmannen); Mike Ricardi (Negligémannen); Kenny Irwing (Mannen-som-aldrig- vill-bli-stor-mannen)	The Finalists
Episode 8	90 min	Finale	Edwin Johnson (Sminkmannen); Hugo Bergström (Indianmannen); Jan Myrehed (Entertainermannen); Sten ”Taxi” Jonsson	The Jury

== See also ==
- 100 höjdare at IMDb
- Official homepage of 100 höjdare at Discovery+
