= Bo Hanson =

Bo Hanson may refer to:

- Bosse Hansson (born 1933), Swedish sports journalist
- Bo Hansson (1943–2010), Swedish musician
- Bo Hanson (Left Behind), a fictional character in the Left Behind novels
- Bo Hanson (rower) (born 1973), Australian Olympic rower
- Bo Hansen (born 1972), Danish footballer
