= Pretty Belinda =

- German 7" vinyl single cover

Single by Chris Andrews

from the album Heart to Heart - All the Hits and More
- A-side: "Pretty Belinda"
- B-side: "Make No Mistake"
- Released: July 1969
- Genre: Pop
- Songwriter: Chris Andrews
- Producer: Lene Marlin

Chris Andrews singles chronology
"Stop That Girl" (1966)	"Pretty Belinda" (1969)	"Carole OK" (1970)

"Pretty Belinda" is a song written and recorded by Chris Andrews, which he released as a single in July 1969.

== Commercial success ==
The single did not enter the UK singles charts but it reached the No. 1 spot in Austria and peaked at No. 3 in Germany. It was released in South Africa in December 1969, where it peaked at No. 1. Andrews's follow-up single Carole OK was less successful but also reached No. 1 in South Africa where it was released in April 1970. In 1969, the Italian singer Gianni Morandi took the Italian version (Bella Belinda) to number one in the Italian 45 rpm charts. A 1970 Ola Håkansson recording, "Söta Belinda", was released as a single. scoring a Svensktoppen hit for 11 weeks between 26 July-4 October 1970, peaking at position 3.

== Chart history ==
=== Weekly charts ===
Chart (1969–1970)	Peak position
Austria (Disc Parade)	1
Netherlands (Dutch Top 40)	8
Netherlands (Single Top 100)	8
New Zealand (Listener)	10
Norway (VG-lista)	3
South Africa (Springbok Radio)	1
Sweden (Kvällstoppen)	1
Sweden (Tio i Topp)	1
Rhodesia (Lyons Maid)	2
West Germany (Media Control)	5

=== Year-end charts ===
Chart (1969)	Peak position
Austria (Disc Parade)	2
Netherlands (Dutch Top 40)	59
West Germany (Media Control)	8

Chart (1970)	Peak position
South Africa (Springbok Radio)	1
Sweden (Tio i Topp)	2

== In popular culture ==
The song was used as theme music for Filip och Fredrik's Swedish tv series 100 höjdare, aired from 2004 to 2008. That version was performed by accordionist Roland Cedermark.
