= Fadde Darwich =

Swedish comedian (born 1966)

Fadde Darwich (born May 5, 1966, in Qamishli, Syria) is a Swedish stand-up comedian and former security officer at the public central square Stureplan. Darwich was together with the model Emma Withers and also had a highly publicized relationship with Linda Thelenius. He is often a topic of discussion in the leading Swedish tabloid Aftonbladet.

== Biography ==
Darwich was born in 1966 in Qamishli, Syria, into a Kurdish family, and then immigrated to Sweden.

Darwich quit Spy Bar after making statements about racism in the restaurant industry, mainly at Stureplan.

On April 18, 2007, Darwich was arrested for financial crime, accused of using black money (SEK 2.4-3 million) for, among other things, salary payments. He was sentenced for this to one year and four months in prison. Darwich made a documentary some years ago for Swedish Television before he became notorious for the relationship with the former Big Brother contestant Linda Rosing (now known as Linda Thelenius). During the summer of 2007, the two also recorded a net-soap-project called "The Bitch Tour, med Linda och Fadde". The plan was to film up to 20 episodes. In the end only three episodes were filmed and shown.

In 2008, Darwich's autobiographical book Fadde – Min story was published after collaboration with the author Lasse Jansson. Darwich inaugurated Rockbjörnen's 30th anniversary in 2009 together with Ebbot from The Soundtrack of Our Lives. In March 2010, Darwich debuted as a stand-up comedian. In May 2010, he released the single "We Can Party".

Nowadays, Darwich works as a personal trainer and restaurant consultant.
