= Linda Thelenius =

Swedish glamour model and singer (born 1974)

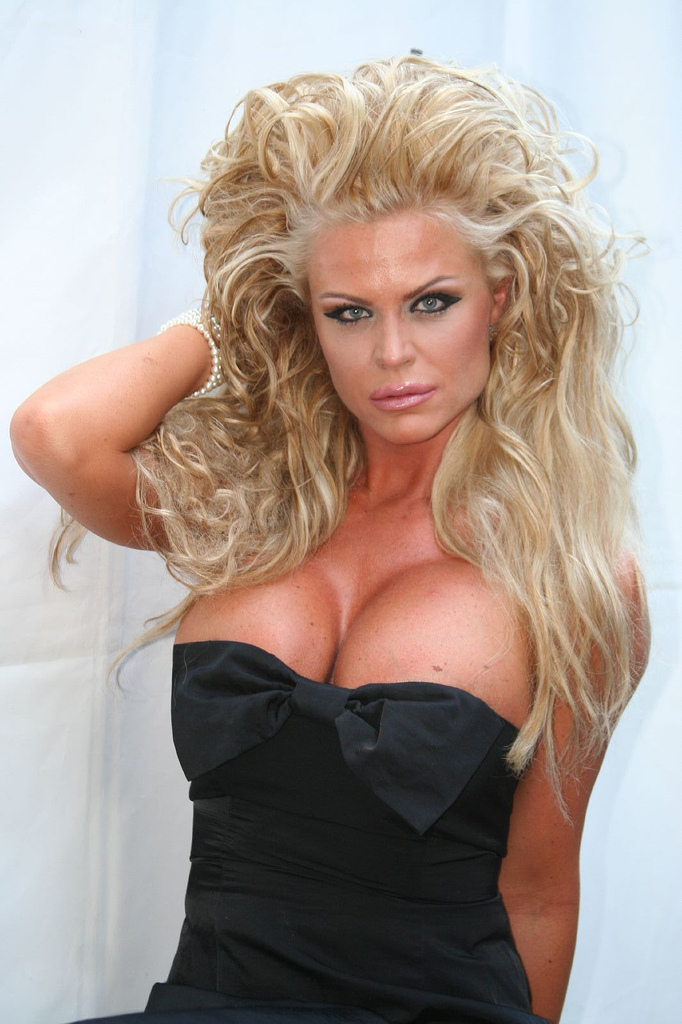
- Linda Thelenius during Stockholm Pride 2007
- Born: 21 January 1974 (age 51); Västerås, Sweden
- Occupations: Glamour model, singer

Linda Maria Elisabeth Thelenius (born Linda Gedin, 21 January 1974), also known as Linda Rosing) is a Swedish glamour model and singer. Thelenius (then Rosing) became known in Sweden when she was a housemate on Big Brother 2003; she has since released a book, been a party leader for the Unique Party and participated in several other reality shows. She was born in Västerås and has been married to Basic Element singer Peter Thelenius since 2010.

== Career ==
=== Reality series ===
Thelenius became familiar to Swedish TV viewers as a housemate on Big Brother in 2003; the series was aired on Kanal5 where she made headlines for having sex on live television. She also worked as a glamour model after her stint on Big Brother for men's magazines such as Slitz. She is, according to her own statement, in the running to have a spread in the American version of Playboy. She took part in Michael Brinkenstjärna's television show Team Paparazzia along with Meral Tasbas. In 2009, she got her own dating show on Kanal5 called Den rätte för Rosing. In 2008, she was on the game show Sanningens Ögonblick and on Wipeout in 2009. Thelenius along with her daughter Melissa went on the paranormal show Det Okända on Sjuan in 2011 to get help with ghostly activity in their apartment.

=== Pop music ===
Thelenius released her first music single "Summer Love" in 2004, but the song did not chart. At the end of 2006, Thelenius revealed to the media that she would have another try at music under the new name Bionda. Her first music single under that name, "Forget Me, Forget Me Not", was released on 12 December that year. To avoid a court battle with the 1970s Italian band La Bionda, Thelenius decided to change her name legally to Linda Bionda.

Thelenius stated in April 2007 to Aftonbladet newspaper that she would not continue pursuing music. However, a few months later she revealed that she would participate in a yet unnamed country's national selection for the Eurovision Song Contest, a statement she later retracted as she claimed she did not want to perform and sing live.

=== Politician ===
On 3 August 2006, Thelenus declared she would dedicate herself to politics and become the party leader of the newly formed Swedish Unique Party. According to Aftonbladet, Thelenius brought in 203,000 ballots with 255,000 being the needed minimum to make it through the 4% barrier to the Riksdag, the Swedish national legislative assembly (Parliament).

At the 2006 election, the Unique Party got 222 votes. In an interview with Svenska Dagbladet, Thelenius stated that her party was satisfied with the result and that she would continue to be the party's leader. But on 9 April 2008, Thelenius wrote in her blog that she had never taken the project seriously and that there never were serious plans to make it to the Riksdagen. She claimed to have come up with the name for the party herself.

=== Film ===
On 23 May 2007, Thelenius told in an interview that she had signed a four-year contract with the pornographic producers Private Media Group which told that they had bought Thelenius an apartment in Barcelona. The company is owned by Berth Milton. It was said that she would move there to play and film a pornographic film and work as a PR model for Privates own clothes collection. In another interview on 27 June 2007, Thelenius declared that she had not accepted the offer in the end and declined to travel to Barcelona and that she would not be doing any pornographic material.

=== The Bitch Tour ===
During the summer of 2007, Thelenius along with her then boyfriend Fadde Darwich recorded a net-soap-project called "The Bitch Tour, med Linda och Fadde". The plan was to film 20 episodes. In the end only three episodes were filmed and shown on the couples' personal website.

== Personal life ==
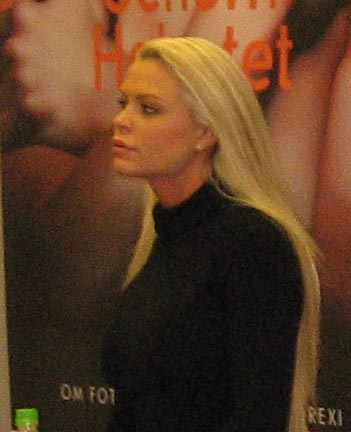
Thelenius at the 2006 Gothenburg book fair

In 2006, Thelenius made her debut as an author with the autobiography Den nakna sanningen which she co-wrote along with host and journalist Daniel Nyhlén.

On 20 December 2007, she was arrested at the Mera Bar in Norrlandsgatan, Stockholm. She was taken to the station for drug testing and was given a citation for narcotic use. She confessed to using cocaine in an interview with Expressen newspaper the day after.

Thelenius has one daughter and one son from two previous relationships. She had a relationship with Fadde Darwich. On 7 December 2009 Thelenius and her husband Peter Thelenius, the lead singer of the music group Basic Element gave birth to the couple first child a son. The couple got married on 24 July 2010 at that time Linda changed her last name from Rosing to Thelenius. She is also completed a course to become a flight attendant.

Thelenius had told media that she did her first surgery to enlarge her breasts at the age of 23. She has also said she has done surgery on her lips to make them bigger. But that she today regrets making the surgeries.

== Discography ==
- 2004 – "Summer Love"
- 2006 – "Forget Me, Forget Me Not" (credited as Bionda)

== Bibliography ==
- 2006: Den nakna sanningen (as Linda Rosing. Co-written with Daniel Nyhlén) ISBN 9789185499274
