= Roland Cedermark =

Swedish accordionist (1938–2020)

- Born: 23 April 1938; Älvros, Sweden
- Died: 24 December 2020 (aged 82) Valsta, Sweden
- Instruments: accordion
- Website: https://www.roland-cedermark.se

Roland Cedermark (23 April 1938 – 24 December 2020) was a Swedish musician (accordionist). He was born in Älvros and made his solo debut in 1976. He sold over 2 million records in Sweden. Amongst his hits were "Vandra varsamt" in 2010, "Någon behöver dej" in 1997 and "Whispering" in 1977.

== Biography ==
Roland Cedermark came from a family of musicians, where, among other things, his grandfather was a fiddler from Härjedalen. Cedermark himself was conductor of the dance band Cedermarks from 1958 until 1973.

He made his record debut as a solo artist in 1976, and has since sold more than 2 million copies of his records, of which as many as 12 have sold gold. His album is still released on cassette tape, as he especially addresses the older audience. Most recently during the 1990s and in the early 2000s, he had melodies at Svensktoppen.

Cedermark appeared in many TV programs, including Nygammalt and various café programs, and most recently in the vignette for the fourth, fifth and sixth seasons of the TV program 100 höjdare. In 1994, he was appointed Filipstad's ambassador.

Cedermark died in Valsta, aged 82.
