= Lars-Gunnar Björklund =

Swedish sports journalist (1937-2012)

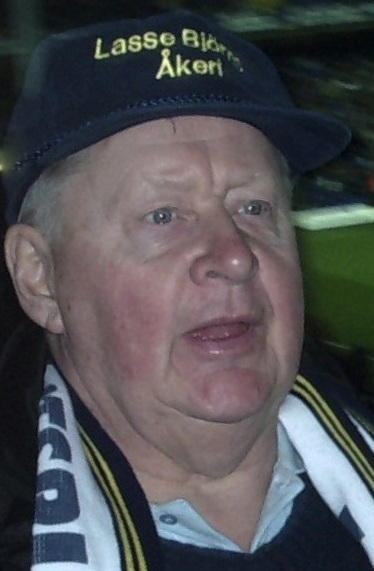
- Lars-Gunnar Björklund in December 2003
- Born: 24 February 1937 (age 89); Stockholm, Sweden
- Died: 30 November 2012 (aged 75); Stockholm, Sweden
- Occupation: Sports journalist
- Spouse: Lena Ekvall (m. 1964)
- Children: 2

Lars-Gunnar Björklund (24 February 1937 – 30 November 2012) was a Swedish radio and TV journalist. He was famous as a sports reporter, especially reporting from Vasaloppet and the Ice Hockey World Championships.

== Early life ==
Björklund was born on 24 February 1937 in Stockholm, Sweden, the son of Oscar Björklund, a tram driver, and his wife Gerda. He passed studentexamen in 1957 and conducted university studies in Stockholm in 1962 and studied television at New York University in New York City in 1963. Björklund also attended the Adolf Fredrik's Music School in Stockholm. He played handball for Djurgårdens IF.

== Career ==
Björklund worked as an editor at Sveriges Radio from 1958 to 1979, and as marketing director at AB Tipstjänst from 1979 to 1995. He was then Director Corporate Affairs at Tipstjänst/Svenska Spel from 1996 to 1998, and at LGB Publicity AB.

He was an important part of Sweden's first TV sports editorial team, where he recruited employees such as Arne Hegerfors, Fredrik Belfrage and Ingvar Oldsberg. During the 1970s, he then became a well-known face for Tipsextra, and was awarded, among other things, as the first sports journalist the Stora Journalistpriset in radio and television.

Björklund hosted the TV show Supersvararna in Sveriges Television from 1988.

== Personal life ==
In 1964, Björklund married secretary/script supervisor Lena Ekvall (born 1942), the daughter of Einar Ekvall and Brita (née Nygren). They had two sons.

== Selected bibliography ==
- Björklund, Lars-Gunnar (2006). Minnesluckor: livsstycken och klacksparkar (in Swedish). Stockholm: Kulturhistoriska bokförlaget. ISBN 9197574910. SELIBR 10146792.
- Björklund, Lars-Gunnar (2004). Sporten i dag 2004-2005 (in Swedish). Bokförlaget Semic. ISBN 9789155231880. LIBRIS: 5h9813b330krm1m3.
- Björklund, Lars-Gunnar (2003). Sporten i dag 2003. Sporten i dag (in Swedish). Bokförlaget Semic. ISBN 9789155211943. LIBRIS: 8kj020qh6k6k5q86.
- Björklund, Lars-Gunnar (2002). Sporten i dag 2002-2003 (in Swedish). Bokförlaget Semic. ISBN 9789155210304. LIBRIS: lwvbdb0pj1wstxx4.
- Björklund, Lars-Gunnar; Anrell, Lasse (2002). Salt Lake City 2002 (in Swedish). Västerås: Sportförl. ISBN 91-88541-44-4. SELIBR 8449038.
- Björklund, Lars-Gunnar; Hansson, Bo; Persson, Gunnar (1998). VM i fotboll 1998 Frankrike (in Swedish). Vällingby: Strömberg/Brunnhage. ISBN 91-86184-51-2. SELIBR 7755724.
- Björklund, Lars-Gunnar; Hansson, Bo; Persson, Gunnar, eds. (1994). VM i fotboll 1994 USA (in Swedish). Stockholm: Strömberg/Brunnhage. ISBN 91-86184-43-1. SELIBR 7755720.
- Björklund, Lars-Gunnar; Hansson, Bo; Persson, Gunnar, eds. (1990). VM i fotboll 1990 Italien (in Swedish). Stockholm: Strömberg/Brunnhage. ISBN 91-86184-37-7. SELIBR 7755716.
- Björklund, Lars-Gunnar, ed. (1985). Små, små ord om människor: [600] aforismer (in Swedish). Stockholm: Idéförl. ISBN 91-7890-005-0. SELIBR 7672582.
- Hansson, Bo; Björklund, Lars-Gunnar, eds. (1982). VM i fotboll 1982 Spanien (in Swedish). Stockholm: Nestor. SELIBR 380244.
- Björklund, Lars-Gunnar; Andersö, Anders (1977). En rund själ i en rund kropp (in Swedish). Stockholm: Askild & Kärnekull. ISBN 9170088438. SELIBR 7589772.
- Björklund, Lars-Gunnar (1968). Dessa fantastiska Fåglums: [Gösta, Erik, Sture och Tomas Pettersson] (in Swedish). Stockholm: Åhlén & Åkerlund. LIBRIS: 1273630.
- Björklund, Lars-Gunnar; Uddebom, Erik (1967). Match!: frågor om sport (in Swedish). Stockholm: Geber. SELIBR 1273633.
