= Birger Jarlsgatan =

Street in central Stockholm, Sweden

Coordinates: 59°20′28″N 18°03′53″E

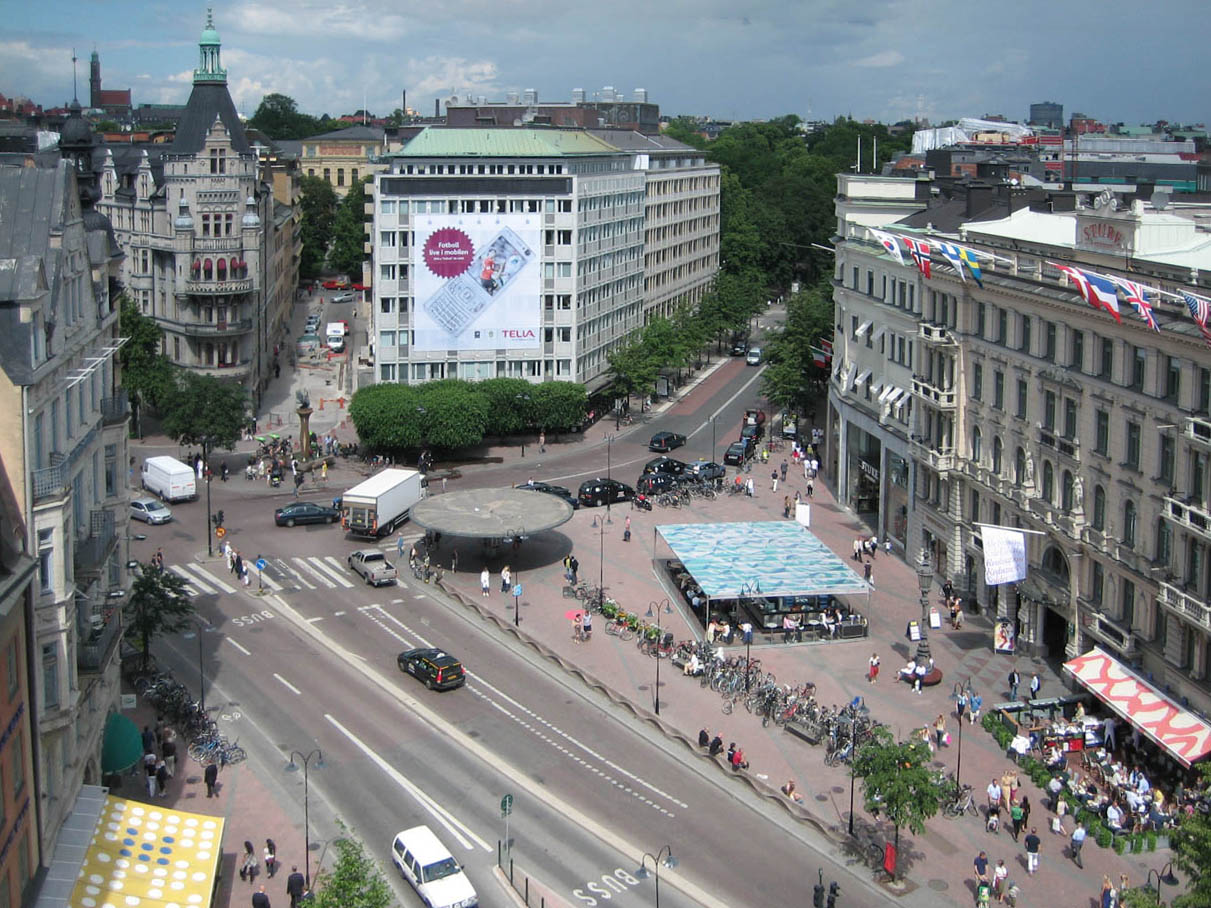
Birger Jarlsgatan passing by Stureplan in 2007.

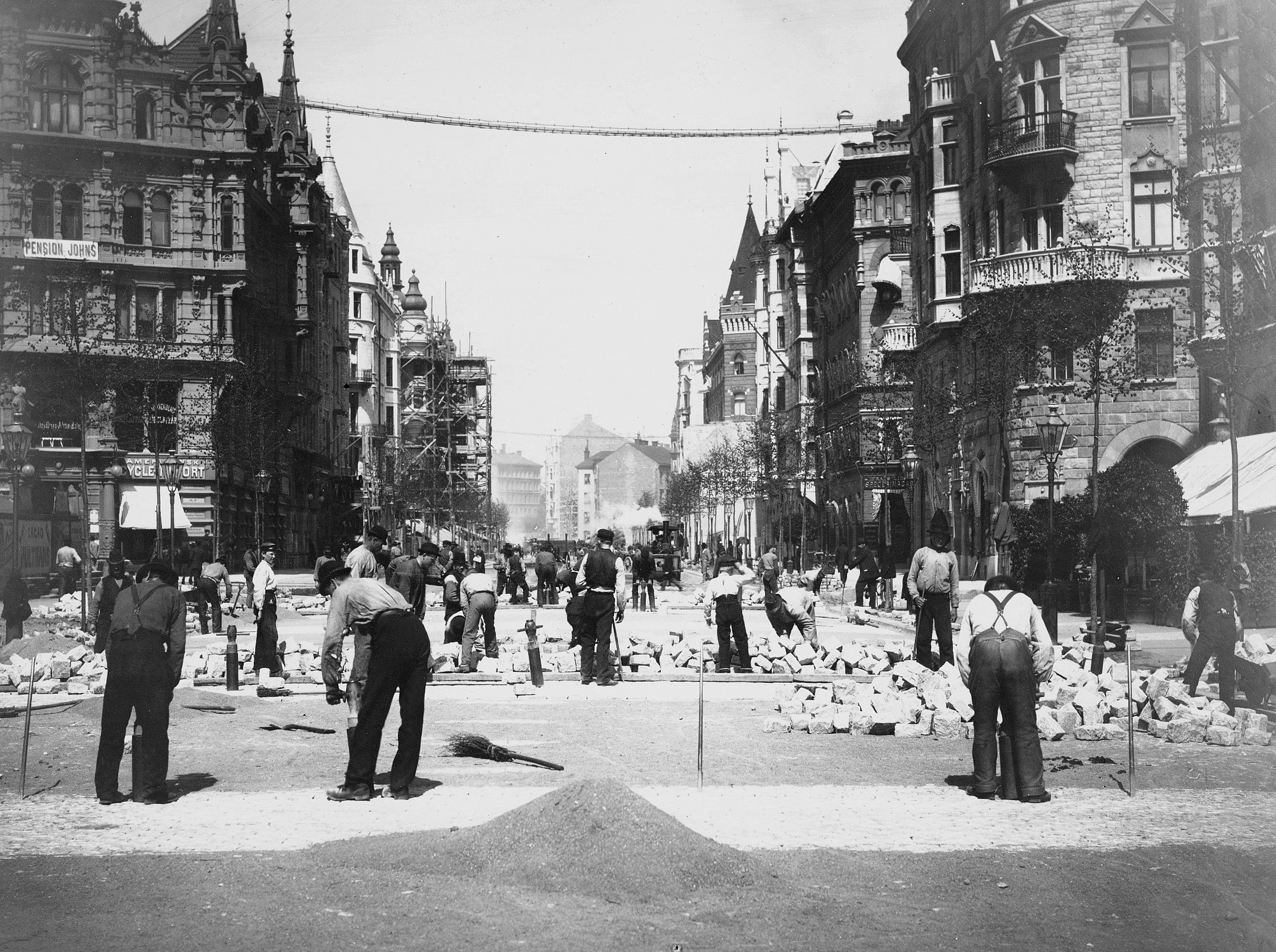
Birger Jarlsgatan under construction in 1898.

Birger Jarlsgatan is one of the longest streets in central Stockholm, Sweden. The street forms the border between Östermalm and the two neighbouring districts Norrmalm and Vasastaden.

It is named after Birger Jarl since 1885, then "Birger Jarls gata" (gata meaning "street"). The contemporary spelling has been used since 1932.

Stureplan and Balettakademien are situated on Birger Jarlsgatan. The street has many well-known restaurants, bars and clubs, some of which are popular among celebrities, as well as stores selling tourist-oriented gewgaws.

== See also ==
- Geography of Stockholm
