= Stureplan =

Square in Stockholm

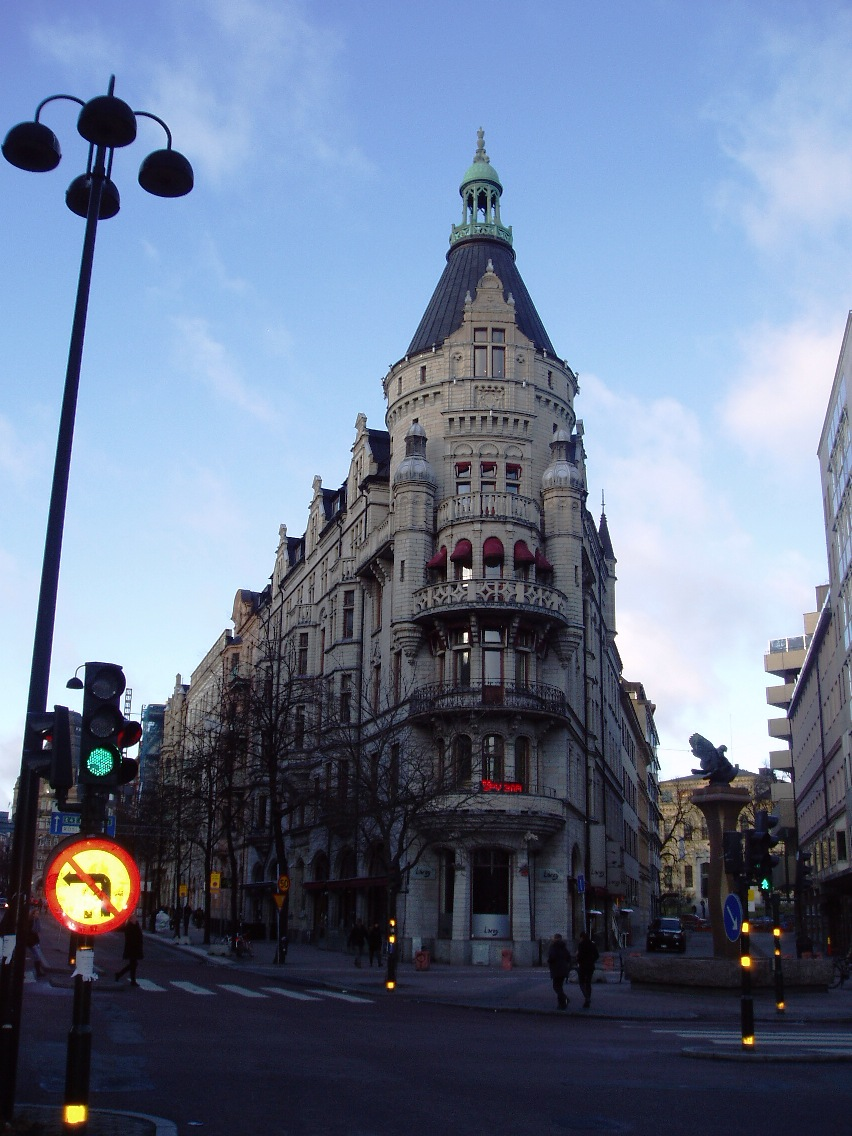
Spy Bar, in the Daneliuska huset, one of Stockholm's most famous nightclubs for celebrities

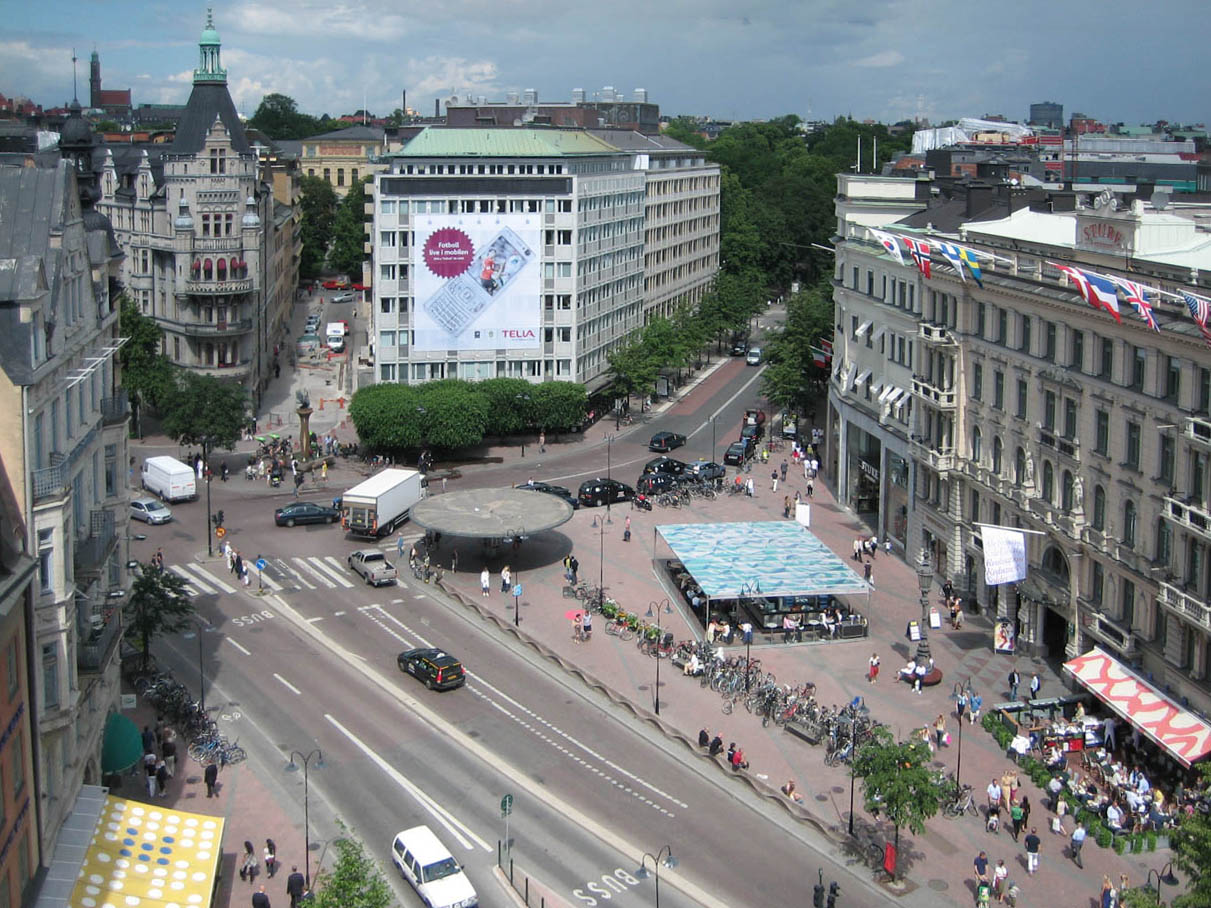
Stureplan in 2007.

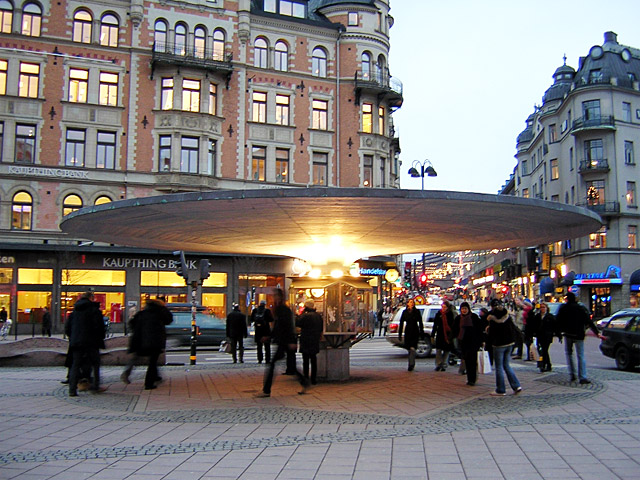
"Svampen" (the Mushroom) at Stureplan, a popular meeting place.

Stureplan is a public square in central Stockholm, between Norrmalm and Östermalm. The square connects the major streets Kungsgatan, Birger Jarlsgatan and Sturegatan. The buildings around the square house offices of banks and other financial institutions, as well as several corporate headquarters.

Some of the country's most famous and expensive restaurants and bars are located in the area around Stureplan. Some examples are Sturehof, Spy Bar, Riche, Laroy, Hell's Kitchen, East and Sturecompagniet. During the later half of the 20th century however, the scene started to change, increasing rents forcing many old shops to shut down or relocate, the oldest, after more than 100 years in business, were subsequently replaced by more or less fitting successors marketing tourist-oriented gewgaws.

In Sweden, Stureplan has also become a well-known symbol for exclusivity since the major refurbishments during the 1980s. Known as an area with many expensive, luxurious bars and restaurants, it is considered a playground for upper-class youth, celebrities, young business executives and some of the Swedish royal family.

Close to Stureplan is the park Humlegården with the National Library of Sweden. Stureplan is connected to Östermalmstorg metro station of the Stockholm Metro.
