= Jarl Alfredius =

Swedish journalist (1943–2009)

- Jarl Alfredius
- Born: Jarl Martin Alfredius; 3 January 1943; Solna, Sweden
- Died: 31 March 2009 (aged 66); Stockholm, Sweden
- Occupations: Journalist, newsreader
- Spouse: Lena Löfgren (m. 1981)

Jarl Martin Alfredius (3 January 1943 – 31 March 2009) was a Swedish journalist and newsreader at Swedish Television.

== Early life ==
Alfredius was born on 3 January 1943 in Solna, Sweden, the son of Martin Alfredius and his wife Märta (née Hjelm). He received a Bachelor of Arts degree in 1967 and attended the Journalisthögskolan i Stockholm in 1969.

== Career ==
Alfredius worked at Sveriges Radio's central editorial office from 1970 to 1972, and at Stockholms-Nytt 1972 to 1973, as well as Dagens Eko from 1973 to 1986. He presented Aktuellt in Sveriges Television (SVT) from 1986.

Alfredius also did TV shows for the Kunskapskanalen in 2004. He remained a news presenter at SVT until July 2008, when he was diagnosed with prostate cancer.

== Personal life ==
In 1981, Alfredius married Lena Löfgren (born 1954), the daughter of editor Åke Löfgren and editor Maud (née Grunell).

== Death ==
Alfredius died aged 66 on 31 March 2009 in Stockholm, due to complications from his disease.
