= Michael Brinkenstjärna =

Swedish talent manager

Michael Brinkenstjärna (born 23 February 1966) is a Swedish DJ, musician and talent manager. He grew up in Furulund in Kävlinge Municipality, Skåne, southern Sweden.

He started out as a DJ in the 1980s. As a talent manager, he represented Aqua and Leila K among other artists. In 2012, he published a book about his talent manager career, Ett jävla liv.
