= Olle Palmlöf =

Swedish comedian

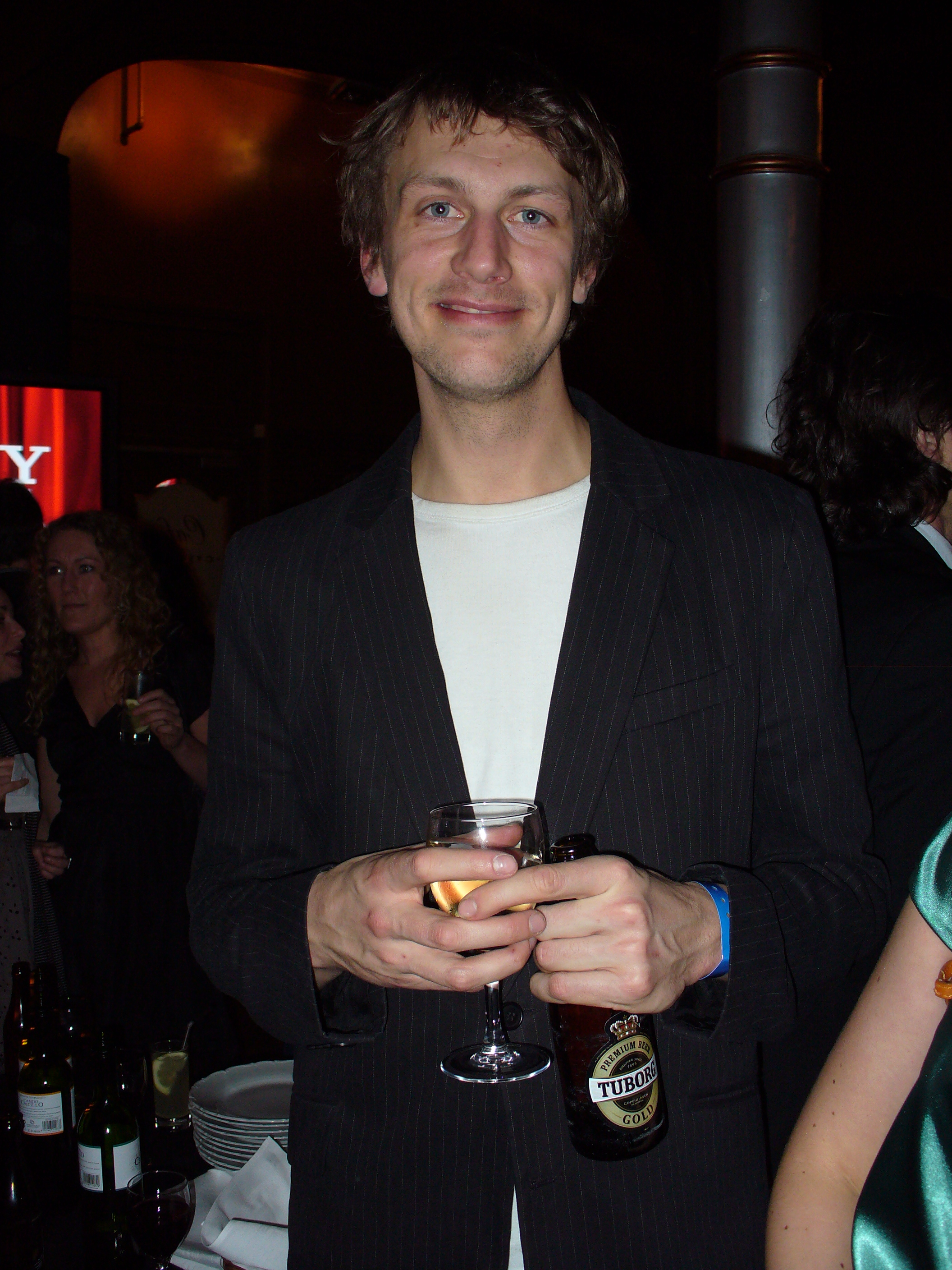
Olle Palmlöf

Nils Olof (Olle) Palmlöf (born 7 October 1972 in Stockholm, Sweden) is a Swedish comedian and radio and television show host.

Palmlöf's first success came with the radioshow Pippirull in Swedish Radio P3 where he phoned various Swedish celebrities and was rude to them.

His career on TV began with the show CP-magasinet on SVT together with Jonas Franksson for which they won Stora Journalistpriset in 2004. Later he also hosted the TV-show Faktum.
