= Bosse Hansson =

Swedish television journalist

Bo Hansson
- Born: Bo Gunnar Hansson; 20 December 1933 (age 92); Jönköping, Sweden
- Education: University of Gothenburg
- Occupations: Sports journalist, television presenter
- Years active: 1957–1990s

Bo Gunnar Hansson, publicly known as Bosse Hansson (born 20 December 1933) is a Swedish television journalist and sports broadcaster.

== Early life ==
Hansson was born on 20 December 1933 in Ljungarum Parish, Jönköping Municipality, Sweden, the son of Gerald Hansson, an office manager, and his wife Dagny (née Ahnberg). He passed studentexamen in 1953 and studied at the University of Gothenburg between 1954 and 1957.

== Career ==
Hansson worked at Idrottsbladet from 1957 to 1962, at Strömbergs förlag from 1962 to 1965 and at Radiosporten, the sport section of Sveriges Radio from 1965 to 1969, before switching to Sveriges Television (SVT) in 1969.

As a journalist he has covered several international sporting events such as the FIFA World Cup and the Olympics. He was the live commentary when Thomas Ravelli saved the decisive penalty in the 1994 World Cup quarter final penalty shootout between Sweden and Romania; a moment that was later dubbed the biggest Swedish sports moment of the 20th century.

== Controversies ==
Racialist controversy arose in 2012 when he sat in the commentator booth at Råsunda Stadium and was heard saying 'not another black player' in a derogatory manner to an AIK substitution.

In early 2019, Hansson was arrested in Florida, United States, for allegedly groping a 13-year-old boy on a playground.

== Bibliography ==
- Björklund, Lars-Gunnar; Hansson, Bo; Persson, Gunnar (1998). VM i fotboll 1998 Frankrike (in Swedish). Vällingby: Strömberg/Brunnhage. ISBN 91-86184-51-2. SELIBR 7755724.
- Björklund, Lars-Gunnar; Hansson, Bo; Persson, Gunnar, eds. (1994). VM i fotboll 1994 USA (in Swedish). Stockholm: Strömberg/Brunnhage. ISBN 91-86184-43-1. SELIBR 7755720.
- Björklund, Lars-Gunnar; Hansson, Bo; Persson, Gunnar, eds. (1990). VM i fotboll 1990 Italien (in Swedish). Stockholm: Strömberg/Brunnhage. ISBN 91-86184-37-7. SELIBR 7755716.
- Hansson, Bo; Björklund, Lars-Gunnar, eds. (1982). VM i fotboll 1982 Spanien (in Swedish). Stockholm: Nestor. SELIBR 380244.
