= Det bästa från Idol =

Swedish compilation album series

Det bästa från Idol is a series of annual releases from the Swedish Idol music competition series.

== Albums ==
(Names of series winners in bold)

=== Det bästa från Idol 2004 ===
Det bästa från Idol 2004

Compilation album by Idol 2004 contestants
- Released: 17 November 2004
- Recorded: 2004
- Genre: Cover
- Label: RCA Records

BMG decided to release an album with the eleven finalists from Idol 2004 on 17 November 2004, already before the contest was over and a winner had been named. The record label stated that not everyone would favour the eventual winner, but savour other contestants. Among others, the compilation album was promoted with shopping mall concerts; 6,800 fans showed up at Heron City in Huddinge.

According to the Swedish Recording Industry Association, Det bästa från Idol 2004 was the 19th highest-selling album in Sweden in 2004, and the 4th highest-selling album by various artists.

=== Reception ===
Sydsvenskan gave the album a score of 3, reckoning that two of the musical highlights from the television show translated well to the record: "Danin Zanyar sings Toni Braxton's 'Un-Break My Heart' and Nathalie Schmeikal does Bonnie Tyler's 'Total Eclipse Of The Heart' so the hair on the arms stand up".

TT gave 2 stars. Starting with the observation that most contestants lacked the "charisma, class and voice" to become stars, the album would have benefitted if only Daniel Lindström, Cornelia Dahlgren and Darin Zanyar sang "almost all the song". The "large majority should begin to prepare themselves on their fifteen minutes in the limelight having passed".

The lowest score of 1 was given by several press outlets. Svenska Dagbladet wrote that the album was "revelating" of the low musical level and "mediocre vocal talent" found within Idol. Arbetarbladet criticized the "low budget production", reminiscient of karaoke bar music, and called the album "trash" and "incredibly lousy". Västerbottens Folkblad called it "hastily thrown-together soup" with a "plastic" musical backing. Piteå-Tidningen called the cover versions "watery", and the album "not more exciting than OK's average cassette with car stereo hits from the early 80s".

=== Tracklist ===
1. All finalists – "Ain't No Mountain High Enough" by Marvin Gaye & Tammi Terrell
2. Lorén Talhaoui – "Vill ha dej" by Freestyle
3. **Daniel Lindström** – "If You Don't Know Me By Now" by Harold Melvin & the Blue Notes
4. Geraldo Sandell – "I Want You Back" by The Jackson 5
5. Nathalie Schmeikal – "Total Eclipse of the Heart" by Bonnie Tyler
6. Paul Lötberg – "Hos Dig Är Jag Underbar" by Patrik Isaksson
7. Cornelia Dahlgren – "What It Feels Like for a Girl" by Madonna
8. Alex Falk – "Celebration" by Kool & the Gang
9. Darin Zanyar – "Un-Break My Heart" by Toni Braxton
10. Stina Joelsson – "Torn" by Natalie Imbruglia
11. Fillip Williams – "Under ytan" by Uno Svenningsson
12. Angel J. Hansson – "Hello" by Lionel Richie
13. All finalists – "Larger Than Life" by Backstreet Boys

=== My Own Idol - Idol 2005 ===
My Own Idol 2005

Compilation album by Idol 2005 contestants
- Released: 19 October 2005
- Recorded: 2005
- Genre: Cover
- Label: Columbia

1. Måns Zelmerlöw - "Millennium" by Robbie Williams
2. Jonah Hallberg - "Hard To Say I'm Sorry" by Az Yet
3. **Agnes Carlsson** - "My Everything" by Jennifer Brown
4. Sebastian Karlsson - "It's Only Rock'n Roll" by The Rolling Stones
5. Marième Niang - "As" George Michael & Mary J. Blige
6. Ola Svensson - "My All" by Mariah Carey
7. Elina Nelson - "Torn" by Natalie Imbruglia
8. Cindy Lamréus - "A Moment Like This" by Kelly Clarkson
9. Jens Pääjärvi - "Let Me Entertain You" by Robbie Williams
10. Maria Albayrak - "Truly Madly Deeply" by Savage Garden
11. Sibel Redžep - "Imagine" by John Lennon

=== Det bästa från Idol 2006 ===
Det bästa från Idol 2006

Compilation album by Idol 2006 contestants
- Released: 16 November 2006
- Recorded: 2006
- Genre: Cover
- Label: Columbia

1. Erik Segerstedt - "I Don't Wanna Be" by Gavin Degraw
2. Felicia Brandström - "Put Your Records On" by Corinne Bailey Rae
3. **Markus Fagervall** - "She Will Be Loved" by Maroon 5
4. Jessica Myrberg - "I Love Rock 'n' Roll" by Joan Jett
5. Johan Larsson "Real to Me" by Brian McFadden
6. Sara Burnett - "Forever Young" by Alphaville
7. Natalie Kadric - "Ain't No Other Man" by Christina Aguilera
8. Danny Saucedo - "Öppna din dörr" by Tommy Nilsson
9. Linda Seppänen - "Sunday Morning" by No Doubt
10. Jonas Snäckmark - "Here Without You" by 3 Doors Down
11. Cissi Ramsby - "Not Ready to Make Nice" by Dixie Chicks
12. Idol 2006 Allstars - "The Final Countdown" by Europe

=== Det bästa från Idol 2007 ===
Det bästa från Idol 2007

Compilation album by Idol 2007 contestants
- Released: 21 November 2007
- Recorded: 2007
- Genre: Cover
- Label: Columbia

1. Idol 2007 Allstars - "Free Your Mind"
2. Christoffer Hiding - "Say It Right"
3. Evelina Sewerin - "For Your Eyes Only"
4. Daniel Karlsson - "You're the Voice"
5. Amanda Jenssen - "Look What They've Done to My Song"
6. Mattias Andréasson - "Your Song"
7. Anastasia Roobol - "Sleeping Satellite"
8. Sam Hagberth - "Tired of Being Sorry"
9. Gathania Holmgren - "Walking on Sunshine"
10. **Marie Picasso** - "Flashdance... What a Feeling"
11. Andreas Sjöberg - "I Wanna Know What Love Is"
12. Patrizia Helander - "Hurt"

=== Det bästa från Idol 2008 ===
Det bästa från Idol 2008

Compilation album by Idol 2008 contestants
- Released: 12 December 2008
- Recorded: 2008
- Genre: Cover
- Label: Sony Music

1. **Kevin Borg** - "Gimme Gimme Gimme"
2. Alice Svensson - "These Words"
3. Lars Eriksson - "One"
4. Anna Bergendahl - "Nothing Compares 2 U"
5. Johan Palm - "Beautiful Ones"
6. Sepideh Vaziri - "I Will Survive"
7. Robin Bengtsson - "Mercy"
8. Loulou Lamotte - "Love Me Still"
9. Jesper Blomberg - "So Sick"
10. Yazmina Simic - "Don't Stop the Music"
11. Robin Ericsson - "I Surrender"
12. Idol 2008 Allstars - "Thank You For the Music"

=== Det bästa från Idol 2009 ===
Det bästa från Idol 2009

Compilation album by Idol 2009 contestants
- Released: 18 November 2009
- Recorded: 2009
- Genre: Cover

1. **Erik Grönwall** - "18 and Life"
2. Eddie Razaz - "Man In the Mirror"
3. Rabih Jaber - "You Are Not Alone"
4. Karolina Brånsgård - "This Is a Man's World"
5. Tove Östman Styrke - "Hot N Cold"
6. Calle Kristiansson - "Walking in Memphis"
7. Reza Ningtyas Lindh - "Son of a Preacher Man"
8. Camilla Håkansson - "Human Nature"
9. Mariette Hansson - "Dear Mister President"
10. Erika Selin - "About You Now"
11. Nicklas Hocker - "Black Hole Sun"
12. Idol Allstars 2009 - "I Wish Everyday Could Be Like Christmas"

=== Det bästa från Idol 2010 – Audition ===
Det bästa från Idol 2010 – Audition

Compilation album by Idol 2010 contestants
- Released: 22 October 2010
- Recorded: 2010
- Genre: Cover
- Label: Sony Music

1. Linnea Henriksson - "Jumping Jack Flash"
2. **Jay Smith** - "Black Jesus"
3. Alice Hagenbrant - "Samson"
4. Geir Rönning - "Need You Now"
5. Elin Blom - "Nothing Else Matters"
6. Linda Varg - "Bubbly"
7. Andreas Weise - "Sunny"
8. Olle Hedberg - "The Scientist"
9. Minnah Karlsson - "Not Ready to Make Nice"
10. Sassa Bodensjö - "Weak"
11. Daniel Norberg - "Don't Look Back In Anger"

=== Det bästa från Idol 2010 ===
Det bästa från Idol 2010

Compilation album by Idol 2010 contestants
- Released: 19 November 2010
- Recorded: 2010
- Genre: Cover
- Label: Sony Music

1. Minnah Karlsson - "Piece of My Heart"
2. Olle Hedberg - "No Diggity"
3. Geir Rönning - "Ain't No Love in the Heart of the City"
4. Linnea Henriksson - "Hope There's Someone"
5. **Jay Smith** - "Heart-Shaped Box"
6. Alice Hagenbrant - "Breakaway"
7. Andreas Weise - "Ain't No Sunshine"
8. Elin Blom - "Hang With Me"
9. Daniel Norberg - "High and Dry"
10. Sassa Bodensjö - "Dude (Looks Like a Lady)"
11. Linda Varg - "Iris"
12. Idol Allstars 2010 - "All I Need Is You"
