= Idol 2009 (Sweden) =

- Season 2009
- Hosted by: Peter Jihde
- Judges: Laila Bagge; Andreas Carlsson; Anders Bagge
- Winner: Erik Grönwall
- Runner-up: Calle Kristiansson
- Finals venue: Ericsson Globe

Release
- Original network: TV4
- Original release: 8 September – 11 December 2009

Season chronology
- ← Previous; Season 2008 Next → Season 2010

Idol 2009 was the sixth season of the Swedish idol series and was broadcast by TV 4. The jury, identical to the previous year, consisted of Anders Bagge, Laila Bagge and Andreas Carlsson. Peter Jihde, the show's host, was also a continuation of the previous year's cast. The audition cities visited during the spring of 2009 were Gothenburg, Gävle, Malmö, Stockholm and Umeå, respectively. Around 11,000 people applied for Idol 2009, establishing a new Swedish record.

During auditions in Stockholm on 25 April, Idol 2008 winner Kevin Borg performed for the candidates, as well as Johan Palm who finished fourth in Idol 2008. In Gothenburg, Erik Segerstedt from Idol 2006 performed; and in Malmö, Sibel from Idol 2005. In Gävle, Idol 2008 runner-up Alice Svensson sang to the applicants; and in Umeå, Daniel Lindström from Idol 2004.

After the final of Idol 2008, the Idol producers said in a video on TV4's website that "Idol 2009 will be bigger than ever!" at the same time confirming that Idol would come back again during 2009. On 18 March TV4 published times and places for the year's audition tour. The programme started broadcasting on 8 September 2009.

After each show a program called "Idol: Eftersnack" was to be sent on TV400. As with the previous year, Katrin Zytomierska and Peter Jihde were the hosts.

On 15 October 2009, it was announced that the participant Erika Selin sang the demo for the song "Run", which would participate in Sweden's national selection "Melodifestivalen 2010" for Eurovision Song Contest 2010. A possible involvement in the festival, however, did not interfere with her participation in Idol.

In 2010, Clara was recruited to a newly started project with Jonas Berggren and Ulf Ekberg from Ace of Base. Clara was to share lead vocals with Julia Williamson. The first single from their album was released in September 2010.

== Changes/news ==
- Quarterfinals and semifinals of Idol 2009 were to be broadcast from Malmö and Gothenburg, while the grand finale was to be aired from Ericsson Globe in Stockholm.
- Anders Bagge was out on his own audition tour to find ten new talents, who didn't apply "the usual way" for Idol.
- The vignette that appeared in the beginning and end of each Idol episode and also before and after each advertising break was updated. Between 2005 and 2008, it was a rapper who told who sponsored the program.
- The two participants in the weekly finals which received the fewest votes were made to sing their songs again. Their previous votes were removed and a new round of voting decided who would leave.

== Judges ==
- Anders Bagge
- Laila Bagge
- Andreas Carlsson

== Hosts ==
- Peter Jihde – Host during Idol and Idol Eftersnack
- Katrin Zytomierska – Host during Idol Eftersnack

== Competitors ==
Below is a list of the nineteen jury-selected qualifiers. Before the qualifiers, the viewers got to decide whether Calle Kristiansson or Piotr Pawel Pospiech would move to the qualifying week. Viewers chose Calle Kristiansson as the 20th competitor. Those marked in bold are the ones which viewers chose to forward to the weekly finals. (The jury chose four of these, a total of 11 contestants.)

- Andréas Johansson, 19, Piteå
- **Calle Kristiansson, 21, Kristianstad**
- **Camilla Håkansson, 21, Kalix**
- Carl Chapal, 29, Gothenburg
- Clara Hagman, 18, Gävle
- **Eddie Razaz, 20, Stockholm**
- **Erik Grönwall, 21, Stockholm**
- **Erika Selin, 18, Dorotea**
- Jon Sindenius, 21, Västerås
- **Karolina Brånsgård, 25, Örebro**
- **Mariette Hansson, 26, Halmstad**
- Moa Carlebecker Forssell, 20, Växjö
- **Nicklas Hocker, 17, Onsala**
- Nicolle Walles, 17, Stockholm
- Patrik Öhlund, 37, Piteå
- **Rabih Jaber, 22, Lycksele**
- Rasmus Ingdahl, 21, Stockholm
- **Reza Ningtyas Lindh, 28, Lund**
- Sabina Täck, 19, Lessebo
- **Tove Östman Styrke, 16, Umeå**

== Semi-finals ==
20 participants remained for the final audition week in Stockholm. These were divided into four groups, two for men and two for women respectively. After the last episode of the week, 11 of the 20 remained and were chosen to compete for the title "Idol 2009". Those who are in bold are the ones viewers voted for the qualifying finals. The contestants are listed in the order they appeared during each night.

=== Semifinal 1 ===
Was aired on 28 September 2009.

1. **Calle Kristiansson, 21 years, Kristianstad – "Highway to Hell" (AC/DC)**
2. Nicklas Hocker, 17 years, Onsala – "Blood Is Thicker Than Water" (Black Label Society)
3. Andréas Johansson, 19 years, Piteå – "Hurtful" (Erik Hassle)
4. Eddie Razaz, 20 years, Stockholm – "Man in the Mirror" (Michael Jackson)
5. **Jon Sindenius, 21 years, Västerås – "Mama I'm Coming Home" (Ozzy Osbourne)**

=== Semifinal 2 ===
Was aired on 29 September 2009.

1. Sabina Täck, 19 years, Lessebo – "Ain't No Other Man" (Christina Aguilera)
2. Moa Carlebecker, 20 years, Växjö – "The Story" (Brandi Carlile)
3. Clara Hagman, 18 years, Gävle – "Release me" (Oh Laura)
4. **Mariette Hansson, 26 years, Halmstad – "Dear Mr President" (Pink)**
5. **Erika Selin, 18 years, Dorotea – "Bless the Broken Road" (Rascal Flatts)**

=== Semifinal 3 ===
Was aired on 30 September 2009.

1. Patrik Öhlund, 37 years, Piteå – With or Without You (U2)
2. Rasmus Ingdahl, 21 years, Stockholm – I'm Yours (Jason Mraz)
3. Carl Chapal, 29 years, Göteborg – Keep This Fire Burning (Robyn)
4. **Rabih Jaber, 22 years, Lycksele – With You (Chris Brown)**
5. **Erik Grönwall, 21 years, Stockholm – Is It True (Yohanna)**

=== Semifinal 4 ===
Was aired on 1 October 2009.

1. Nicolle Walles, 17 years, Stockholm – The Best (Tina Turner)
2. Reza Ningtyas Lindh, 28 years, Lund – Listen (Beyoncé)
3. Camilla Håkansson, 21 years, Kalix – My Heart Will Go On (Céline Dion)
4. **Karolina Brånsgård, 25 years, Örebro – It's a Man's World (James Brown)**
5. **Tove Östman Styrke, 16 years, Umeå – All These Things I've Done (The Killers)**

=== Qualifying finals ===
The qualifying finals aired on 2 October 2009. In the final qualifying program 12 people competed for 11 seats in the weekly finals. Viewers had chosen 8 contestants for the qualifying final and the judges chose 4 wildcards to participate in the qualifying finals. The person in bold was eliminated.

1. Erik Grönwall, 21 years, Stockholm – Beat It (Michael Jackson)
2. Reza Ningtyas Lindh, 28 years, Lund – Son of a Preacher Man (Dusty Springfield)
3. Erika Selin, 18 years, Dorotea – Show Me Heaven (Maria McKee)
4. Calle Kristiansson, 21 years, Kristianstad – Here I Go Again (Whitesnake)
5. Nicklas Hocker, 17 years, Onsala – Oh Pretty Woman (Gary Moore)
6. Tove Östman Styrke, 16 years, Umeå – Life on Mars (David Bowie)
7. **Jon Sindenius, 21 years, Västerås – Don't Look Back in Anger (Oasis)**
8. Eddie Razaz, 20 years, Stockholm – Hurtful (Erik Hassle)
9. Karolina Brånsgård, 25 years, Örebro – Fever (Peggy Lee, Little Willie John)
10. Rabih Jaber, 22 years, Lycksele – Stand by Me (Ben E. King)
11. Mariette Hansson, 26 years, Halmstad – Sweet Child o' Mine (Guns N' Roses)
12. Camilla Håkansson, 21 years, Kalix – Hallelujah (Leonard Cohen)

==== The judges wildcards to the qualifying finals ====
- Reza Ningtyas Lindh
- Nicklas Hocker
- Eddie Razaz
- Camilla Håkansson

== Finals ==
11 individuals competed for nine Fridays until the grand final in Globen, held on 11 December 2009. Artists marked with bold were excluded from the contest.

=== Week 1: Club Idol ===
The first final week was broadcast on 9 October 2009. The Idol 2004 participant Darin began the program by singing his cover of Coldplay's hit song "Viva La Vida" from 2008.

1. Nicklas Hocker – Get This Party Started (Pink)
2. Rabih Jaber – When Love Takes Over (David Guetta & Kelly Rowland)
3. Karolina Brånsgård – Just Dance (Lady Gaga)
4. Erika Selin – About You Now (Sugababes)
5. Calle Kristiansson – Destiny Calling (Melody Club)
6. Reza Ningtyas Lindh – Superstar (Jamelia)
7. Erik Grönwall – Leave a Light On (Belinda Carlisle)
8. Camilla Håkansson – All Night Long (Lionel Richie)
9. Eddie Razaz – Release Me (Agnes)
10. Mariette Hansson – When Tomorrow Comes (Eurythmics)
11. Tove Östman Styrke – Hot N Cold (Katy Perry)

==== Elimination ====
The two participants who received the fewest viewer votes had to sing a second time.
The person who is marked with a dark gray background had the lowest number of votes and was forced to leave Idol.

Lowest number of viewer votes
Karolina Brånsgård	Eddie Razaz

=== Week 2: Michael Jackson ===
The second final week was broadcast on 16 October 2009. The American Idol winner Jordin Sparks and Swedish Idol 2008 winner Kevin Borg began the program by together singing her and Chris Brown's song No Air from 2008. The participants also sang together We Are The World by Michael Jackson & Lionel Richie. At the end of the program (in the elimination round), Jordin Sparks sang her newest song S.O.S.

1. Calle Kristiansson – Bad (Michael Jackson)
2. Camilla Håkansson – Human Nature (Michael Jackson)
3. Reza Ningtyas Lindh – The Way You Make Me Feel (Michael Jackson)
4. Mariette Hansson – I Want You Back (The Jackson 5)
5. Eddie Razaz – They Don't Care About Us (Michael Jackson)
6. Tove Östman Styrke – Will You Be There (Michael Jackson)
7. Nicklas Hocker – Black or White (Michael Jackson)
8. Rabih Jaber – You Are Not Alone (Michael Jackson)
9. Erika Selin – Beat It (Michael Jackson)
10. Erik Grönwall – Thriller (Michael Jackson)

==== Elimination ====
The two participants who received the fewest viewer votes had to sing a second time.
The person who is marked with a dark gray background had the lowest number of votes and was forced to leave Idol.

Lowest number of viewer votes
Camilla Håkansson	Nicklas Hocker

=== Week 3: Rock ===
The third final week was broadcast on 23 October 2009. The season's first guest judge was Joey Tempest, from rock band Europe.

1. Erik Grönwall – Why Can't This Be Love (Van Halen)
2. Eddie Razaz – Beautiful Day (U2)
3. Erika Selin – Here Without You (3 Doors Down)
4. Mariette Hansson – I'm Just a Girl (No Doubt)
5. Rabih Jaber – Driving One of Your Cars (Lisa Miskovsky)
6. Tove Östman Styrke – We're Not Living in America (The Sounds)
7. Nicklas Hocker – Black Hole Sun (Soundgarden)
8. Reza Ningtyas Lindh – Don't Stop Me Now (Queen)
9. Calle Kristiansson – Are You Gonna Go My Way (Lenny Kravitz)

==== Elimination ====
The two participants who received the fewest viewer votes had to sing a second time.
The person who is marked with a dark gray background had the lowest number of votes and was forced to leave Idol.

Lowest number of viewer votes
Nicklas Hocker	Eddie Razaz

=== Week 4: Las Vegas ===
The fourth final week was broadcast on 30 October 2009. The contestants began the program singing Katy Perry's song Waking Up in Vegas with the jury member Andreas Carlsson; at the same time Laila Bagge was dancing with her dance partner Tobias Wallin from Let's Dance 2009.

1. Tove Östman Styrke – Mack the knife (Bobby Darin)
2. Calle Kristiansson – It's not unusual (Tom Jones)
3. Reza Ningtyas Lindh – New York City (Liza Minnelli)
4. Eddie Razaz – Can't take my eyes of off you (Frankie Valli & The Four Seasons)
5. Erika Selin – Sway (Perez Prado & Rosemary Clooney)
6. Erik Grönwall – "You Don't Have to Say You Love Me" (Dusty Springfield)
7. Mariette Hansson – You to Me Are Everything (The Real Thing)
8. Rabih Jaber – That's amore (Dean Martin)

==== Elimination ====
The two participants who received the fewest viewer votes had to sing a second time.
The person who is marked with a dark gray background had the lowest number of votes and was forced to leave Idol.

Lowest number of viewer votes
Erika Selin	Eddie Razaz

=== Week 5: Världens bästa låt ===
The fifth final week was broadcast on 6 November 2009.

1. Rabih Jaber – All my life (K-Ci & JoJo)
2. Mariette Hansson – Because the night (Bruce Springsteen)
3. Reza Ningtyas Lindh – Summertime (Fantasia Barrino)
4. Calle Kristiansson – With a little help from my friends (Joe Cocker)
5. Tove Östman Styrke – In the ghetto (Elvis Presley)
6. Eddie Razaz – If you're not the one (Daniel Bedingfield)
7. Erik Grönwall – The show must go on (Queen)

==== Elimination ====
The two participants who received the fewest viewer votes had to sing a second time.
The person who is marked with a dark gray background had the lowest number of votes and was forced to leave Idol.

Lowest number of viewer votes
Rabih Jaber	Mariette Hansson

=== Week 6: Topplistan ===
The sixth final week was broadcast on 13 November 2009. This week the jury member Anders Bagge was ill, therefore he was replaced by the Ace of Base-member Ulf Ekberg.

1. Erik Grönwall – Bodies (Robbie Williams)
2. Eddie Razaz – Curly Sue (Takida)
3. Reza Ningtyas Lindh – Halo (Beyoncé)
4. Calle Kristiansson – Bad Day (Daniel Powter)
5. Tove Östman Styrke – I Wish I was a Punkrocker (Sandi Thom)
6. Mariette Hansson – Bleeding Love (Leona Lewis)
1. Reza Ningtyas Lindh & Eddie Razaz – If only You (Danny Saucedo & Therese Grankvist)
2. Mariette Hansson & Calle Kristiansson – Someone New (Eskobar & Heather Nova)
3. Tove Östman Styrke & Erik Grönwall – Kids (Robbie Williams & Kylie Minogue)

==== Elimination ====
The two participants who received the fewest viewer votes had to sing a second time.
The person who is marked with a dark gray background had the lowest number of votes and was forced to leave Idol.

Lowest number of viewer votes
Eddie Razaz	Reza Ningtyas Lindh

=== Week 7: Kärlek ===
The seventh final week was broadcast on 20 November 2009. This was the last week Idol 2009 was to be broadcast from the Idol Studio in Stockholm.

Song 1, tribute to the fans:

1. Tove Östman Styrke – Sweet Dreams (Eurythmics)
2. Calle Kristiansson – To Be with You (Mr. Big)
3. Erik Grönwall – My Life Would Suck Without You (Kelly Clarkson)
4. Reza Ningtyas Lindh – You've Got a Friend (Carole King)
5. Mariette Hansson – Good Riddance (Time of Your Life) (Green Day)

Song 2, tribute to one or more relatives:

1. Tove Östman Styrke – Himlen är oskyldigt blå (Ted Gärdestad)
2. Calle Kristiansson – Your Song (Elton John)
3. Erik Grönwall – Always (Bon Jovi)
4. Reza Ningtyas Lindh – When I Need You (Leo Sayer, Céline Dion)
5. Mariette Hansson – Ängeln i rummet (Eva Dahlgren)

==== Elimination ====
The two participants who received the fewest viewer votes had to sing a second time.
The person who is marked with a dark gray background had the lowest number of votes and was forced to leave Idol.

Lowest number of viewer votes
Reza Ningtyas Lindh	Erik Grönwall

=== Week 8: Arena ===
The eighth final week was to be broadcast on 27 November 2009 from Malmö Arena in Malmö.

Song 1:

1. Calle Kristiansson – Hungry Heart (Bruce Springsteen)
2. Mariette Hansson – Land of Confusion (Genesis)
3. Tove Östman Styrke – Pride (U2)
4. Erik Grönwall – Shout It Out Loud (Kiss)

Song 2:

1. Calle Kristiansson – Jumpin' Jack Flash (The Rolling Stones)
2. Mariette Hansson – You're the Storm (The Cardigans)
3. Tove Östman Styrke – Since You Been Gone (Russ Ballard, Head East, Rainbow)
4. Erik Grönwall – Hey Jude (The Beatles)

==== Elimination ====
The two participants who received the fewest viewer votes had to sing a second time.
The person who is marked with a dark gray background had the lowest number of votes and was forced to leave Idol.

Lowest number of viewer votes
Mariette Hansson	Calle Kristiansson

=== Week 9: Jury's Choice ===
The ninth final week was to be broadcast on 4 December 2009 from Scandinavium in Gothenburg.

Song 1:

1. Calle Kristiansson – Walking in Memphis (Marc Cohn)
2. Erik Grönwall – Heaven (Bryan Adams)
3. Tove Östman Styrke – Can't Get You Out of My Head (Kylie Minogue)

Song 2:

1. Calle Kristiansson – Do Ya Think I'm Sexy (Rod Stewart)
2. Erik Grönwall – Run to the Hills (Iron Maiden)
3. Tove Östman Styrke – The Greatest Love of All (George Benson/Whitney Houston)

==== Elimination ====
The two participants who received the fewest viewer votes had to sing a second time.
The person who is marked with a dark gray background had the lowest number of votes and was forced to leave Idol.

Lowest number of viewer votes
Tove Östman Styrke	Erik Grönwall

=== Week 10: The final ===
The tenth and last final week was to be broadcast on 11 December 2009 from Ericsson Globe in Stockholm. Former "Idol" winner Agnes was to attend the final to perform.

Song 1:

1. Calle Kristiansson – Rock and roll (Led Zeppelin)
2. Erik Grönwall – The final countdown (Europe)

Song 2:

1. Calle Kristiansson – With a little help from my friends (Joe Cocker)
2. Erik Grönwall – The show must go on (Queen)

Song 3:

1. Calle Kristiansson – Higher (Calle Kristiansson)
2. Erik Grönwall – Higher (Erik Grönwall)

Lists below the participant who received the largest number of viewer votes and thus won Idol 2009.

The Winner
Erik Grönwall

== Elimination Chart ==
Legend
Did Not Perform	Female	Male	Top 24	Wild Card	Top 11	Winner

Safe	Save Last	Eliminated

Stage:		Quarter				Wild; Card	Semi	Finals									
Week:		09/28	09/29	09/30	10/1	10/2		10/9	10/16	10/23	10/30	11/6	11/13	11/20	11/27	12/4	12/11
Place	Contestant	Result															
1	Erik Grönwall			Top 12										Btm 2		Btm 2	Winner
2	Calle Kristiansson	Top 12													Btm 2		Runner-up
3	Tove Östman Styrke				Top 12											Elim	
4	Mariette Hansson		Top 12									Btm 2			Elim		
5	Reza Ningtyas Lindh				Elim	Top 12							Btm 2	Elim			
6	Eddie Razaz	Elim				Top 12		Btm 2		Btm 2	Btm 2		Elim				
7	Rabih Jaber			Top 12								Elim					
8	Erika Selin		Top 12								Elim						
9	Nicklas Hocker	Elim				Top 12			Btm 2	Elim							
10	Camilla Håkansson				Elim	Top 12			Elim								
11	Karolina Brånsgård				Top 12			Elim									
12	Jon Sidenius	Top 12					Elim										
Heat 4	Nicole Walles				Elim												
Heat 3	Carl Chapal			Elim													
Heat 3	Patrik Öhlund			Elim													
Heat 3	Rasmus Ingdahl			Elim													
Heat 2	Clara Hagman		Elim														
Heat 2	Moa Carlebecker		Elim														
Heat 2	Sabina Täcl		Elim														
Heat 1	Andreas Johansson	Elim															

== Idol 2009 album ==
Det bästa från Idol 2009 (The Best from Idol 2009) is a sampling Swedish Idol 2009 shows.
