= Dreaming People =

Single by Jay Smith
- Released: 2010
- Recorded: 2010
- Genre: Pop
- Songwriters: Christian Walz, Svante Halldin, Jakob Hazell and Sharon Vaughn

"Dreaming People" is an English language 2010 debut single by Jay Smith, winner of Swedish Idol 2010. He performed it as the winner song in the final of the competition. So did the other finalist Minnah Karlsson on 10 December 2010. The song is written by Christian Walz, Svante Halldin, Jakob Hazell and Sharon Vaughn. It was released as Smith's debut solo single shortly after the announcement of the Idol results. In its first week of release, it entered the Sverigetopplistan, the official Swedish Singles Chart, debuting at number 3 in week 51 (dated 24 December 2010).

== Charts ==
=== Weekly charts ===
Chart (2010)	Peak position
Sweden (Sverigetopplistan)	3

=== Year-end charts ===
Chart (2010)	Position
Sweden (Sverigetopplistan)	63

== Certifications ==
Region	Certification	Certified units/sales
Sweden (GLF)	Platinum	40,000^{‡}
^{‡} Sales+streaming figures based on certification alone.
