= Arne Weise =

Swedish television personality (1930–2019)

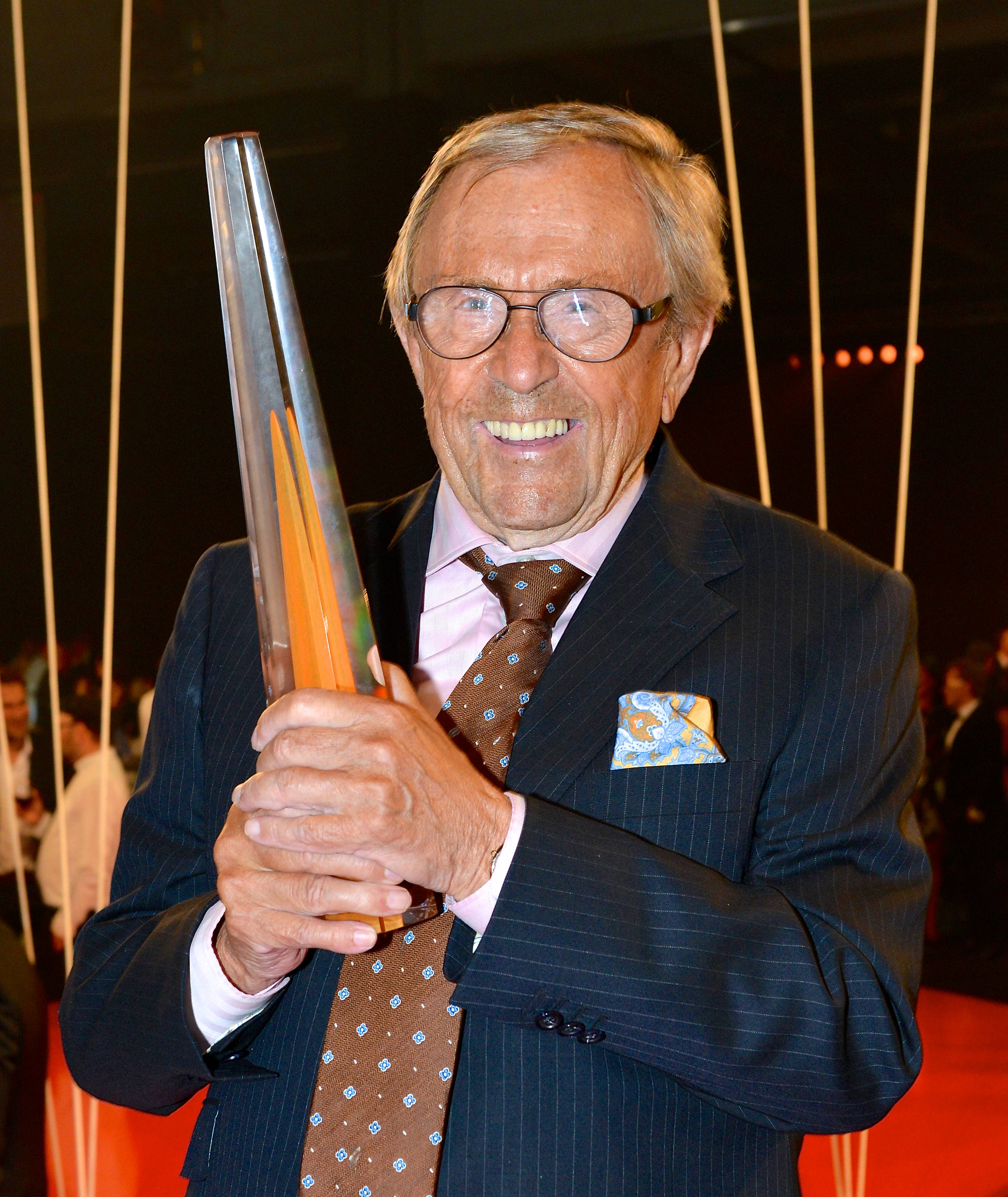
- Arne Weise after winning a Kristallen-award in 2013
- Born: Arne Georg Fredrik Weise; 28 February 1930; Malmö, Sweden
- Died: 25 September 2019 (aged 89); Stockholm, Sweden
- Occupation: Television presenter
- Known for: Numerous programmes

Arne Georg Fredrik Weise (28 February 1930 – 25 September 2019) was a Swedish journalist and television personality, one of the presenters for Sveriges Television (SVT). He worked at Sveriges Radio from 1952 and started working for SVT in 1979.

== Early life ==
Born in Malmö, Arne Georg Fredrik Weise was the son of engineer Per Weise (1897–1991) and Ingrid Tengström (1893–1987). He grew up in Malmö and Gothenburg and did his high school education at Hvitfeldtska gymnasiet, passing his studentexamen in 1950. He later studied at Uppsala University and then the University of Gothenburg between 1951 and 1953, and resided in Italy between 1954 and 1956.

== Career ==
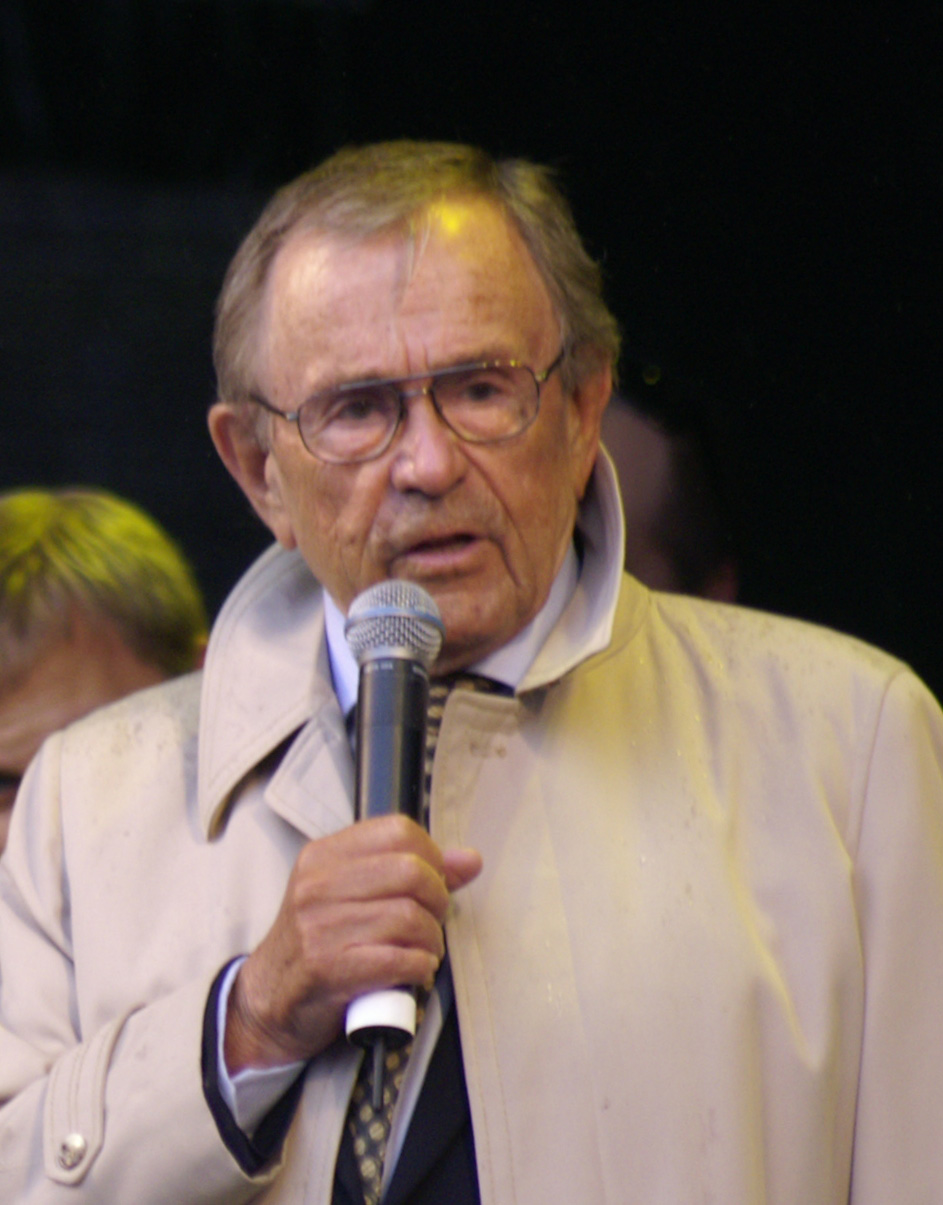
Weise in 2006

During four decades, 1972–2002, with interruptions in 1978–1979 and 1988–1990, Weise was the presenter of the SVT Christmas Eve broadcast throughout the day. When he became 65 years old in 1995, Weise announced that he was about to quit his job as presenter on Christmas Eve, the announcement was met with large protests. The protests led to additional seven years as presenter for Weise. He also presented the nature show Ett med naturen and Minnenas television in SVT.

In 2002, Weise released the music album Minnen, drömmar och lite till, containing thirteen songs he wrote himself. He also presented the music show Svensktoppen at Sveriges Radio. In 1982, Weise acted in the TV-series Skulden which was broadcast on SVT, there he acted against Gösta Ekman.

Arne Weise also worked as a moderator, speaker, and conferencier. In August 2010, Weise voiced a character in the film Sveket mot minkarna, which revealed the hard conditions of minks in minkfarms in Sweden. Liseberg has also used Weise's voice for radio commercials and TV-commercials for Christmas at Liseberg.

In 2013, Weise won a Kristallen award in the honor category for his work in television.

== Personal life ==
Weise was married and divorced three times and had five children. From his first marriage he had Mikael (born 1959), Madeleine (born 1962), and Marie-Louise (born 1963). From his third marriage he has a son Andreas Weise (born 1986), a singer who participated in Idol 2010 where he placed fifth; a daughter Anna (born 1988) also was born from the same marriage.

In 2007, while televising the opening of a wolf enclosure at Kolmården Wildlife Park, Weise was attacked by a wolf, but survived the attack.

On 25 September 2019, Weise died of natural causes at the age of 89.

== Discography ==
- 2002: "Minnen, drömmar och lite till"
- 2004: "Don't Fall Down On Me"

== Bibliography ==
- 1965 – Detta med ungdom: skisser. Stockholm: Gummesson. Libris 713320
- 1992 – Det bästa ur Ett med naturen. Stockholm: Sveriges radio. Libris 7409661. ISBN 9152217280
- 1995 – I blickpunkten. Stockholm: Forum. Libris 7256434. ISBN 9137107402
- 2011 – Boberg, Lars; Weise Arne. Våra 100 år med radio och TV. Västerås: Ica. Libris 12134956. ISBN 978-91-534-3638-6
