= Erika Selin =

Swedish singer (born 1991)

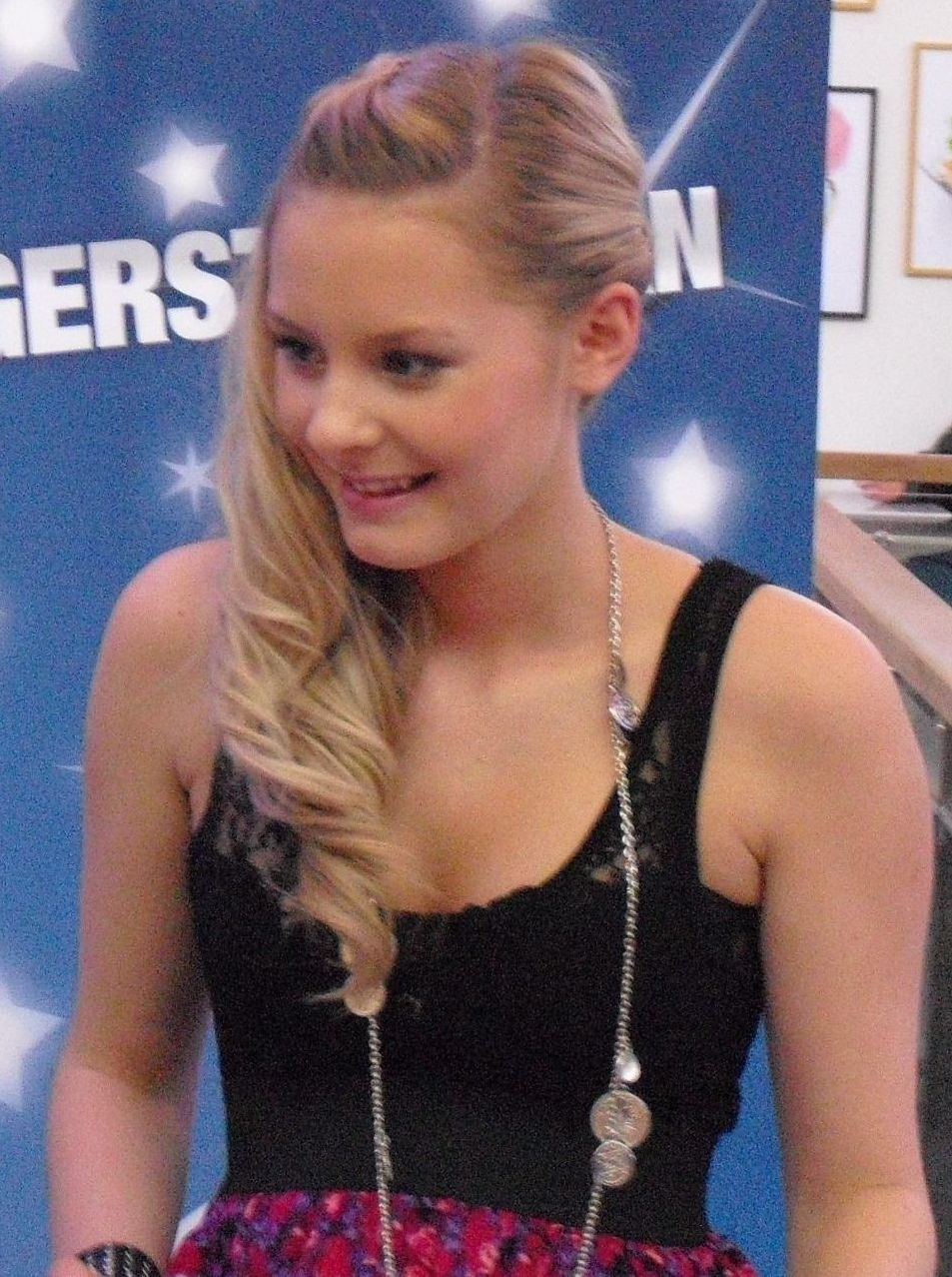
- Erika Selin in 2009

Background information
- Born: Erika Selin; August 6, 1991 (age 34)
- Origin: Dorotea, Sweden
- Genres: Pop
- Occupation: Singer
- Instrument: Vocals
- Years active: 2009–

Erika Selin (born August 6, 1991) is a Swedish singer, who competed in Idol 2009 where she finished in eighth place. In 2015, she took part in Eurosong for selecting the Irish entry for Eurovision Song Contest 2015 with "Break Me Up" finishing third.

== Idol 2009 ==
In 2009, Erika Selin took part in season 6 of the Swedish version of Idol where she auditioned with "A Moment Like This", a song by Kelly Clarkson becoming part of the Top 20 picked for the live shows. On the second semi-final night aired on 29 September 2009, she sang "Bless the Broken Road" from the Rascal Flattss and was one of two semi-finalists that night to go through to next round singing "Show Me Heaven" from Maria McKee. This qualified her to the Top 11.

Further performances in the finals:

- Week 1 (9 October 2009) – Theme: Club Idol – "About You Now" (Sugababes) (qualified to Top 10)
- Week 2 (16 October 2009) – Theme: Michael Jackson songs – "Beat It" (Michael Jackson) (qualified to Top 9)
- Week 3 (23 October 2009) – Theme: Rock songs – "Here Without You" (3 Doors Down) (qualified to Top 8)
- Week 4 (30 October 2009) – Theme: Las Vegas – "Sway" (Perez Prado & Rosemary Clooney) (Eliminated finishing 8th overall for season)

== After Idol ==
Selin sent in the entry "Kom" to Melodifestivalen 2010 but in the end the song was given to girl band Timoteij for the contest.

In 2010, she also released the music single "For You" along with singer Patrik Öhlund.

== Eurosong 2015 for Ireland ==
Selin participated in the national selection that selected the act to represent Ireland in the Eurovision Song Contest 2015 with the song "Break Me Up". The song was picked as one of the Top 5 for the live show final held on 27 February 2015 on The Late Late Show, where she performed live with Cecilia Kallin from Timoteij and her brother Charles Kallin performing as back-up singers and guitarists. She placed third overall in the selection process, with "Playing with Numbers" by Molly Sterling winning to represent Ireland. The "Break Me Up" music video was produced by photographer Martin Botvidsson.

== Discography ==
=== Album ===
featured in

- 2009: Det bästa från Idol 2009

=== Singles ===
- 2009: "About You Now"
- 2009: "I Wish Everyday Could Be Like Christmas" (with Idol Allstars 2009)
- 2010: "For You"
- 2015: "Break Me Up" (Entry in Eurosong 2015, Irish Eurovision selections)
