= Katrin Zytomierska =

Swedish blogger

- Born: Katrin-Julie Zytomierska; 17 September 1977 (age 47); Råsunda, Sweden
- Other names: Katrin Schulman
- Occupation(s): Blogger, television host, columnist, business woman
- Spouse: Alex Schulman (m. 2007; div. 2008)
- Partner(s): Bingo Rimér (2009–2015); Alexander Klingstedt (2015–2018)
- Children: 3

Katrin Zytomierska (born 17 September 1977) is a Swedish blogger, columnist, television host, and businesswoman. She was born to a Polish-Catholic mother and a Polish-Jewish father. She is the founder and president of KZ Clean Eating and the public relations company Pure PR. .

In late 2008, she hosted (together with Peter Jihde) the TV400 program Idol: Eftersnack, a weekly sister program to Idol 2008 that featured interviews with the contestants and the jury. Zytomierska was heavily criticized in the Swedish media for making negative comments towards the contestants, such as calling one of them "too gay" and another one "gross" for performing barefoot. It was speculated that she would be forced to leave the program before the season ended; however, after an emergency meeting between TV4 and TV400, it was decided that she would be given a second chance.

In 2008, she also hosted the program Sunday Supreme on MTV Sweden, and appeared in the television show Du är vad du äter (the Swedish version of You Are What You Eat) to cure her unhealthy drinking habits. Zytomierska hosted Idol: Eftersnack once again in 2009, but was replaced in 2010. During 2009 and 2010, she appeared frequently on the morning radio show VAKNA! med The Voice (which airs on The Voice, but is also televised on Kanal 5). Her controversial attacks on Swedish celebrities on the show made headlines in the Swedish media.

In September 2010, just before the 2010 Swedish general election, the news site Résumé reported that Zytomierska was being paid to promote the Moderate Party on her blog.

She was married to Alex Schulman, who also worked with Pure PR, for one year until they separated in 2008. During her marriage with Schulman, her name was Katrin Schulman. Zytomierska was in a relationship with photographer Bingo Rimér from 2009 to 2015, and they had two sons together, one born in 2010 and the second in 2013. She gave birth to her third son in 2017, with Alexander Klingstedt, who was her partner from 2015 to 2018.
