= Idol 2008 (Sweden) =

- Season 2008
- Hosted by: Peter Jihde
- Judges: Laila Bagge; Andreas Carlsson; Anders Bagge
- Winner: Kevin Borg
- Runner-up: Alice Svensson
- Finals venue: Globen

Release
- Original network: TV4
- Original release: 3 September – 12 December 2008

Season chronology
- ← Previous; Season 2007 Next → Season 2009

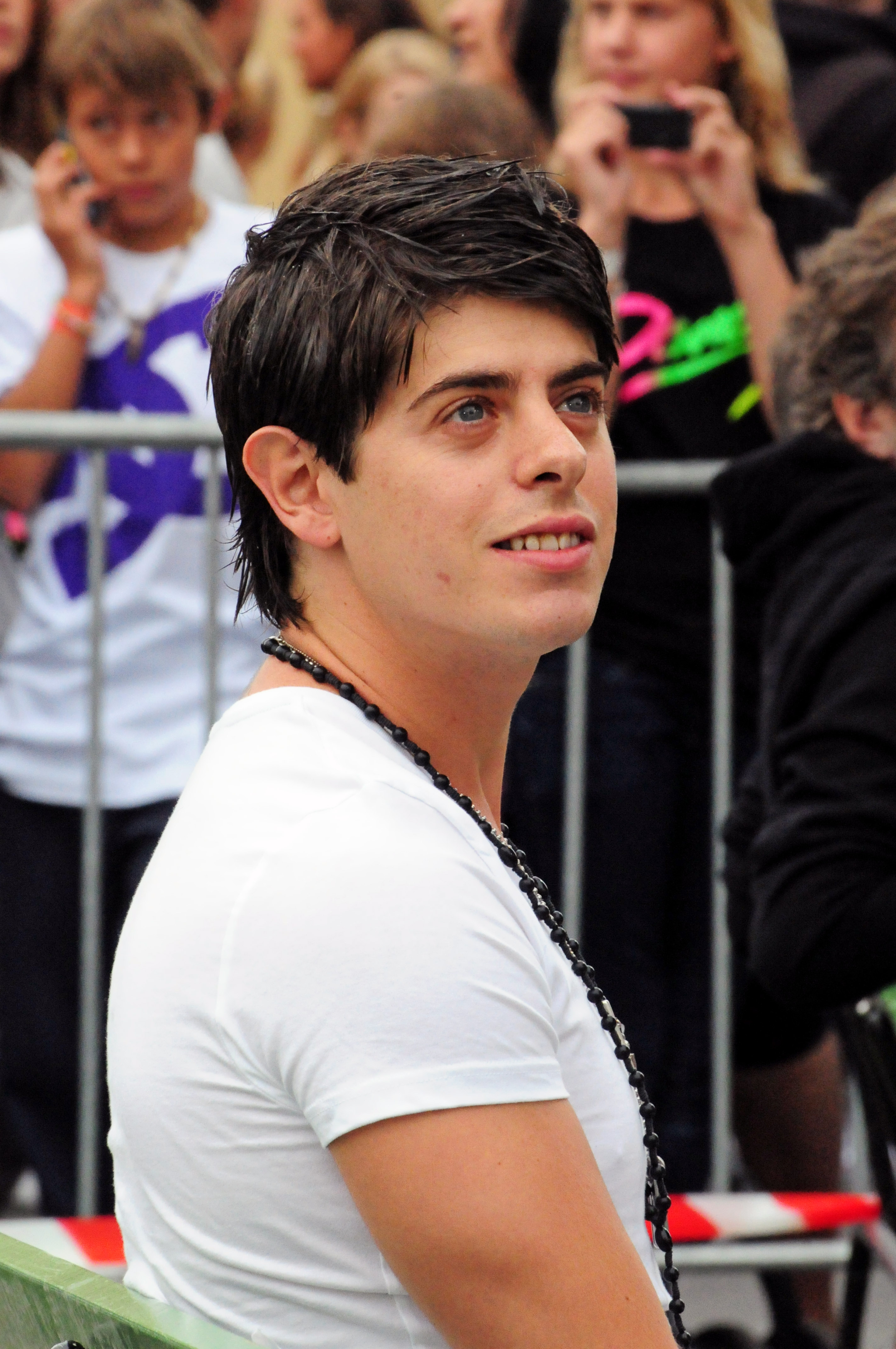
Kevin Borg

The fifth season of Swedish Idol premiered on 3 September 2008 and continued until its grand finale on 12 December, when 22-year-old Kevin Borg was crowned winner. It was the first season to feature new judges Laila Bagge, Anders Bagge and Andreas Carlsson, a move that made it the first Idol series in the world to completely replace its judging panel. The series took advantage of guest judges including Charlotte Perrelli, Desmond Child and Cyndi Lauper, and the final 3 results show featured a performance by Leona Lewis, who sang "Forgive Me". For the second year running, the grand finale was held in Stockholm's Globen Arena with a live audience of 16,000 people, where operatic group Il Divo also sang live. Season 5 of Swedish Idol marked only the second time in worldwide Idol history where neither of the final two contestants were born in the show's home country. Winner Kevin Borg was born in Malta and runner-up Alice Svensson was born in Vietnam. The only other Idol contest to have this occur was Greece's Super Idol in 2004.

== Judges ==
- Laila Bagge - Sony BMG manager
- Anders Bagge - Record producer
- Andreas Carlsson - Songwriter

== Hosts ==
- Peter Jihde - Host during Idol and Idol Eftersnack
- Katrin Zytomierska - Host during Idol Eftersnack

== Auditions ==
Auditions were held in the Swedish cities of Gothenburg, Luleå, Karlstad, Lund and Stockholm during the spring of 2008.

== Finals ==
=== Finalists ===
(ages stated at time of contest)

Contestant	Age	Hometown	Voted Off	Liveshow Theme
Kevin Borg	22	Arvidsjaur	Winner	Grand Finale
Alice Svensson	17	Hedesunda	12 December 2008	Grand Finale
Robin Bengtsson	18	Svenljunga	5 December 2008	Judges' Choice
Johan Palm	16	Mjölby	28 November 2008	Gospel Hits
Anna Bergendahl	16	Nyköping	21 November 2008	Love Songs
Robin Ericsson	21	Stockholm	14 November 2008	Soul & Duets
Lars Eriksson	28	Lund	7 November 2008	Rock Hits
Sepideh Vaziri	24	Stockholm	31 October 2008	Swedish Hits
Loulou Lamotte	27	Burträsk	24 October 2008	Hits by ABBA
Yazmina Simic	16	Växjö	17 October 2008	The 90s
Jesper Blomberg	22	Floda	10 October 2008	Idol's 5-Year Celebration

=== Live Show Details ===
==== Heat 1 - Top 8 Girls (29 September 2008) ====
Order	Artist	Song (original artists)	Result
1	Victoria Dogan	"Secret Love" (JoJo)	Eliminated
2	Loulou Lamotte	"I Wanna Dance with Somebody" (Whitney Houston)	Safe
3	Alice Svensson	"Beautiful Disaster" (Kelly Clarkson)	Safe
4	Jenny Karevik	"Licence to Kill" (Gladys Knight)	Bottom two
5	Sepideh Vaziri	"I Will Survive" (Gloria Gaynor)	Safe
6	Yazmina Simic	"What a Wonderful World" (Eva Cassidy)	Safe
7	Anna Bergendahl	"Time After Time" (Eva Cassidy)	Safe
8	Linda Pritchard	"All the Man That I Need" (Whitney Houston)	Safe

==== Heat 2 - Top 8 Boys (30 September 2008) ====
Order	Artist	Song (original artists)	Result
1	Jesper Blomberg	"Everything" (Michael Bublé)	Bottom two
2	Elias Ringquist	"No Diggity" (Blackstreet)	Safe
3	Kevin Borg	"How Am I Supposed to Live Without You" (Michael Bolton)	Safe
4	Rasmus Ingdahl	"Someone Should Tell You" (Lemar)	Eliminated
5	Robin Bengtsson	"Bridge Over Troubled Water" (Simon & Garfunkel)	Safe
6	Johan Palm	"When You Were Young" (The Killers)	Safe
7	Lars Eriksson	"Everybody Hurts" (R.E.M.)	Safe
8	Robin Ericsson	"Maybe Tomorrow" (Stereophonics)	Safe

==== Heat 3 - Top 7 Girls (1 October 2008) ====
Order	Artist	Song (original artists)	Result
1	Linda Pritchard	"Stop" (Sam Brown)	Eliminated
2	Anna Bergendahl	"Love You I Do" (Jennifer Hudson)	Safe
3	Yazmina Simic	"Heaven" (Bryan Adams)	Safe
4	Jenny Karevik	"Be the Man" (Celine Dion)	Safe
5	Alice Svensson	"Fighter" (Christina Aguilera)	Safe
6	Sepideh Vaziri	"One Night Only" (Jennifer Hudson)	Bottom two
7	Loulou Lamotte	"Until You Come Back to Me (That's What I'm Gonna Do)" (Aretha Franklin)	Safe

==== Heat 4 - Top 7 Boys (2 October 2008) ====
Order	Artist	Song (original artists)	Result
1	Elias Ringquist	"Ordinary People" (John Legend)	Eliminated
2	Robin Bengtsson	"Chariot" (Gavin DeGraw)	Safe
3	Lars Ericsson	"Politik" (Coldplay)	Safe
4	Jesper Blomberg	"Hallelujah I Love Her So" (Ray Charles)	Safe
5	Robin Eriksson	"I Surrender" (Rainbow)	Bottom two
6	Kevin Borg	"Footloose" (Kenny Loggins)	Safe
7	Johan Palm	"You Don't Know What Love Is (You Just Do as You're Told)" (The White Stripes)	Safe

==== Heat 5 - Top 12 (3 October 2008) ====
Order	Artist	Song (original artists)	Result
1	Johan Palm	"When You Were Young" (The Killers)	Advanced
2	Jenny Karevik	"Licence to Kill" (Gladys Knight)	Eliminated
3	Jesper Blomberg	"Everything" (Michael Bublé)	Advanced
4	Alice Svensson	"Beautiful Disaster" (Kelly Clarkson)	Advanced
5	Robin Bengtsson	"Chariot" (Gavin DeGraw)	Advanced
6	Anna Bergendahl	"Love You I Do" (Jennifer Hudson)	Advanced
7	Robin Eriksson	"I Surrender" (Rainbow)	Advanced
8	Loulou Lamotte	"Until You Come Back to Me (That's What I'm Gonna Do)" (Aretha Franklin)	Advanced
9	Kevin Borg	"How Am I Supposed to Live Without You" (Michael Bolton)	Advanced
10	Sepideh Vaziri	"I Will Survive" (Gloria Gaynor)	Advanced
11	Lars Ericsson	"Politik" (Coldplay)	Advanced
12	Yazmina Simic	"Heaven" (Bryan Adams)	Advanced

==== Live Show 1 (10 October 2008) ====
Theme: Idol's 5 Year Celebration

Order	Artist	Song (original artists)	Result
1	Kevin Borg	"Natalie" (Ola Svensson)	Safe
2	Loulou Lamotte	"Hurt" (Christina Aguilera)	Safe
3	Robin Bengtsson	"Mercy" (Duffy)	Safe
4	Yazmina Simic	"Don't Stop the Music" (Rihanna)	Bottom two
5	Lars Eriksson	"You're Beautiful" (James Blunt)	Safe
6	Alice Svensson	"These Words" (Natasha Bedingfield)	Safe
7	Jesper Blomberg	"So Sick" (Ne-Yo)	Eliminated
8	Sepideh Vaziri	"I Kissed a Girl" (Katy Perry)	Bottom three
9	Johan Palm	"Viva la Vida" (Coldplay)	Safe
10	Anna Bergendahl	"Release Me" (Oh Laura)	Safe
11	Robin Ericsson	"It's My Life" (No Doubt)	Safe

==== Live Show 2 (17 October 2008) ====
Theme: 90s Hits

Order	Artist	Song (original artists)	Result
1	Robin Ericsson	"Angels" (Robbie Williams)	Safe
2	Yazmina Simic	"Born to Make You Happy" (Britney Spears)	Eliminated
3	Anna Bergendahl	"Nothing Compares 2 U" (Sinéad O'Connor)	Safe
4	Robin Bengtsson	"Torn" (Natalie Imbruglia)	Bottom two
5	Johan Palm	"Beautiful Ones" (Suede)	Safe
6	Lars Eriksson	"One" (U2)	Safe
7	Sepideh Vaziri	"(Everything I Do) I Do It for You" (Bryan Adams)	Safe
8	Loulou Lamotte	"Stars" (Simply Red)	Safe
9	Kevin Borg	"All I Wanna Do Is Make Love To You" (Heart)	Safe
10	Alice Svensson	"Ironic" (Alanis Morissette)	Safe

==== Live Show 3 (24 October 2008) ====
Theme: Songs by ABBA

Order	Artist	Song (original artists)	Result
1	Loulou Lamotte	"SOS"	Eliminated
2	Lars Eriksson	"Money Money Money"	Safe
3	Alice Svensson	"Lay All Your Love on Me"	Safe
4	Robin Ericsson	"Waterloo"	Safe
5	Anna Bergendahl	"Mamma Mia"	Bottom three
6	Kevin Borg	"Gimme! Gimme! Gimme! (A Man After Midnight)"	Safe
7	Robin Bengtsson	"Does Your Mother Know"	Safe
8	Johan Palm	"The Winner Takes It All"	Safe
9	Sepideh Vaziri	"Dancing Queen"	Bottom two

==== Live Show 4 (24 October 2008) ====
Theme: Swedish Songs
Guest Judge: Charlotte Perrelli

Order	Artist	Song (original artists)	Result
1	Robin Bengtsson	"När vindarna viskar mitt namn" (Roger Pontare)	Bottom two
2	Sepideh Vaziri	"Främling" (Carola Häggkvist)	Eliminated
3	Kevin Borg	"Lyssna till ditt hjärta" (Friends)	Safe
4	Alice Svensson	"Min kärlek" (Shirley Clamp)	Bottom three
5	Johan Palm	"Johnny the Rucker" (Magnus Uggla)	Safe
6	Robin Ericsson	"Michelangelo" (Björn Skifs)	Safe
7	Anna Bergendahl	"Stad i ljus" (Tommy Körberg)	Safe
8	Lars Eriksson	"Det börjar verka kärlek banne mig" (Claes-Göran Hederström)	Safe

== Elimination chart ==
Stages:		Semi-Finals					Finals									
Weeks:		29 Sep	30 Sep	1 Oct	2 Oct	3 Oct	10 Oct	17 Oct	24 Oct	31 Oct	7 Nov	14 Nov	21 Nov	28 Nov	5 Dec	12 Dec
Place	Contestant	Result														
1	Kevin Borg															Winner
2	Alice Svensson									Btm 3				Btm 2		Runner-up
3	Robin Bengtsson							Btm 2		Btm 2		Btm 2	Btm 3		Elim	
4	Johan Palm										Btm 3	Btm 3	Btm 2	Elim		
5	Anna Bergendahl								Btm 3				Elim			
6	Robin Ericsson				Btm 2						Btm 2	Elim				
7	Lars Eriksson										Elim					
8	Sepideh Vaziri			Btm 2			Btm 3		Btm 2	Elim						
9	Loulou Lamotte								Elim							
10	Yazmina Simic						Btm 2	Elim								
11	Jesper Blomberg		Btm 2				Elim									
12	Jenny Karevik	Btm 2				Elim										
Semi	Elias Ringquist				Elim											
Semi	Linda Pritchard			Elim												
Semi	Rasmus Ingdahl		Elim													
Semi	Victoria Dogan	Elim														

Legend
Women	Men	Top 11	Top 16	Eliminated	Safe	not performed

== Finalist Song Choices ==
=== Rock ===
Guest judge: Desmond Child

1. Johan Palm - Poison (Alice Cooper)
2. Lars Eriksson - Smells Like Teen Spirit (Nirvana)
3. Anna Bergendahl - Save Up All Your Tears (Cher)
4. Robin Ericsson - You Give Love a Bad Name (Bon Jovi)
5. Robin Bengtsson - Dude Looks Like a Lady (Aerosmith)
6. Alice Svensson - Heaven's on Fire (Kiss)
7. Kevin Borg - Livin' on a Prayer (Bon Jovi)

=== Soul & Duets ===
Soul

1. Kevin Borg - Signed, Sealed, Delivered I'm Yours (Stevie Wonder)
2. Robin Ericsson - Reach Out I'll Be There (Four Tops)
3. Robin Bengtsson - (Sittin' On) The Dock of the Bay (Otis Redding)
4. Johan Palm - You Can't Hurry Love (The Supremes)
5. Alice Svensson - I Say a Little Prayer (Dionne Warwick)
6. Anna Bergendahl - Bleeding Love (Leona Lewis)

Duets

1. Johan Palm & Robin Ericsson - We Built This City (Starship)
2. Kevin Borg & Anna Bergendahl - (I've Had) The Time of My Life (Bill Medley & Jennifer Warnes)
3. Robin Bengtsson & Alice Svensson - You're the One That I Want (John Travolta & Olivia Newton-John)

=== Love ===
1. Robin Bengtsson - Let Me Entertain You (Robbie Williams) & Fields of Gold (Sting)
2. Kevin Borg - If Tomorrow Never Comes (Ronan Keating) & In the Shadows (The Rasmus)
3. Anna Bergendahl - Simply the Best (Tina Turner) & Over the Rainbow (Eva Cassidy)
4. Johan Palm - I'll Stand By You (The Pretenders) & Friday I'm in Love (The Cure)
5. Alice Svensson - Because of You (Kelly Clarkson) & Crazy In Love (Beyoncé)

=== Gospel ===
Guest judge: Carola Häggkvist

1. Johan Palm - Long Train Runnin' (Doobie Brothers) & Free Fallin' (Tom Petty)
2. Alice Svensson - Shackles (Mary Mary) & Independent Women (Destiny's Child)
3. Kevin Borg - Higher and Higher (Jackie Wilson) & The Way You Make Me Feel (Michael Jackson)
4. Robin Bengtsson - Joyful, Joyful (Lauryn Hill) & My Love Is Your Love (Whitney Houston)

=== Jury's choice ===
1. Alice Svensson - Keep This Fire Burning (Robyn) & Girlfriend (Avril Lavigne)
2. Robin Bengtsson - It's My Life (Bon Jovi) & Black or White (Michael Jackson)
3. Kevin Borg - Livin' la Vida Loca (Ricky Martin) & Hot In Herre (Nelly)

== Idol 2008 album ==
Det bästa från Idol 2008 (The Best from Idol 2008) is a sampling Swedish Idol 2008 shows.
