= Sibel =

- Pronunciation: [ˈsiːbel]
- Gender: Female

Origin
- Origin: Turkish
- Meaning: Prophetess, Oracle

Other names
- Related names: Sibyl

Sibel is a female Turkish given name that is the Turkish spelling of the Anatolian mother goddess, Cybele, symbol and protector of abundance.

== People ==
=== Given name ===
- Sibel Adalı, Turkish-American computer scientist
- Sibel Altınkaya (born 1993), Turkish table tennis player
- Sibel Arslan (born 1980), Swiss-Turkish politician and lawyer
- Sibel Alaş (born 1973), Turkish pop singer
- Sibel Can (born 1970), Turkish folk singer
- Sibel Çam (born 1990), Turkish Paralympian powerlifter
- Sibel Duman (born 1990), Turkish footballer
- Sibel Egemen (born 1958), Turkish singer
- Sibel Edmonds (born 1970), founder of NSWBC
- Sibel Galindez (born 1967), American actress
- Sibel Güler (born 1984), Bulgarian-born Turkish taekwondo practitioner
- Sibel Karameke (born 1995), Turkish handball and beach handball o-player
- Sibel Kekilli (born 1980), German actress of Turkish descent
- Sibel Kızavul (born 1993), Turkish volleyball player
- Sibel Kolçak (born 1990), Turkish football referee
- Sibel Özkan (born 1988), Turkish weightlifter
- Sibel Redzep (born 1987), Macedonian-born Turkish-Swedish singer
- Sibel Siber (born 1960), Turkish Cypriot politician
- Sibel Şimşek (born 1984), Turkish weightlifter
- Esra Sibel Tezkan (born 1993), Turkish-German women's footballer
- Sibel Tüzün (born 1971), Turkish rock singer
- Zeynep Sibel Algan (born 1955), Turkish diplomat

== See also ==
- Sibel (film), a 2018 Turkish film
