= Running with Lions =

Single by Alice Svensson
- Released: 25 February 2017
- Recorded: 2016
- Genre: Pop
- Length: 3:00
- Label: Giant Records
- Songwriter(s): Anderz Wrethov; Andreas "Stone" Johansson; Denniz Jamm; Alice Svensson

Alice Svensson singles chronology
"I Wanna Live" (2010)	"Running with Lions" (2017)

"Running with Lions" is a song recorded by Swedish singer Alice Svensson. The song was released as a digital download in Sweden on 25 February 2017 and peaked at number 87 on the Swedish Singles Chart. It took part in Melodifestivalen 2017, and placed fifth in the fourth semi-final on 25 February 2017. It was written by Anderz Wrethov, Andreas "Stone" Johansson, Denniz Jamm, and Svensson.

== Track listing ==
Digital download
No.	Title	Length
1.	"Running with Lions"	3:00

== Chart performance ==
Chart (2017)	Peak position
Sweden (Sverigetopplistan)	81

== Release history ==
Region	Date	Format	Label
Sweden	25 February 2017	Digital download	Giant Records
