= Minnah Karlsson (album) =

2010 cover album by Minnah Karlsson

Minnah Karlsson is a cover album by Minnah Karlsson, Sweden. On the album are songs that she has made during the Swedish Idol 2010. The album was released on 19 December 2010 for digital download and 20 December 2010 in stores. Adam Lambert celebrated Minnah for her cover of his song Whataya Want From Me who is featured on the album.

== Track listing (All songs covers) ==
1. Whataya Want From Me (Adam Lambert)
2. Twist And Shout (The Beatles)
3. Just the Way You Are (Bruno Mars)
4. Always On My Mind (Elvis Presley)
5. Calleth You, Cometh I (The Ark (Swedish band))
6. Total Eclipse of the Heart (Bonnie Tyler)
7. When Love Takes Over (David Guetta and Kelly Rowland)
8. (Everything I Do) I Do It for You (Bryan Adams)
9. Alone(Heart)
10. Piece Of My Heart (Beverley Knight)
11. Not Ready to Make Nice (Dixie Chicks)
