= Calle Kristiansson =

Swedish singer (born 1988)

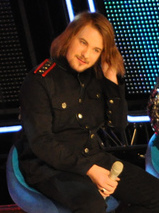
- Kristiansson in 2009

Background information
- Born: Calle Kristiansson; 5 July 1988 (age 37)
- Origin: Kristianstad, Sweden
- Genres: Rock
- Occupation: Singer
- Instruments: Vocals, guitar
- Years active: 2009–present
- Labels: Sony Music
- Website: www.callekristiansson.com

Calle Kristiansson (born 5 July 1988 in Kristianstad) is a Swedish singer, who came first runner-up in Idol 2009 after the winner Erik Grönwall.

== Music ==
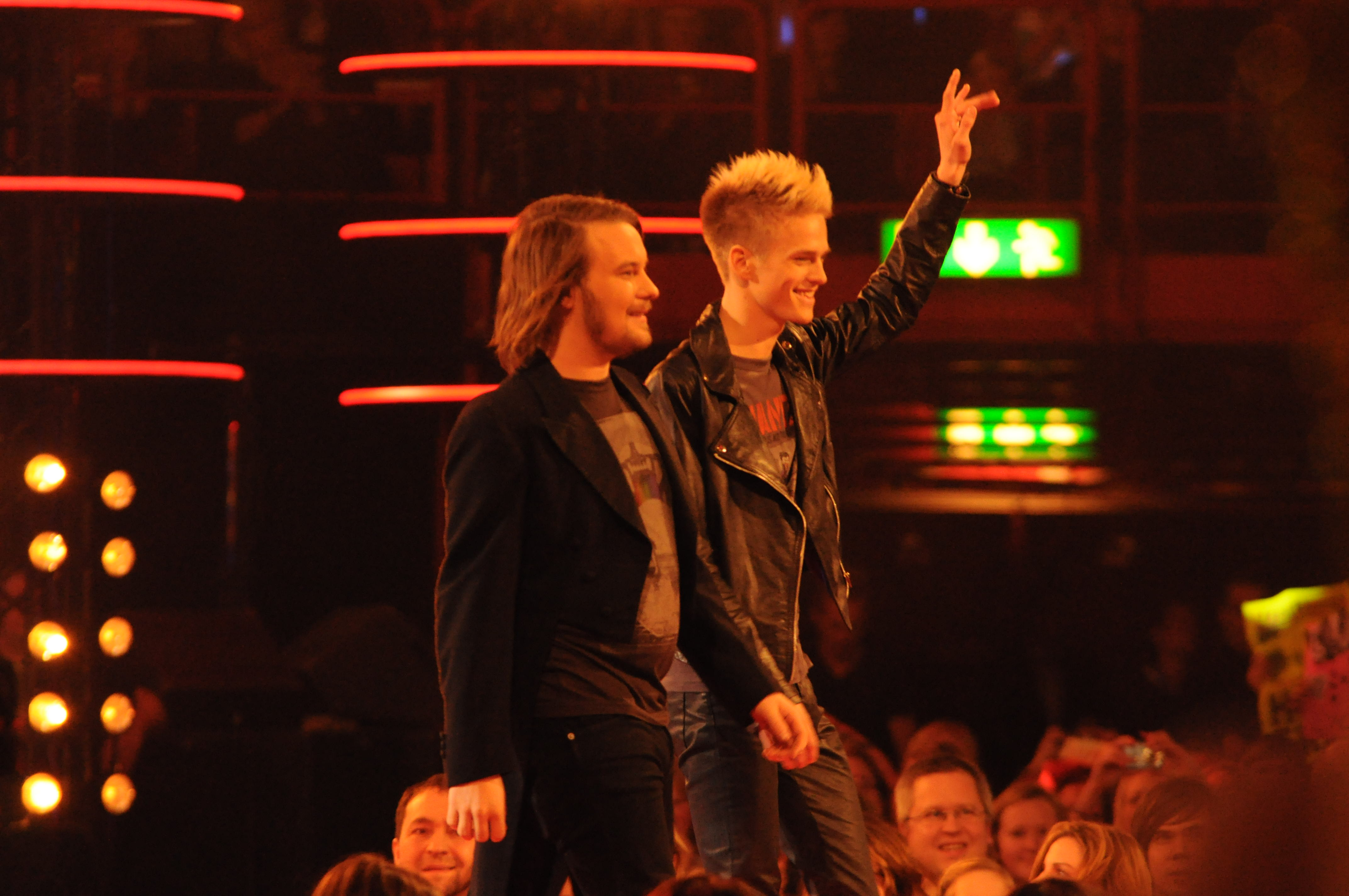
Kristiansson (left) with Swedish Idol runner-up Erik Grönwall (right) in 2009

One of the songs he performed in the Idol 2009 competition, Marc Cohn's "Walking in Memphis", was featured on the 12-track "Best of Idol 2009" compilation CD, and three other 2010 compilations. On 23 December 2009 Kristiansson released his first studio album, containing 11 songs from his performances on Idol.

He toured during 2010 with his band Calle & The Undervalleys. In 2011 they were credited by event organizers in one news report with "saving the festival" in the town of Hörby, when the headlining band was fired due to a conviction on a minor drugs charge. The band released their new album "Valley Rally" in June 2011. The band was featured at a 2012 four-day free festival in Kristianstad.

== Discography ==
=== Albums ===
Solo

- 2009: Calle Kristiansson
- 2013: Once in Kristianopel

As Calle & The Undervalleys

- 2010: Shades of Blue
- 2011: Valley Rally

=== Singles ===
Solo

- 2009: "Walking in Memphis"
- 2013: "Where life begun"

As Calle & the Undervalleys

- 2010: "Stars"
- 2011: "Lonely mothers holy land"
- 2012: "Back in the fast line"

Artist Collaborations

- 2010: "Target" with The Playtones
- 2011: "Echoes" with Ida Seve
- 2012: "Fairytale of Ney York" with Maryjet

=== In compilation albums ===
- 2009: "Walking in Memphis" in Det bästa från Idol 2009
