= Lars Eriksson (musician) =

Swedish singer-songwriter

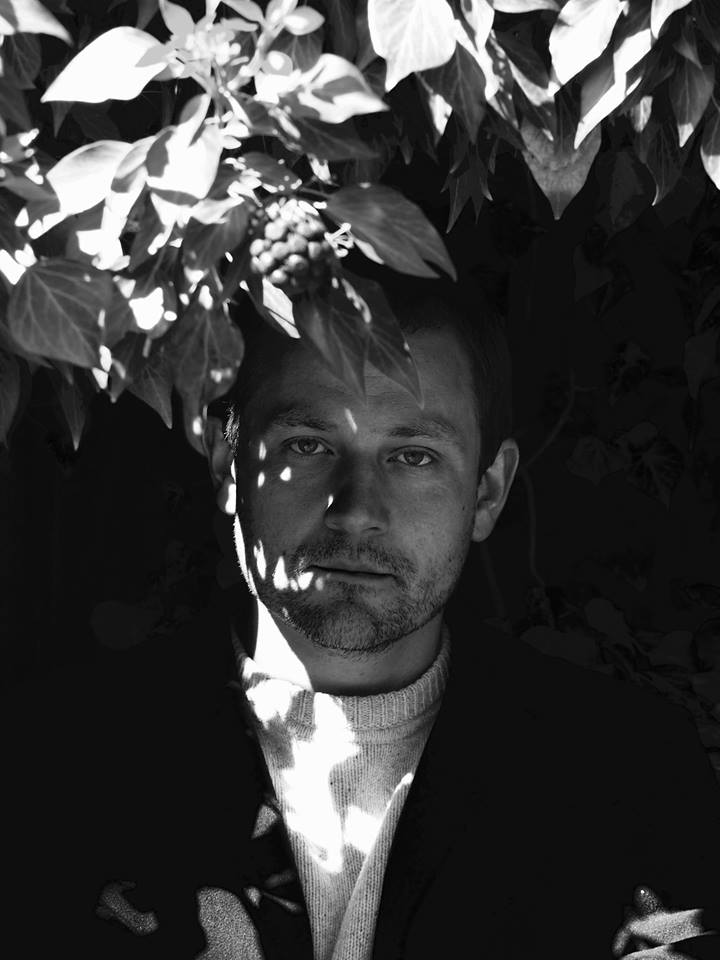
- Lars Eriksson 2019

Background information
- Born: Lars Erik Ludvig Eriksson; 1 April 1980 (age 46)
- Origin: Karlskoga, Sweden
- Genre: Folk music
- Occupations: Singer, songwriter, musician
- Instruments: Vocals, guitar
- Years active: 1997 – present
- Label: High Gear Music
- Formerly of: The Jisreels

Lars Erik Ludvig Eriksson (born 1 April 1980) is a Swedish singer-songwriter who became famous for his participation in Sweden's Idol 2008.

== Career ==
Eriksson was born in Karlskoga, and was just one year old when his family moved to Liberia in 1981, where Lars' father worked at a mining company. Moving back to Sweden in 1984, Lars began playing piano at age 5. He started writing music at age 9 and performed at school. He learned playing the guitar at around age 16. Together with three friends, he formed the band "The Jisreels" for three years (1997–1999). They played mainly local gigs, and toured the west coast in the summer of 1998.

By the time Eriksson applied to Swedish Idol auditions, he had reportedly written around 200 songs. Eriksson became a favorite of the competition from the day he auditioned when Idol jury member Anders Bagge promised to cooperate on a record after he heard him perform two songs on his audition in Lund. But he created big controversy when he became critical of the competition, even quoted as saying he did not wish to win the race. In November 2008, he was eliminated, finishing 7th overall.

He also recorded the single "Love" jointly with Elin Sigvardsson. [11] It reached No. 5 in the Swedish singles chart. Eriksson cooperated with Anders Bagge on an album in the autumn of 2009, but for unknown reasons, the album was not released until 11 February 2011. In May 2010, a collaboration began between Eriksson and Birger Pettersson Wiik and his record label HGM (High Gear Music) in Årjäng, with the single "Rejected Love" released digitally.

Eriksson then released two albums and one EP – "Rust and golden dust" (album, 2011), "Inconsequencia" (EP, 2011) & "Dictions and contradictions" (album, 2012) – before he completed a Degree of Bachelor of Arts in the field of Conservation at Uppsala University in Visby, Gotland (Sweden).

In 2013, Eriksson had a song ("The lonely journey called life") in the Swedish-Icelandic movie "Hemma", which won prize at Busan International Film Festival in South Korea as The Audience Choice. On 9 July 2013, Paulo Coelho shared Eriksson's song "Like the flowing river" on Facebook and on Twitter. The song was inspired by one of his books, by the same name.

After graduation in 2015, Eriksson worked a number of jobs as a conservation officer in places such as Gotland, The Åland Islands (Finland), Växjö, Kristianstad and Östersund. Eriksson has also worked as a carpenter in Portugal (2010), restored a medieval castle in Scotland (2014) and played the streets and buses of Cuzco, Peru (2015).

In 2017 Eriksson released two demo albums and one EP: “As it were” (demo album), "Lonely Jim" (EP) & "If you will" (demo album) . All sales revenue from the single and the EP "Lonely Jim" continually goes to UNHCR – The UN Refugee Agency. With those releases, the eight-year collaboration between Eriksson and the record company High Gear Music ended.

In 2018, Eriksson released independently the EP "Guds vän och allas fiende", which has received positive reviews in Italy and the US. The songs were written on the Swedish island of Gotland in the Baltic Sea during a three-year period when Eriksson lived and studied there. The songs cover experiences that happened there. The EP is partly recorded on Gotland, partly in Stockholm. The title of the EP means "Friend of God and enemy of all", which has its origins from a pirate gang, Vitaliebröderna, who made the seas around Gotland unsafe during the Middle Ages. Their battle-cry was "Friends of God and enemies of all!”

Eriksson is a member of the International music collective Kaip and is a board member of Dan Andersson-sällskapet (The Dan Andersson Society).

== Discography ==
=== Albums ===
- 2011: Rust and Golden Dust (reached No. 24 in Swedish Singles Chart)
- 2012: Dictions and contradictions
- 2017: As it were
- 2017: If you will

=== EP:s ===
- 2011: Inconsequencia
- 2017: Lonely Jim
- 2018: Guds vän och allas fiende
- 2019: Unman, vinaman & sunaman
- 2020: broken truths
- 2021: Hors-d'œuvres

=== Singles ===
- 2010: "Rejected Love"
- 2011: "Signs on every door step"
- 2012: "Magic life"
- 2012: "Hey ho, the road is long"
- 2017: "The winning cards"
- 2017: "Lonely Jim"
- 2018: "I love you now"
- 2018: "Breadcrumbs"
- 2019: "Gustav Hurtigs visa"

Featured in

- 2009: "Love" (Elin Ruth Sigvardsson featuring Lars Eriksson – reached No. 5 in Swedish Singles Chart)
- 2013: the Swedish-Icelandic movie "Hemma" (with the song "The lonely journey called life" from the album "Rust and golden dust)
