= Jay Smith (singer) =

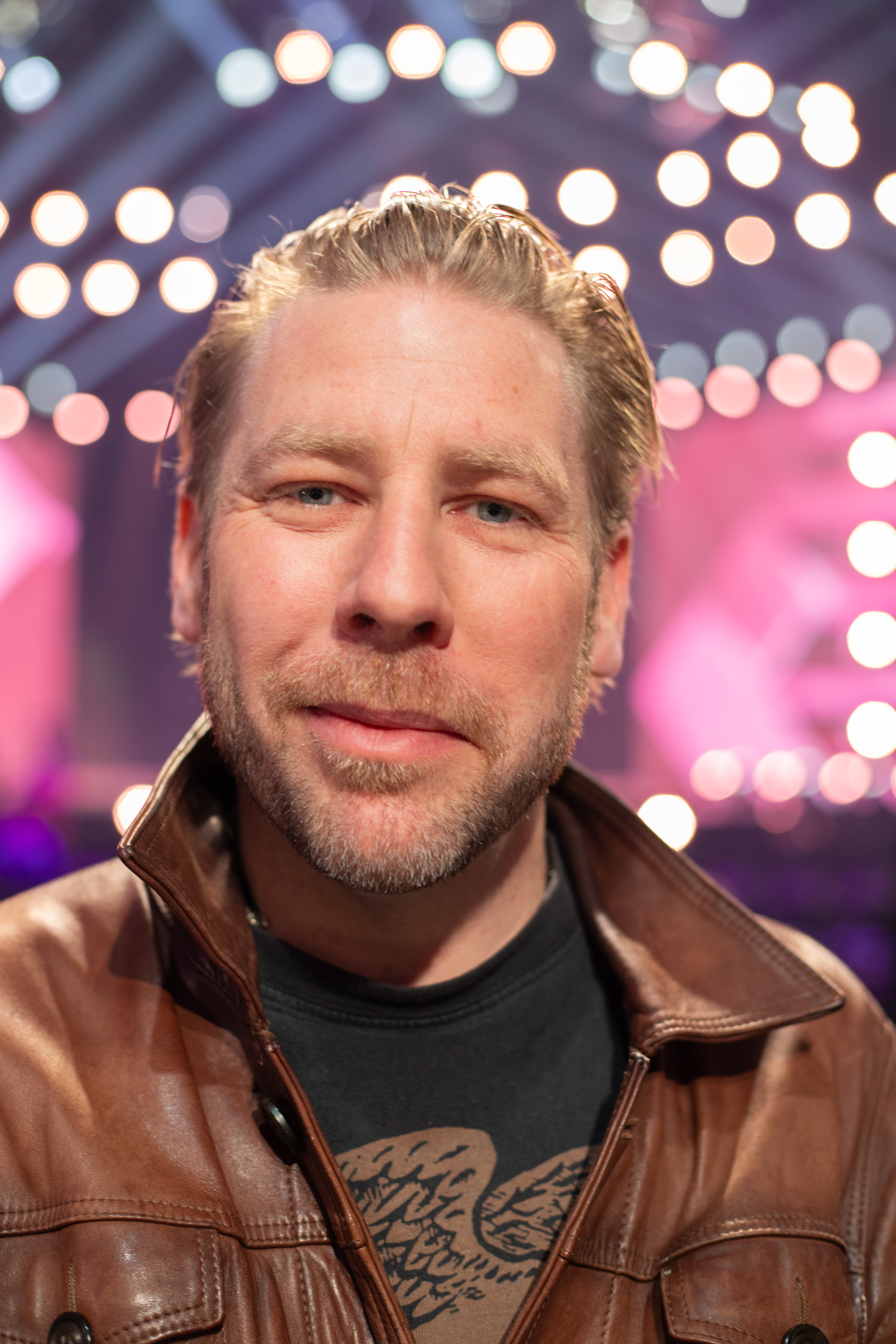
- Smith in 2024

Background information
- Born: Jay Jon Christopher Smith; 29 April 1981 (age 45)
- Origin: Helsingborg, Sweden
- Genres: Alternative rock; hard rock; blues rock; pop rock; country
- Occupation: Musician
- Instruments: Vocals, guitar
- Years active: 2009–present
- Label: GAIN Music Entertainment/Sony Music
- Website: YouTube Channel

Jay Jon Christopher Smith (born 29 April 1981) is a Swedish singer and guitarist. He won the Swedish Idol 2010 title, beating Minnah Karlsson in the 10 December 2010 final in the Ericsson Globe theater. Jay Smith also plays in the band Von Benzo, which has released two studio albums.

During Idol 2010, he created controversy announcing that he had smoked marijuana at one point during the program series. In an article in Expressen, Smith said that he could be sentenced to a fine for a minor drug offence. Conversely, TV4 television station allowed him to stay in the competition, provided he would not use drugs again during the show.

Smith's first solo single was "Dreaming People". He released his debut album, the self-titled Jay Smith, on 19 December 2010. The album shot straight to number one in its first week of release on the Swedish Albums Chart. It subsequently placed at number nine on the Swedish year-end chart. The album was also certified Platinum soon after its release.

Smith also appears in the two compilation album from Idol 2010, singing the song "All I Need Is You".

He participated in Melodifestivalen 2024 with the song "Back to My Roots", where he finished tenth in the final.

== Discography ==
=== Albums ===
- Jay Smith (2010)
- King of Man (2013)
- Young Guns (2019)
- Jaywalking (2025)

==== Collaborative albums ====
- Det bästa från Idol 2010 – Audition (2010)
- Det bästa från Idol 2010 (2010)

=== Singles ===
- "Dreaming People" (2010)
- "All I Need Is You" (2010)
- "King of Man" (2013)
- "Ode to Death (Little Sister)" (2013)
- "Keeps Me Alive" (2014)
- "God Damn You" (2015)
- "Neverneverland" (2015)
- "Out of Life" (2016)
- "Boomerang" with Smash Into Pieces (2017)
- "Ten Feet Off the Ground" (2018)
- "Roots" (2018)
- "Let My Heart Go" (2018)
- "My Everything" (2018)
- "Closing Time" (2019）
- "The End" featuring Maja Gullstrand (2022)
- "Back to My Roots" (2024)
- "Bar Thinking" (2024)
- "Home (Truckstops and Airports)" (2024)
- "Every Winter" (2024)
- "Badass High School Band" (2025)
- "Vegas Nights" (2025)
- "Liquid Courage" (2025)
- "Glasshouse" (2026)
- "Fast Lane" (2026)

==== Charting singles ====
List of charting singles
Title	Year	Peak chart positions	Album
Title	Year	SWE	Album
"Back to My Roots"	2024	3	Non-album single
"Every Winter"	2024	100	Non-album single

=== With Von Benzo ===
==== Albums ====
- Von Benzo (2009)
- Yes Kids It's True (2011)

==== Singles ====
- "Die Beautiful" (2009)
- "Bad Father, Bad Son" (2009)
- "Radio" (2011)
- "Addicted" (2013)

Preceded by Erik Grönwall	Idol winner Jay Smith (2010)	Succeeded by Amanda Fondell
