= Loulou LaMotte =

Swedish singer (born 1981)

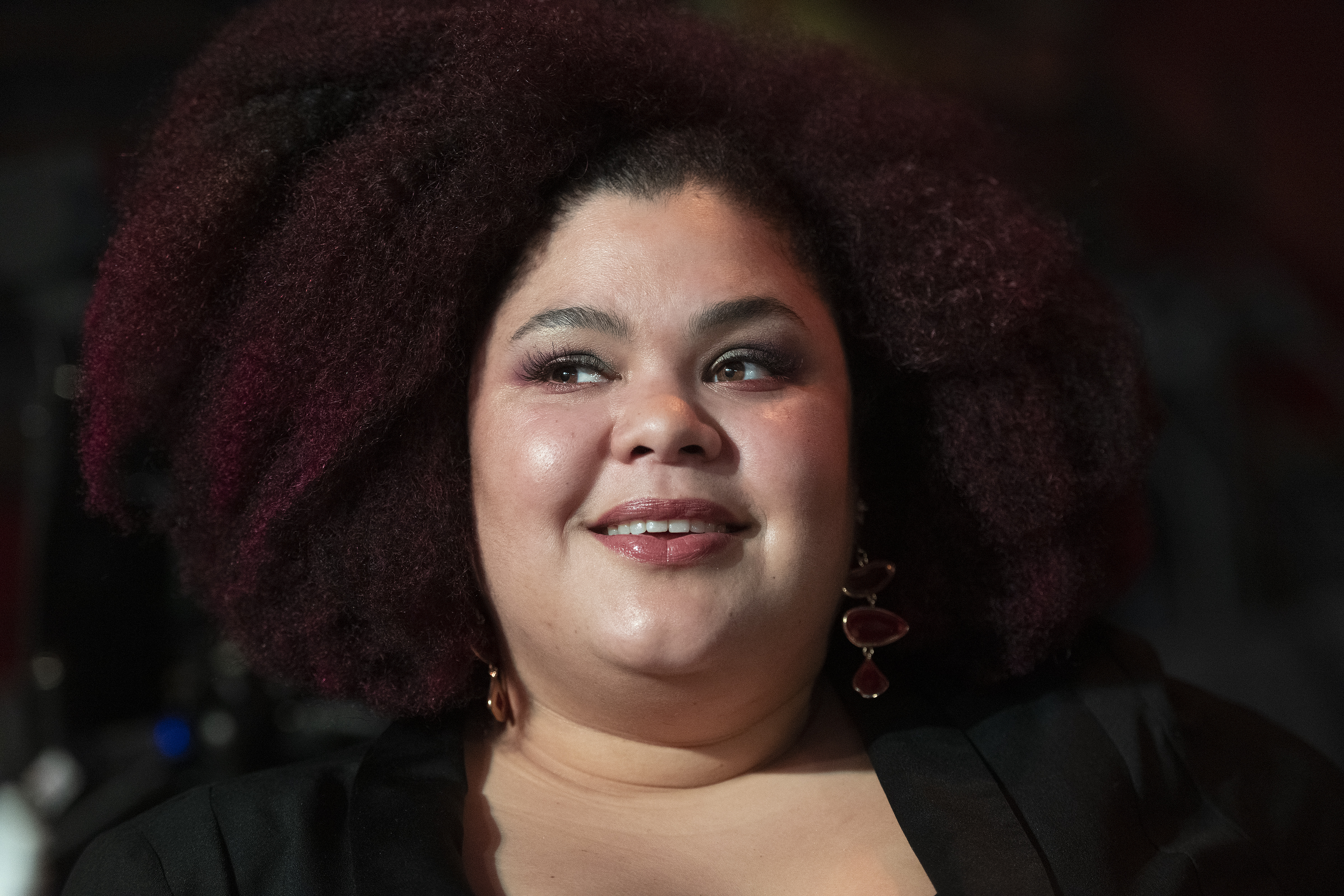
- LaMotte at Melodifestivalen 2020

Background information
- Born: 16 April 1981 (age 45); Malmö, Sweden
- Occupations: Singer; songwriter
- Years active: 2000–present
- Member of: The Mamas

Louise "Loulou" LaMotte (born 16 April 1981) is a Swedish singer. Since 2019 she has been a member of the vocal group The Mamas.

== Career ==
LaMotte is a member of the singer-songwriter band Soulectric. She has also written and sung with noted Swedish singers such as Jens Lekman, Advance Patrol, singer Pauline and Lilleman. LaMotte also contributed to the released record Höj din röst vol. 2. Loulou LaMotte was a contestant on the Swedish Idol 2008 on TV4.

=== Melodifestivalen 2013 ===
In 2013, she was in the backing vocals alongside Oscar Zia in the Behrang Miri song "Jalla Dansa Sawa" performed at the Melodifestivalen 2013 in the Swedish selection process for Eurovision Song Contest 2013. Although the song failed to make it to the finals after a duel elimination round won by Anton Ewald and his song "Begging", the song gained great popularity with the Swedish public and the single was released immediately after the competition reaching number 4 on Sverigetopplistan, the official Swedish Singles Chart.

=== Melodifestivalen 2019 ===
LaMotte, now as a member of the vocal group The Mamas, was one of the choirgirls behind John Lundvik in Melodifestivalen 2019 with the song "Too Late For Love". Lundvik won and got to represent Sweden in the Eurovision Song Contest 2019, where he and The Mamas placed fifth in the final.

=== Melodifestivalen 2020 ===
Along with The Mamas, LaMotte participated in Melodifestivalen 2020 with the song "Move". In the first semifinal the group qualified for the 7 March final in the Friends Arena. The Mamas won Melodifestivalen with 137 points and was planned to represent Sweden in the Eurovision Song Contest 2020, but the contest was canceled due to the coronavirus pandemic.

=== Melodifestivalen 2023 ===
LaMotte participated in Melodifestivalen 2023 as a solo artist with the song ”Inga sorger”.

== Discography ==
=== Singles ===
Solo

Title	Year	Peak positions
Title	Year	SWE
"Jul med dig"	2022	85
"Inga sorger"	2023	— (Note: "Inga sorger" did not enter the Swedish Singellista Chart, but peaked at number six on the Swedish Heatseeker Chart.)

Featured in

Title	Year	Peak positions	Certification	Album
Title	Year	SWE	Certification	Album
"Jalla Dansa Sawa" (credited to Behrang Miri)	2013	4	GLF: Platinum	Melodifestivalen 2013 song – non-album release (featuring vocals by Loulou LaMotte and Oscar Zia)
