= Alice Svensson =

Swedish singer (born 1991)

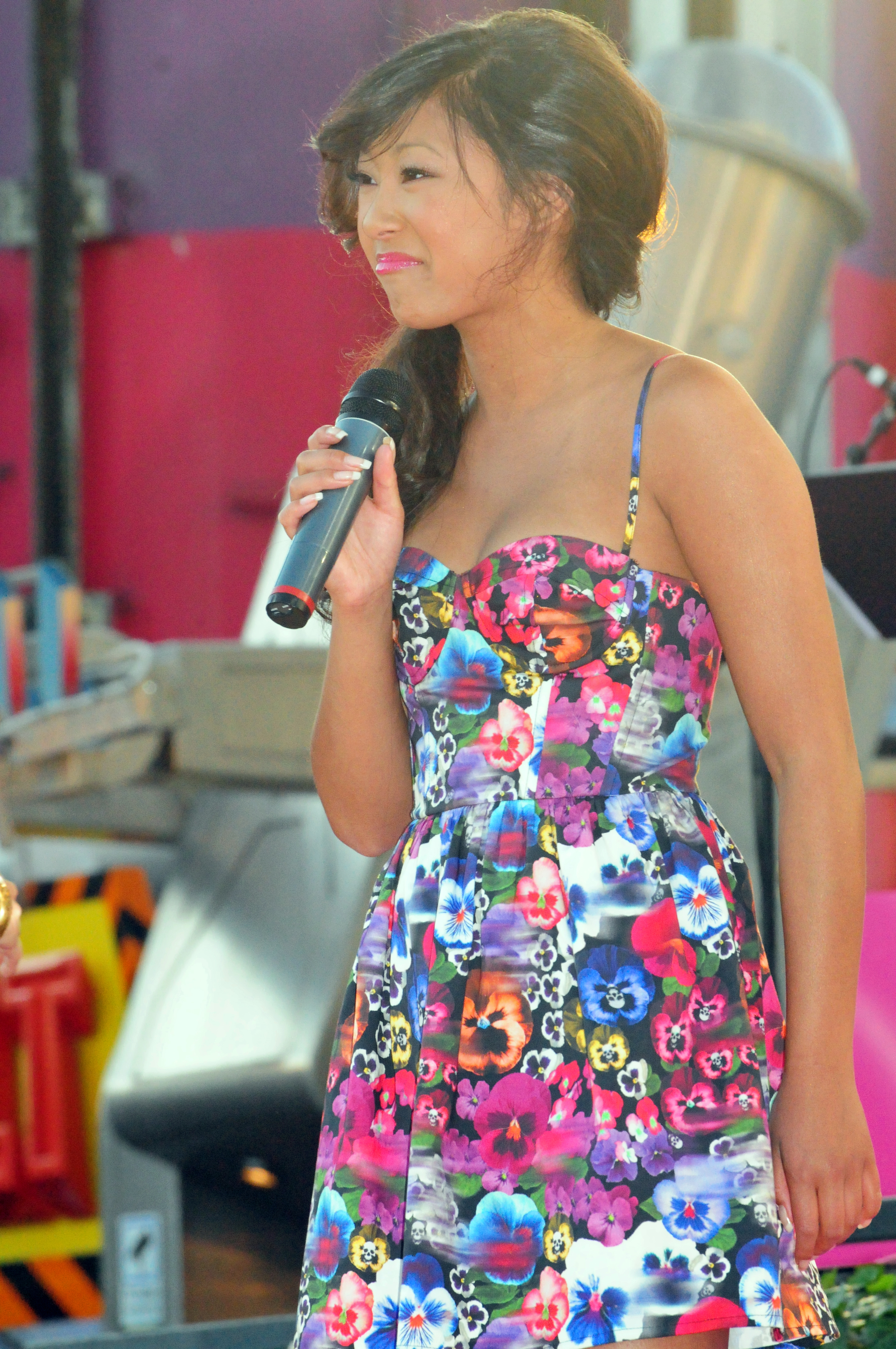
- Alice Svensson at Sommarkrysset in June 2009

Background information
- Born: Alice Cecilia Linh Svensson; 11 July 1991 (age 34); Hanoi, Vietnam
- Origin: Hedesunda, Sweden
- Genres: Pop; soul; rock
- Occupation: Singer
- Years active: 2004–present
- Labels: Sony

Alice Cecilia Linh Svensson (born 11 July 1991) is a Swedish singer. She finished as runner-up in Idol 2008 and later took part in Melodifestivalen 2017 with the song "Running with Lions".

== Early life ==
Svensson was born in Hanoi and adopted by a Swedish family at ten months old. She was raised in Hedesunda.

== Beginnings ==
Alice was a member of the pop group Popcorn, releasing a record with them at the age of 13. She has participated in a number of talent shows like Super Troupers in 2004, talent show Joker 2006 where Svensson became first-runner up, in Talang show in 2007, and the TV4 children's show Lattjo lajban. She won the talent show Popkorn 2007.

== Idol 2008 ==
Svensson took part in Idol 2008, the Swedish version of Pop Idol. She sang the following songs:

- Audition - "Ain't No Other Man"
- First qualifying week - "Beautiful Disaster"
- Second qualifying week - "Fighter"
- Third qualifying week - "Beautiful Disaster"
- 5-års theme - "These Words"
- 1990s theme - "Ironic"
- ABBA theme - "Lay All Your Love on Me"
- Various theme - "Min kärlek"
- Rock theme - "Heaven's on Fire"
- Soul theme - "I Say a Little Prayer
- Duets - "You're the One That I Want"
- Love theme - "Because of You" and "Crazy in Love"
- Gospel theme - "Shackles" and "Independent Woman"
- Jury selection - "Keep This Fire Burning" and "Girlfriend"
- Final - "So What" (own choice), "Heaven's on Fire" (viewers' choice) and "With Every Bit of Me" (final song).

On 14 November 2008, Swedish media reported that her rendition of "Heaven's on Fire" had been posted on the hard rock band Kiss' official homepage by members of the group. She finished first runner-up to eventual winner Kevin Borg.

== After Idol ==
In May 2009, she signed a recording contract and released her debut solo single "Lady Luck". In 2009, she also collaborated with the Swedish singer Jonathan Fagerlund in the latter's second album Welcome to My World where she was featured in Fagerlund's song "Save Our Yesterdays".

In 2017, she participated in Melodifestivalen with the song "Running with Lions". She placed fifth in the fourth heat and failed to advance further in the competition.

== Discography ==
=== Singles ===
With Popcorn

- "Popcorn"

Solo singles

Title	Year	Peak chart positions	Album
Title	Year	SWE	Album
"Heaven's on Fire"	2008	35	Non-album single
"Girlfriend"	2008	30	Non-album single
"Lady Luck"	2009	21	Non-album single
"I Wanna Live"	2010	—	Non-album single
"Running with Lions"	2017	81	Non-album single
"—" denotes a single that did not chart or was not released.

== Filmography ==
List of film credits
Year	Title	Role
2017	Efter tio	Herself - guest
2017	En natt på slottet	Herself
