= Peter Jihde =

Swedish television presenter

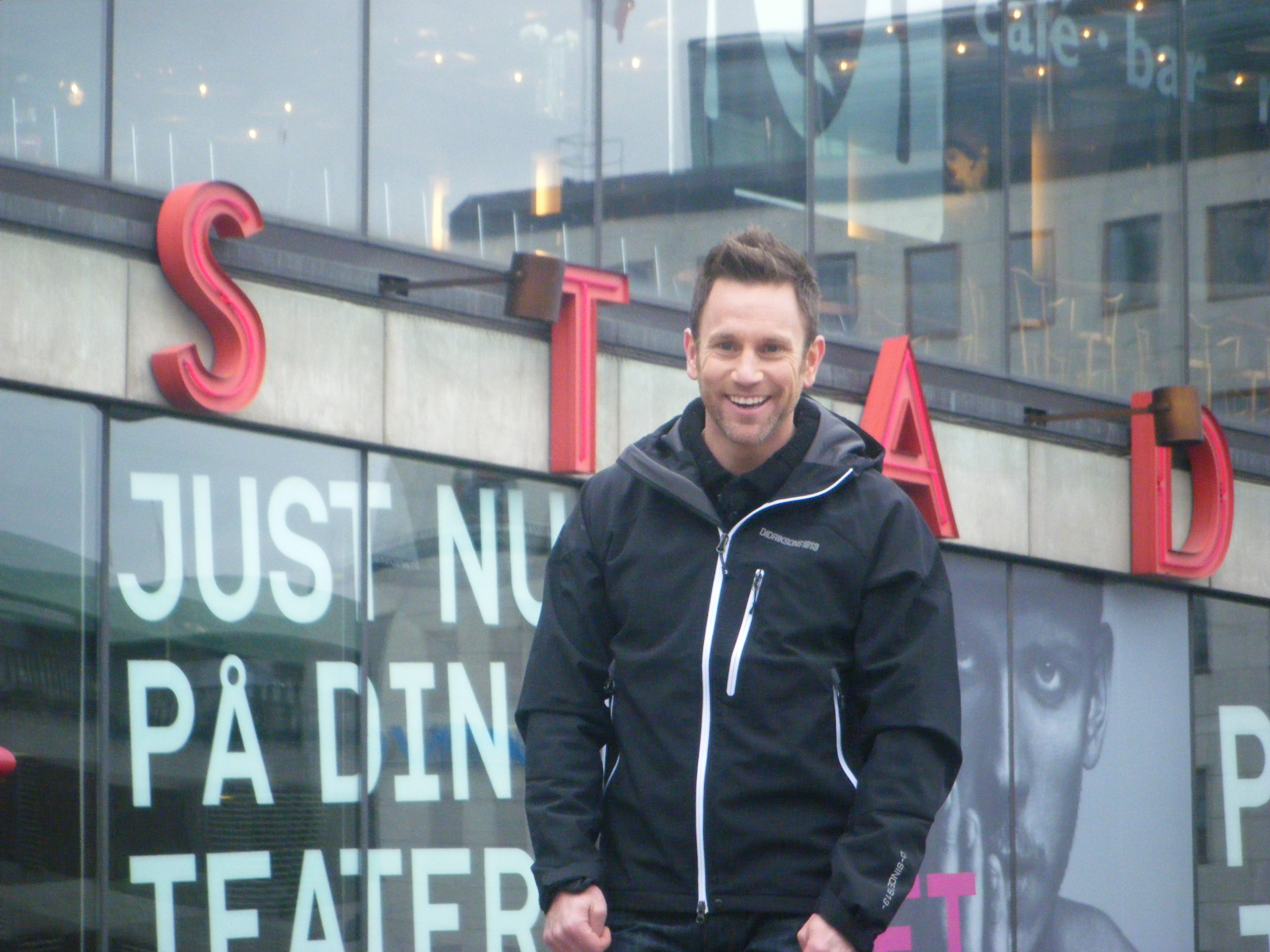
- Peter Jihde in May 2010
- Born: 12 July 1972 (age 53); Malmö, Sweden
- Occupation: Television presenter
- Years active: 2001-present
- Known for: Idol 2007, Idol 2008, numerous sports events
- Height: 1.76

Peter Jihde (born 12 July 1971) is a Swedish television host and sports reporter on TV4.

Jihde was born in Malmö, Sweden. He has hosted Sporten, Fotbollskväll, and has presented Olympic Games and football world championships. Jihde has also hosted his own talk show Hos Jihde on SVT. His brother, Niklas Jihde, is a former professional floorball player who currently also works in TV. He is also a host on the channel TV4 Sport.

Jihde has hosted Idol 2007, Idol 2008, Idol 2009 and Idol 2010 in Swedish Idol.
