= Sibel Kızavul =

Turkish volleyball player (born 1993)

Personal information
- Full name: Müberra Sibel Kızavul
- Born: January 10, 1993 (age 33)
- Died: Istanbul, Turkey
- Height: 188 cm (6 ft 2 in)
- Weight: 69 kg (152 lb)
- Spike: 300 cm (118 in)
- Block: 240 cm (94 in)

Volleyball information
- Position: Outside spiker

Career
Years	Teams
2000–2011	Eczacıbaşı VitrA
2012–2014	Sarıyer Belediyespor
2014	Maltepe Yalı Spor

National team
Turkey girls' youth national volleyball team
Turkey women's national volleyball team

Müberra Sibel Kizavul (born January 10, 1993) is a retired national level Turkish volleyball player, who last played for Maltepe Yalı Spor. She is 188 cm (74 in) tall and plays as outside spiker.

Club

Kizavul began playing volleyball in the infrastructure of Eczacıbaşı VitrA in 2000, and played in the youth and senior teams. She played five matches at the 2011–12 Women's CEV Cup with Eczacıbaşı VitrA.

In 2012, she transferred to Sarıyer Belediyespor, which became champion at the end of the 2011–12 season in the Turkish Women's Volleyball Second League and was promoted to the Turkish Women's Volleyball League.

In May 2014, she had to take a six-month break for rehabilitation following surgery on her knee.

International

In 2008, Kızavul was admitted to the Turkey girls' youth national volleyball team, and participated at the 2009 Girls' Youth European Volleyball Championship. In 2009, she was again a member of the girls' youth team.

== Awards ==
=== Clubs ===
- Turkish Girls' Championship (2006, 2007) – Gold Medal
- Turkish Cadet Girls' Championship (2006, 2007, 2008) – Gold Medal
- Turkish Secondary Schools Championship (2006, 2007) – Gold Medal
- Turkish High Schools Championship (2008, 2009) – Silver Medal
- Turkish High Schools Championship (2011) – Gold Medal
- Turkish Junior Women's Championship (2009) – Gold Medal
- Turkish Junior Women's League (2009, 2010, 2011) – Gold Medal
- Turkish Women's Second League (2011–12) – Gold Medal

=== International ===
- Balkan Cadets Championship (2008) – Gold Medal
- Balkan Cadets Championship (2009) – Silver Medal
