= Hedesunda =

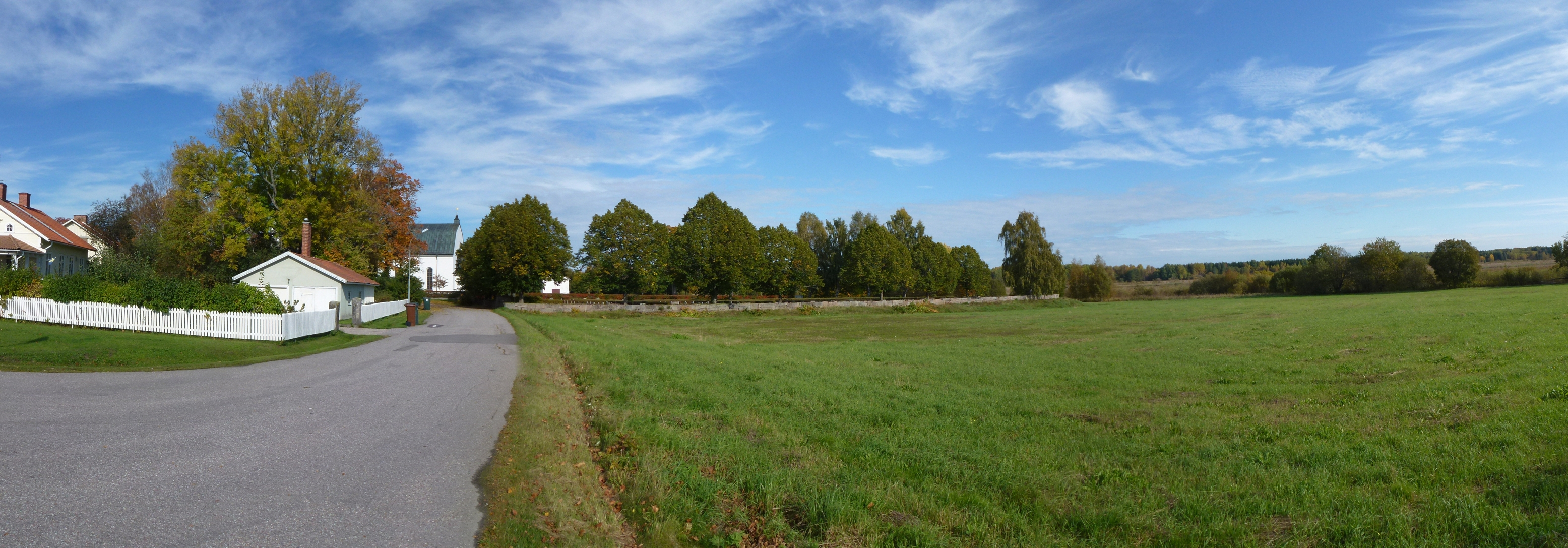

- Coat of arms

- Location within Sweden Gävleborg Location within Sweden
- Coordinates: 60°24′N 17°00′E
- Country: Sweden
- Province: Gästrikland
- County: Gävleborg County
- Municipality: Gävle Municipality

Area
  - Total: 1.68 km^{2} (0.65 sq mi)

Population (31 December 2010)
  - Total: 1,028
  - Density: 613/km^{2} (1,590/sq mi)
- Time zone: UTC+1 (CET)
  - Summer (DST): UTC+2 (CEST)

Hedesunda is a locality and a parish situated in Gävle Municipality, Gävleborg County, Sweden with 1,028 inhabitants as of 2010. The area used to be a municipality in its own right before being incorporated into Gävle.

The urban area in Hedesunda consists of the village of Brunn. Brunn and its surroundings has a population of about 1,100. Before being incorporated the municipality held about 2800 people and in the beginning of the 20th century the number was around 5 000 citizens. The population has been rising since the beginning of the 21st century. The surrounding landscape consists of low-lying forest, moors and peat bog.

== Overview ==
The surroundings give opportunity for fishing and other outdoor recreation near Dalälven.

In Brunn there is a reconstruction of a banked silver mine that used to be located in the area. The project, called Brunns Silfvergrufva, is supported with grants from the European Union. Preliminary studies have dated the age of the original mine to date from the thirteenth to the 14th century.

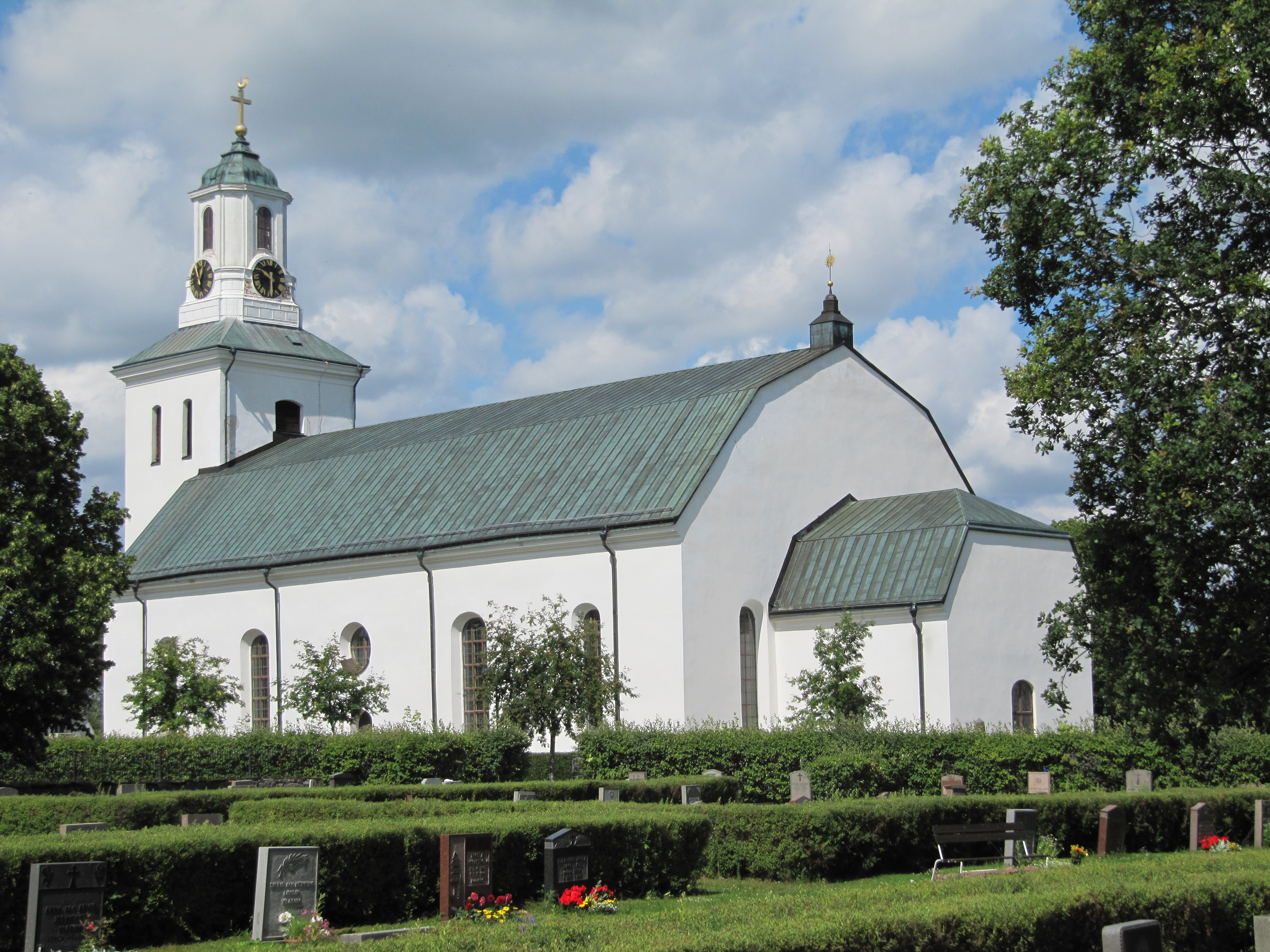
Hedesunda church

Uppsala and Gävle are within an hour's drive by car. Travel time from the Swedish national airport Arlanda is about 90 minutes.

The area of Ön is an island which is a part of a boulder ridge (esker). Ön is the cultural center of the area and is located near Dalälven and has bridges at both ends. If you enter Hedesunda from the south you will reach Ön by turning right 10 kilometer after Tärnsjö at the national road 56 and drive towards Söderfors. In the north of Hedesunda you can reach Ön by way of national road 56 towards Valbo, where you can find the largest shopping centre in the area. You can also reach Hedesunda by driving along the European route E4 and turning towards Söderfors.
Ön is a part of a 100 km long esker, a long, winding ridge of stratified sand and gravel which occur in glaciated and formerly glaciated regions of Europe and North America.

At Ön there is a dancing place, small bays, open landscape and a scenic landscape. There is also a camping ground, Hedesunda Camping, with cabins and places for caravans and tents. At the camping spot you can reach the beach called Sandsnäsbadet.

== History ==
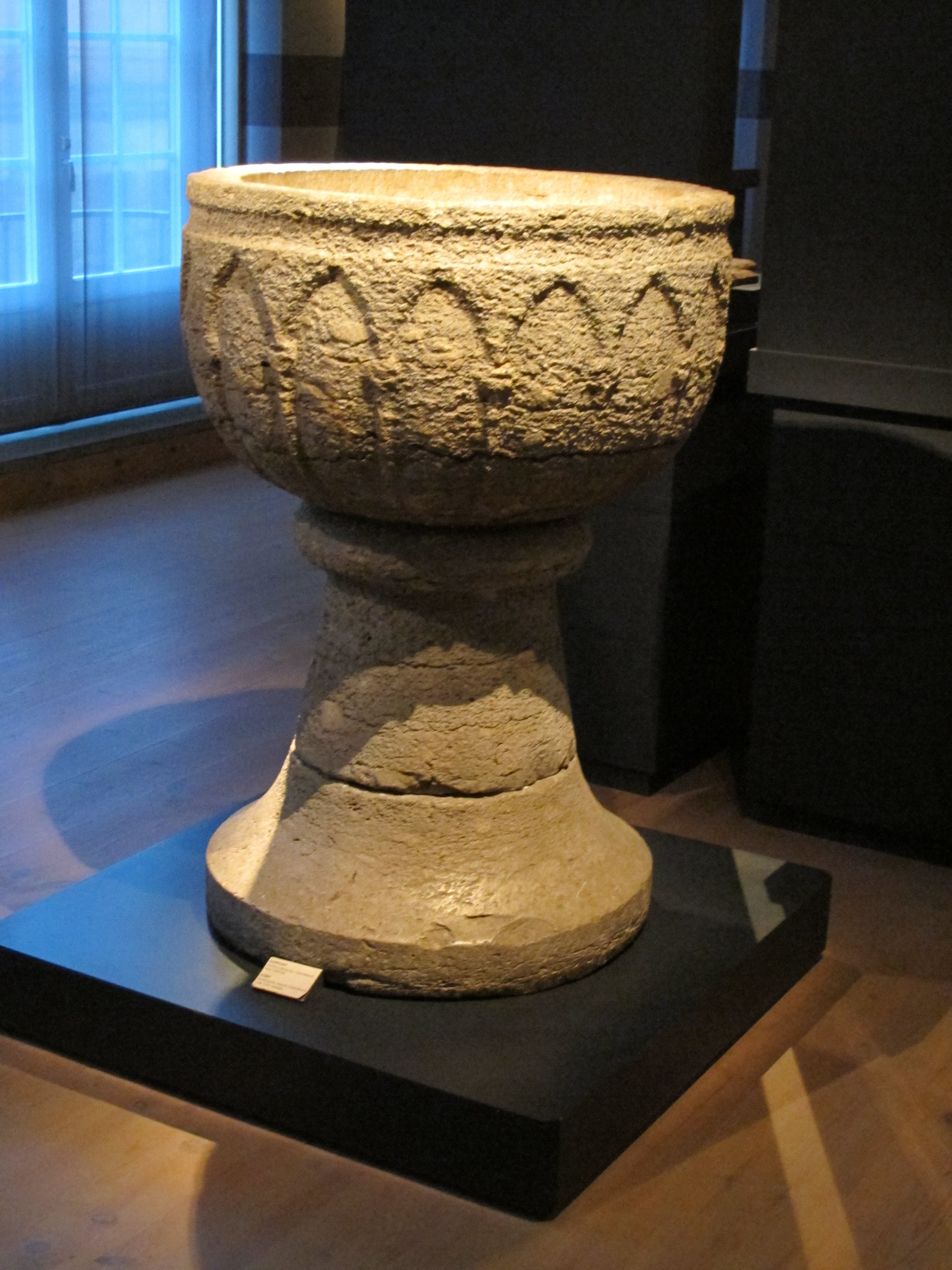
Hedesunda Church font, late 13th century, in Swedish History Museum, Stockholm

Hedesunda has evidence of continuous habitation from the Neolithic era around 3500 BCE until today. Especially interesting is the findings after early description of iron. The oldest historical documentation in the area consist of runic stones and a very rare stone carving dated to 970 CE. It is rare because such carvings usually do not appear north of lake Mälaren. Gästriklands only ancient castle is located in Hedesunda.

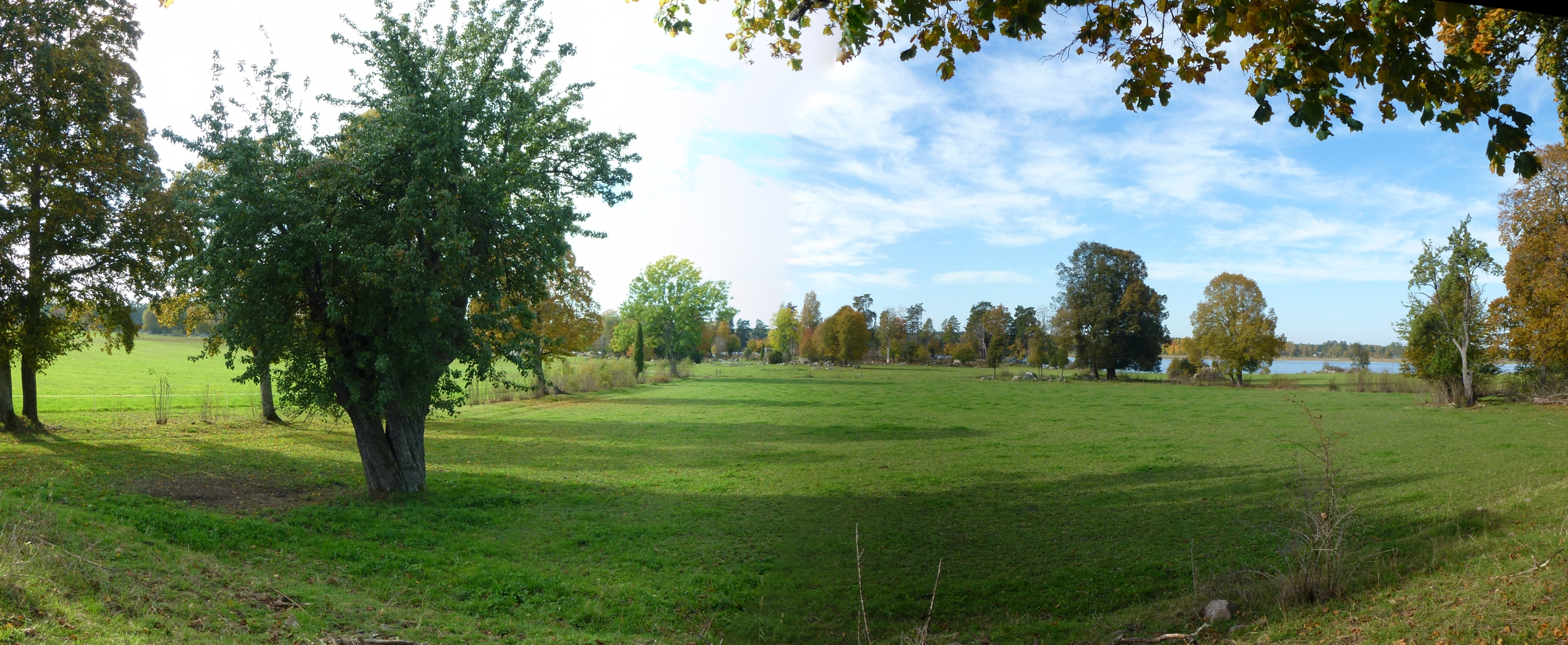
Panorama of island Ön outside Hedesunda

It is written on parchment or paper that the archbishop Nils Allesson visited Hedesunda parish in 1302 CE. "Svarta-brevet" is a collection of notes on demarcation dating from the year 1402 CE. In this early document some 16 small villages around Hedesunda are mentioned.

The parish registration from Hedesunda has been diligently kept and more than 30.000 people are registered. This information has been made into a book for genealogists, in two parts of 900 pages each. The latest version was printed in 1997.

== Small villages of Hedesunda ==
Backa, Berg, Bodarna, Brunn, Brunnsheden, Byn, Bäck, Bälgsnäs, Böle, Dalkarlsbo, Främlingshem, Finnböle, Flösta, Gammelsäll, Gisselbo, Gräsbäcken, Gundbo, Hade, Hadeholm, Haget, Hallsbo, Harv, Holmen, Ingevara, Jugansbo, Kessmansbo, Koffsta, Kulla, Kungsgården, Kågbo, Landa, Lurberg, Lurbo, Lövåsen, Mälbo, Nordanbro, Norra Färjsundet, Oppåker, Rångsta, Rönäs, Sevallbo, Skallbo, Smedsäng, Sundby, Svarta, Södra Färjsundet, Torsbo, Ullanda, Utomälven, Vall, Vibro, Vinnersjö, Västbyggeby, Ålbo, Ås, Ölbo, Ön, Österbyggebo and Östveda.

== Population age distribution ==
- Total (year 1998) 2 843 people
- Age distribution:
- 0 – 6 years, 239
- 7 –15 years, 365
- 16 – 24 years, 248
- 25 – 64 years, 1429
- 65 – 74 years, 270
- 75 years and elder, 297

85% of the population lives in small houses.

== Sports ==
The following sports clubs are located in Hedesunda:

- Hedesunda IF
