= Andreas Weise =

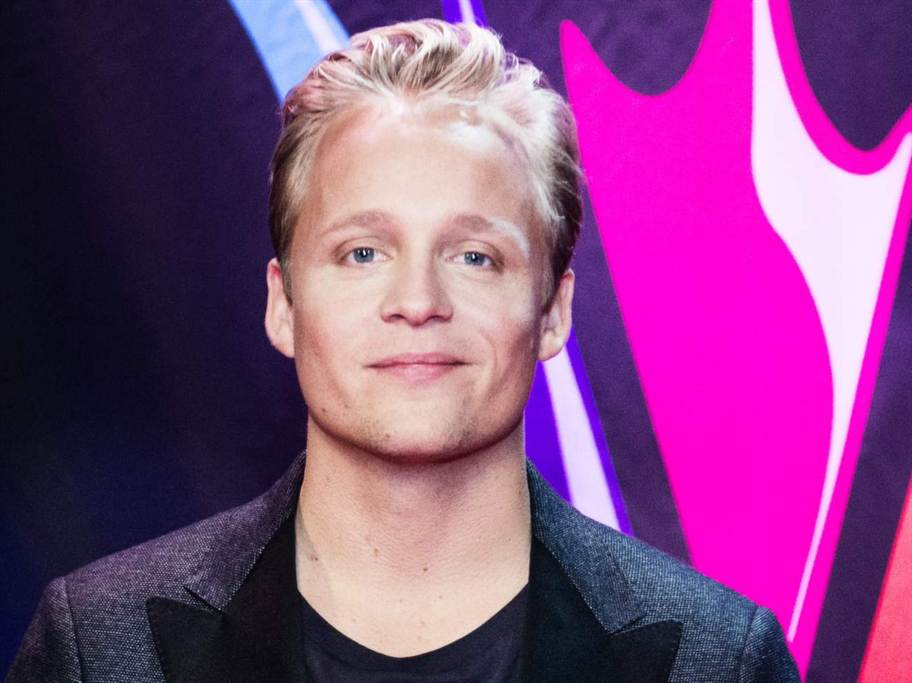

Background information
- Born: 18 August 1986 (age 39)
- Origin: Stockholm, Sweden
- Genres: Big band, traditional pop, jazz, soul
- Occupations: Musician, songwriter
- Instruments: Vocals, guitar
- Years active: 2010–present
- Labels: Sony Music
- Website: andreasweise.se https://www.facebook.com/andreasweisemusic

Andreas Georg Fredrik Weise (born 18 August 1986) is a Swedish singer, songwriter, TV host and entertainer.

He finished in fifth place on the Swedish Idol 2010.

== Genres and musical expression ==
Weise's music has influences from genres such as soul, jazz and swing, he has on several occasions been described as a "crooner". He is not classically trained but has developed his vocal style himself. Weise is a tenor.

Weise is known to be an "entertainer". He's inspired by great musicians as Frank Sinatra, Stevie Wonder and Sammy Davis Jr. Thereto Weises music and style is often compared to contemporary artists such as Robbie Williams and John Newman.

In addition to his musical talent, Weise often appears in humorous contexts on Swedish TV shows.

== Career ==
=== Swedish Idol 2010 ===
Andreas Weise early on distinguished himself in the competition by his choice of classical song and as the "entertainer" of the show. He finished in fifth place.

Below is a list of performances that Weise did during Swedish Idol 2010.

Etapp	Låttitel	Originalartist	Tema
Audition	"Sunny"		-
Qualifying round	"I believe I can fly"	R. Kelly	
Qualifying round	"Ain't no sunshine"	Bill Withers	
Final 1	"For once in my life"	Frank Sinatra	Det här är jag
Final 2	"Feel"	Robbie Williams	Min idol
Final 3	"All you need is love"	The Beatles	The Beatles
Final 4	"Baby I love your way"	Big Mountain	90-tal
Final 5	"Higher & Higher"	Jackie Wilson	Kärlek
Final 6	"Start me up" "Gimme some lovin'" tillsammans med Olle Hedberg	The Rolling StonesThe Spencer Davis Group	Rock
Final 7	"She's a lady""Celebration"	Tom JonesKool and the Gang	Klassiker

=== After Swedish Idol ===
He also participated on the popular TV show Let's Dance where he finished eighth.

=== Andreas Weise (2012-2013) ===
On 28 May 2012, he released his first single, "Another Saturday Night", a cover of Sam Cooke from his self-titled album Andreas Weise that was released in August 2012. Weise himself has written many of the songs on the album. The album entered the Swedish chart at number two.

==== List of songs on the album ====
1. "Another Saturday Night" (Sam Cooke)
2. "Something Beautiful" (text och music: Figge Boström/Michael Michailoff)
3. "Each Time We Meet" (text och music: Andreas Weise)
4. "Shine" (text och music: Andreas Öberg/Andreas Weise/Dan Sundquist)
5. "Turn of the Waterworks" (text och music: Andreas Weise/Andreas Öberg/Chris Antblad)
6. "Me and Mrs Jones" (Kenneth Gamble/Leon Huff/Cary Gilbert)
7. "She's The Deal" (text och music: Andreas Öberg/Chris Antblad)
8. "Never gonna let you down" (text och music: Dan Sundquist/Andreas Öberg/Andreas Weise)
9. "Quiet nights of quiet stars" (Antonio Carlos Jobim/Eng. text:Eugene Lees)
10. "Love Making Love (6.30am)" (text och music: Andreas Weise/Andreas Öberg)
11. "Sunday Morning" (Adam Levine/Jesse Carmichael/Michael Madden/Ryan Jusick/James Valentine)
12. "Fragile" (text och music: Mats Tärnfors/Per Hed)

=== 2014: TV-host for Idol Extra, Sinatra Christmas tour and the Christmas Dream Album ===
In the fall of 2014 Weise was the host of Idol Extra together with Malin Stenbäck from Mix Megapol. He also did a performance on the show with the song "Fly me to the moon".

During Christmas Weise did a nationwide tour, "Sinatra Christmas" together with Christer Sjögren and Gunhild Carling. The trio visited 16 cities in Sweden.

On 25 November 2014, Weise released a Christmas EP: Christmas Dream consisting of four newly composed Christmas songs. The album was released on Spotify and was a great success, especially the single Christmas Dream became popular on Swedish radio stations.

=== Melodifestivalen 2015 ===
On 25 November 2014, SVT announced that Weise would participate i en 2015 edition of Melodifestivalen. The song "Bring out the fire" was written by Thomas G:son, Henrik Jansson and Anton Malmberg Hård af Segerstad.

The song competed in the third round of the competition, taking place in Östersund 21 February 2015. The song came third which meant that it got another chance to compete in the "Second Chance" competition in Helsingborg. All together the song got 450, 923 votes in the semifinal. The song became an instant hit among viewers and reached top 50 on the Spotifylist.

"Bring out the fire" became a great success for Weise who spent the summer of 2015 touring with the song.

On 17 June. 2015, Weise release the single "More". The song is written by Andreas Weise himself, together with Fabian Ruben and Simon Erics.

== Music ==
=== Albums ===
Title	Details	Peak chart positions
Title	Details	SWE
Andreas Weise	Released: 29 August 2012; Label: Sony Music, Columbia; Format: Digital download, CD	2

Title	Details
The Circle	Released: 28 April 2023; Label: Firefly Entertainment, Kennel Music Group; Format: Digital download

=== EPs ===
Title	Details	Peak chart positions
Title	Details	SWE
Christmas Dream	Released: 25 November 2014; Label: Firefly Entertainment AB - X5 Music Group; Format: Digital download	—
Before Christmas	Released: 2016	—

=== Singles ===
Title	Year	Peak chart positions	Certifications	Album
Title	Year	SWE	Certifications	Album
"Another Saturday Night"	2012	—		Andreas Weise
"Something Beautiful"	2012	—		Andreas Weise
"Christmas Dream"	2014	84		Christmas Dream EP
"Bring Out the Fire"	2015	56		Non-album singles
"More"	2015	—		Non-album singles
"Before Christmas"	2016	51		Before Christmas
"Hold Me Close"	2017	—		
"Christmas Peacetime"	2018	— (Note: "Christmas Peacetime" did not chart on the Sverigetopplistan, but peaked at number one on the Swedish Heatseeker chart.)		
"—" denotes a single that did not chart or was not released in that territory.
