= Idol 2010 (Sweden) =

- Season 2010
- Hosted by: Peter Jihde
- Judges: Anders Bagge; Laila Bagge Wahlgren; Andreas Carlsson
- Winner: Jay Smith
- Runner-up: Minnah Karlsson
- Finals venue: Ericsson Globe

Release
- Original network: TV4

Season chronology
- ← Previous; Season 2009 Next → Season 2011

The seventh season of Swedish Idol premiered on September 7, 2010 and concluded in December 2010 and was broadcast by TV4. Judges Anders Bagge, Laila Bagge Wahlgren and Andreas Carlsson continued to judge the show's contestants for their third year, along with, for the fourth consecutive year, Peter Jihde as host.

== Changes from Season 6 ==
- The ten finals will be held on Fridays, 5 of them in a studio in Stockholm and the other five one each at Göteborg, Karlstad, Malmö and Luleå. The finals will be again at the Globe Arena in Stockholm. It is only the second year that the show is on tour in various cities, and this year, the tour is more extended than last year and it will be the fewest shows from studio in the capital Stockholm.
- The official trailer was released in mid-August and the theme for it is "Aiming for the stars". The video features the three judges entering a spaceship and heading for the stars, searching for the next Swedish Idol. Former contestants, Agnes and Amanda Jensen is also featured in the video.

== Regional auditions phase ==
The large number of applicants to the Idol in both Göteborg and Stockholm prompted the organizers to extend auditions by one day. According to TV4, it was also a record number who sought to Idol in the other urban areas. So far, around 11,700 people applied for Idol in 2010, which is a record for Swedish Idol.

Episode Air Date	Audition City	Date	Audition Venue	Golden Tickets
September 9/10, 2010	Gothenburg	April 10–11, 2010	Svenska Mässan	23
September 10, 2010	Karlstad	April 18, 2010	Nöjesfabriken	19
September 15, 2010	Malmö	April 24, 2010	Folkets Park	33
September 14, 2010	Luleå	May 2, 2010	Coop Arena	12
September 7/8th, 2010	Stockholm	May 8–9, 2010	Kulturhuset	30
Total Golden Tickets				128

== Elimination Chart ==
Legend
Did Not Perform	Female	Male	Top 24	Wild Card	Top 11	Winner

Safe	Save Last	Eliminated

Stage:		Quarter				Wild; Card	Semi	Finals									
Week:		09/27	09/28	09/29	09/30	10/01		10/08	10/15	10/22	10/29	11/05	11/12	11/18	11/26	12/03	12/10
Place	Contestant	Result															
1	Jay Smith			Top 13													Winner
2	Minnah Karlsson			Top 13					Saved						Btm 2	Btm 2	Runner-Up
3	Olle Hedberg				Elim	VC								Btm 2		Elim	
4	Linnea Henriksson				Top 13								Btm 2		Elim		
5	Andreas Weise		Top 13				Btm 3					Btm 2		Elim			
6	Elin Blom		Elim			JC							Elim				
7	Geir Rönning				Top 13					Btm 2	Btm 2	Elim					
8	Daniel Norberg			Elim		JC					Elim						
9	Linda Varg	Top 13						Btm 2		Elim							
10	Alice Hagenbrant		Top 13						Wdrw								
11	Sassa Bodensjö		Elim			JC		Elim									
12-13	Chris Andersen	Top 13					Elim										
12-13	Madeleine Finck-Björgen	Elim				JC	Elim										
Heat 4	Alicia Francke Bocio				Elim												
Heat 4	Freja Sterner				Elim												
Heat 4	Jimmy Claeson				Elim												
Heat 3	Malin Brännlund			Elim													
Heat 3	Michaela Osberg Dalja			Elim													
Heat 3	Simon Lingmerth			Elim													
Heat 2	Björn Nagander		Elim														
Heat 2	Emil Carlsson		Elim														
Heat 1	Janine Nyman	Elim															
Heat 1	Jonathan Garcés	Elim															
Heat 1	Sebastian Krantz	Elim															

- On October 15 Minnah Karlsson and Alice Hagenbrant were the bottom two with Minnah being eliminated. However, since Alice withdrew shortly after Minnah was allowed to return.

== Idol 2010 albums ==
Det bästa från Idol 2010 (The Best from Idol 2010) is a sampling Swedish Idol 2010 shows. In addition, at the beginning of the 10th series, an initial album was released containing performances during auditions to this year's series.
