= Minnah Karlsson =

Swedish singer (born 1989)

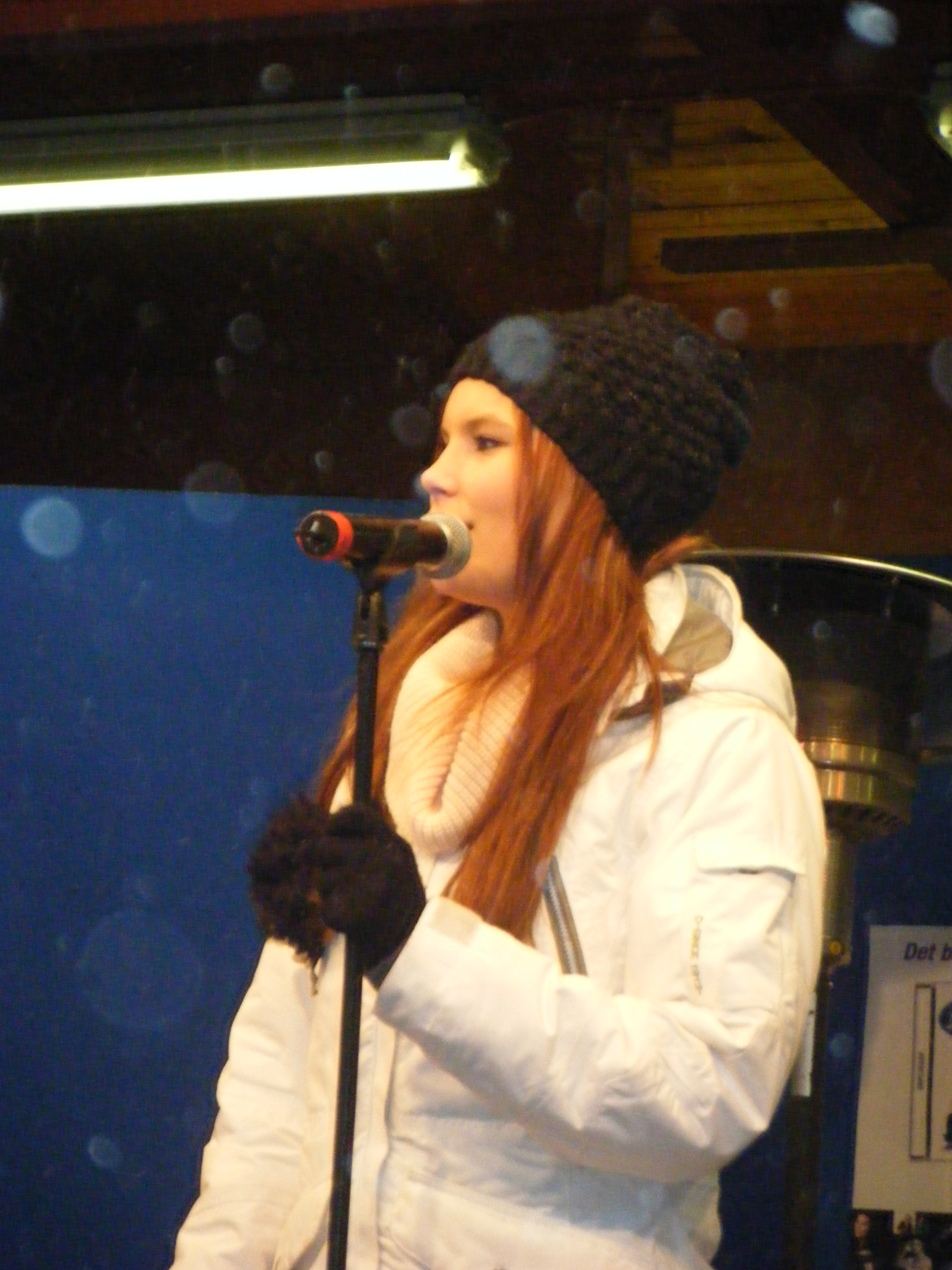
- Minnah during a performance 2010

Background information
- Born: Minnah Caroline Karlsson; 26 March 1989 (age 37)
- Origin: Hallstavik, Sweden
- Genres: Pop rock
- Occupation: Singer
- Instrument: Piano
- Years active: 2010–present
- Label: Sony Music
- Website: www.minnahkarlsson.se

Minnah Caroline Karlsson (born 26 March 1989 in Hallstavik) is a Swedish singer. She achieved fame when on the television singing competition Idol in 2010, where she came in second, losing to Jay Smith. She is also one of the few participants on any of the Idol series who was voted out, to then come back and got to the final.

Although Karlsson came in second place, Sony Music signed a contract with her. Her debut album, Minnah Karlsson, was released on 19 December 2010 for digital downloads, and for in-store purchases on 20 December, only one week after the finals.

Karlsson was also included in the Idol Live Tour, in which she and the other 9 final contestants toured around Sweden. Adam Lambert praised her for her cover of his song "Whataya Want from Me", and the song was included on her debut album.

== Family ==
Karlsson is the daughter of Heli and Bengt Karlsson and has two brothers. Her mother is from Finland.

== Discography ==
=== Singles ===
- 2010 -All I Need Is You (also available in Det bästa från Idol 2010)

=== Compilation ===
- 2010 -Det Bästa Från Idol 2010 - Audition (Not Ready To Make Nice)
- 2010 -Det Bästa Från Idol 2010 (Piece of My Heart)

=== Albums ===
- 2010 -Minnah Karlsson
