= Big Time Rush discography =

Band discography

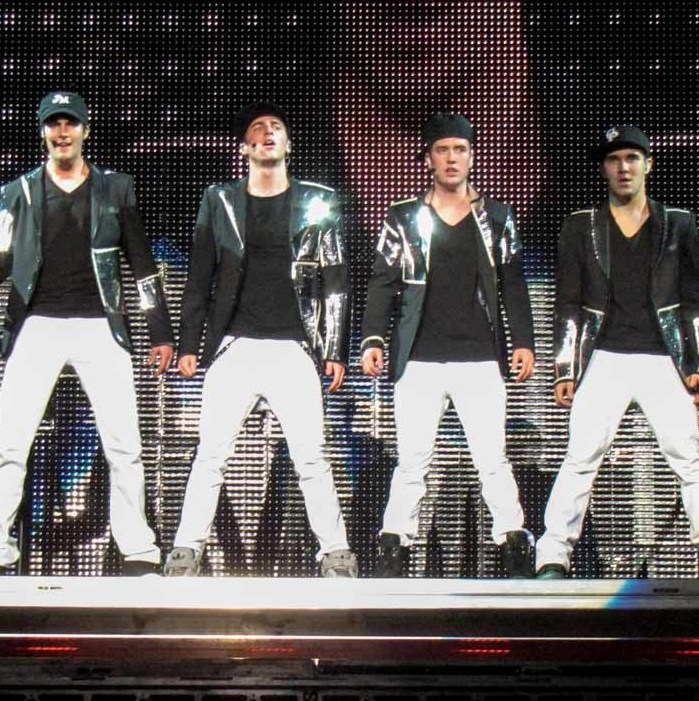
- Big Time Rush performing in February 2012. From left to right: James Maslow, Kendall Schmidt, Logan Henderson and Carlos PenaVega
- Studio albums: 4
- Extended plays: 3
- Compilation albums: 2
- Singles: 13
- Video albums: 1
- Music videos: 21
- Promotional singles: 8

The discography of Big Time Rush, an American pop group, consists of four studio albums, three extended plays, eleven singles, 21 music videos, eight promotional singles and 23 other charted songs.

The group's first album BTR was released on October 11, 2010. It has been certified platinum by the RIAA. The album peaked at number three on Billboard 200 and their single "Boyfriend", peaked at number 72 on US Billboard Hot 100. The song is certified platinum in the United States. Their second album Elevate peaked at number 12 on Billboard 200 and is certified gold by RIAA. Their single "Windows Down" peaked at number 97 on Billboard Hot 100. In 2012 the band released a soundtrack, Big Time Movie Soundtrack for their film Big Time Movie. The soundtrack peaked at 44 on Billboard 200. Their third album 24/Seven peaked at number four on Billboard 200. As of 2019, the band has sold over 5.8 million songs and albums in the US according to Luminate Data. In early 2023, they announced their fourth album Another Life which was released on June 2, 2023. As of March 2026, the band's total record sales have exceeded over 15 million globally.

== Albums ==
=== Studio albums ===
List of studio albums, with selected chart positions, sales figures and certifications
Title	Album details	Peak chart positions										Sales	Certifications
Title	Album details	US	AUT	BEL (WA)	GER	IRE	ITA	MEX	POL	SWI	UK	Sales	Certifications
BTR	Released: October 11, 2010; Formats: CD, digital download, streaming; Label: Nickelodeon, Columbia	3	12	113	16	17	24	9	—	18	14	US: 700,000 (Note: Sales of BTR in the United States as of July 19, 2012.)	RIAA: Platinum; AMPROFON: Gold
Elevate	Released: November 21, 2011; Formats: CD, digital download, streaming; Label: Nickelodeon, Columbia	12	32	189	33	61	29	13	16	76	72	US: 208,000 (Note: Sales of Elevate in the United States as of February 29, 2012.)	RIAA: Gold
24/Seven	Released: June 7, 2013; Formats: CD, digital download, streaming; Label: Nickelodeon, Columbia	4	35	124	42	—	40	1	38	43	—	US: 35,000 (Note: First week sales of 24/Seven in the United States as of June 19, 2013.)	AMPROFON: Gold
Another Life	Released: June 2, 2023; Formats: CD, LP, digital download, streaming; Label: Bought The Rights, BMG	— (Note: Another Life did not enter the Billboard 200, but peaked at number 15 on the US Billboard Top Current Albums Sales component chart.)	—	—	—	—	—	—	—	—	—		
"—" denotes releases that did not chart or were not released in that territory.

=== Compilation albums ===
List of compilation albums, with selected chart positions
Title	Album details	Peak chart positions
Title	Album details	FRA
Big Time Rush – Ultimate Fan Edition	Released: March 16, 2016; Label: Nickelodeon, Columbia; Formats: CD	—
The Greatest Hits	Released: June 24, 2016; Label: Nickelodeon, Columbia; Formats: CD, digital download	8
"—" denotes releases that did not chart or were not released in that territory.

=== Video albums ===
List of video albums
Title	Album details
Elevation	Released: August 6, 2013; Label: Nickelodeon, Columbia; Formats: Digital download, DVD

== Extended plays ==
List of extended plays, with selected chart positions
Title	EP details	Peak chart positions			
Title	EP details	US	US Kid	US OST	CAN
Best of Season 1	Released: November 26, 2010; Label: Sony, Columbia; Formats: CD, digital download	—	—	—	—
Holiday Bundle	Released: November 30, 2010; Label: Sony, Columbia; Formats: Digital download	—	—	—	33
Big Time Movie Soundtrack	Released: March 6, 2012; Label: Sony, Columbia; Formats: CD, digital download	44	2	4	—
"—" denotes releases that did not chart or were not released in that territory.

== Singles ==
List of singles, with selected chart positions, showing year released and album name
Title	Year	Peak chart positions										Certifications	Album
Title	Year	US	US Pop	US Latin Dig.	AUT	BEL (WA) Tip	CAN	GER	MEX Ing.	SCO	UK	Certifications	Album
"Til I Forget About You"	2010	— (Note: "Til I Forget About You" did not enter the Billboard Hot 100, but peaked at number 12 on the Bubbling Under Hot 100 chart.)	—	—	—	—	2	—	—	—	—	RIAA: Gold	BTR
"Boyfriend" (featuring Snoop Dogg or New Boyz)	2011	72	32	—	55	36	—	49	33	83	76	RIAA: Platinum; RMNZ: Gold	BTR
"Worldwide"	2011	—	—	—	—	—	—	81	—	—	—	RIAA: Gold	BTR
"Music Sounds Better with U" (featuring Mann)	2011	—	26	—	—	—	—	—	—	—	—		Elevate
"Windows Down"	2012	97	35	—	—	26	—	—	—	—	—	RIAA: Gold	Elevate
"Call It Like I See It"	2021	—	—	—	—	—	—	—	—	—	—		Non-album singles
"Not Giving You Up"	2022	—	—	—	—	—	—	—	—	—	—		Non-album singles
"Fall"	2022	—	—	—	—	—	—	—	—	—	—		Non-album singles
"Honey"	2022	—	—	—	—	—	—	—	—	—	—		Non-album singles
"Dale Pa'Ya" (with Maffio or Gente de Zona)	2022	—	—	5	—	—	—	—	—	—	—		Non-album singles
"Paralyzed" (Note: Re-record of the bonus track from Elevate (2011).)	2022	— (Note: "Paralyzed" did not enter the Billboard Hot 100, but peaked at number 30 on the Digital Song Sales chart.)	—	—	—	—	—	—	—	—	—		Non-album singles
"Can't Get Enough"	2023	—	—	—	—	—	—	—	—	—	—		Another Life
"Waves"	2023	—	—	—	—	—	—	—	—	—	—		Another Life
"Suave" (with Maffio and Calacote)	2023	—	—	21	—	—	—	—	—	—	—		Non-album single
"Weekends"	2023	—	—	—	—	—	—	—	—	—	—		Another Life
"Only One"	2024	—	—	—	—	—	—	—	—	—	—		Non-album singles
"I Want You Here All the Time"	2025	—	—	—	—	—	—	—	—	—	—		Non-album singles
"—" denotes releases that did not chart or were not released in that territory.

=== Promotional singles ===
List of promotional singles, with selected chart positions, showing year released and album name
Title	Year	Peak chart positions			Sales	Certifications	Album
Title	Year	US	US Kid	US Pop Dig.	Sales	Certifications	Album
"Big Time Rush"	2009	— (Note: "Big Time Rush" did not enter the Billboard Hot 100, but peaked at number 16 on the Bubbling Under Hot 100 chart.)	7	40	US: 215,000 (Note: Sales of "Big Time Rush" and "Any Kind of Guy" in the United States as of April 24, 2010.)	RIAA: Gold	BTR
"Any Kind of Guy"	2010	— (Note: "Any Kind of Guy" did not enter the Billboard Hot 100, but peaked at number 24 on the Bubbling Under Hot 100 chart.)	15	39	US: 94,000	RIAA: Gold	BTR
"Halfway There"	2010	93	5	28		RIAA: Gold	BTR
"Famous"	2010	— (Note: "Famous" did not enter the Billboard Hot 100, but peaked at number 19 on the Bubbling Under Hot 100 chart.)	12	42			BTR
"City Is Ours"	2010	— (Note: "City Is Ours" did not enter the Billboard Hot 100, but peaked at number five on the Bubbling Under Hot 100 chart.)	4	30			BTR
"If I Ruled the World" (featuring Iyaz)	2011	— (Note: "If I Ruled the World" did not enter the Billboard Hot 100, but peaked at number six on the Bubbling Under Hot 100 chart.)	1	37			Elevate
"Elevate"	2012	—	3	—			Elevate
"Like Nobody's Around"	2013	—	1	45			24/Seven
"—" denotes releases that did not chart or were not released in that territory.

== Other charted songs ==
List of other charted songs, with selected chart positions, showing year released and album name
Title	Year	Peak chart positions				Sales	Album
Title	Year	US	US Hol. Dig.	US Kid	US Pop Dig.	Sales	Album
"Nothing Even Matters"	2010	—	—	10	—		BTR
"Big Night"	2010	79	—	1	31	US: 46,000 (Note: Sales of "Big Night" in the United States as of January 6, 2011.)	BTR
"Oh Yeah"	2010	—	—	5	—		BTR
"Count on You" (featuring Jordin Sparks)	2010	—	—	4	—		BTR
"I Know You Know" (featuring Cymphonique)	2010	—	—	13	—		BTR
"All I Want for Christmas"	2010	— (Note: "All I Want for Christmas" did not enter the Billboard Hot 100, but peaked at number 24 on the Bubbling Under Hot 100 chart.)	3	1	44		Holiday Bundle
"Beautiful Christmas"	2010	—	7	2	—		Holiday Bundle
"No Idea"	2011	—	—	4	—		Elevate
"Love Me Love Me"	2011	—	—	17	—		Elevate
"Time of Our Life"	2011	—	—	21	—		Elevate
"Superstar"	2011	—	—	2	—		Elevate
"Help!"	2012	—	—	9	—	US: 3,000 (Note: Sales of "Help!" in the United States as of March 24, 2012.)	Big Time Movie Soundtrack
"We Can Work It Out"	2012	—	—	13	—		Big Time Movie Soundtrack
"24/Seven"	2013	—	—	1	—		24/Seven
"Song for You" (featuring Karmin)	2013	—	—	10	—		24/Seven
"Crazy for U"	2013	—	—	15	—		24/Seven
"Picture This"	2013	—	—	12	—		24/Seven
"Confetti Falling"	2013	—	—	4	—		24/Seven
"We Are"	2013	—	—	10	—		24/Seven
"Love Me Again"	2013	—	—	13	—		24/Seven
"Lost in Love" (featuring Jake Miller)	2013	—	—	14	—		24/Seven
"Just Getting Started"	2013	—	—	24	—		24/Seven
"Na Na Na"	2013	—	—	21	—		24/Seven
"The Rush" (Lil Uzi Vert featuring Big Time Rush)	2024	— (Note: "The Rush" did not enter the Billboard Hot 100, but peaked at number 11 on the Bubbling Under Hot 100 chart.)	—	*			Eternal Atake 2
"—" denotes items which did not chart in that country. "*" denotes the chart is discontinued.

== Music videos ==
List of music videos, showing year released and directors
Title	Year	Director(s)	Ref.
"Big Time Rush"	2010	Petro	
"Any Kind of Guy"	2010	Ryan McNeill	
"Halfway There"	2010	Petro	
"Famous"	2010	Scott Fellows	
"City Is Ours"	2010	Petro	
"Til I Forget About You"	2010	Isaac Rentz	
"Stuck"	2010	Marcus Wagner	
"Big Night"	2010	Ed Cardenas	
"Boyfriend"	2011	Petro	
"Worldwide"	2011	Scott Fellows	
"Music Sounds Better with U"	2011	Marc Klasfeld and Marcus Wagner	
"Time of Our Life"	2012	Savage Steve Holland	
"Elevate"	2012	Shawn Corrigan	
"Windows Down"	2012	Marc Klasfeld	
"24/Seven"	2013	Shawn Corrigan	
"Like Nobody's Around"	2013	Savage Steve Holland	
"Confetti Falling"	2013	Savage Steve Holland	
"We Are"	2013	Savage Steve Holland	
"Not Giving You Up"	2022	Erik Rojas	
"Fall"	2022	Aaron Gatewood	
"Honey"	2022	Kerry Henderson	
"Paralyzed"	2022	Aaron Gatewood, Kerry Henderson	
"Can't Get Enough"	2023	Aaron Gatewood	
"Waves"	2023	Jade Ehlers	
"Weekends"	2023	Michael B. Chait	
