= Forever Tour =

2022–23 concert tour by Big Time Rush

- Tour by Big Time Rush
- Promotional poster for the tour
- Location: North America; South America
- Start date: June 23, 2022
- End date: March 5, 2023
- Legs: 2
- No. of shows: 50
- Supporting acts: Dixie D'Amelio; Sergyo; Spencer Sutherland; Yami Sadfie

Big Time Rush concert chronology
- Live World Tour (2014); Forever Tour (2022–23); Can't Get Enough Tour (2023)

The Forever Tour was the sixth headlining concert tour by American boy band, Big Time Rush. The tour began on June 23, 2022, in Oxon Hill, MD, and ended on March 5, 2023 in Rio de Janeiro, Brazil. The band announced the tour and its dates on February 21, 2022, with ticket presales starting on February 23. On March 8, 2022, it was confirmed that the band would be traveling all around the world in an announcement of three new shows in Mexico. The three newly added shows sold out in less than a day.

== Setlist ==
1. "Windows Down"
2. "Music Sounds Better with U"
3. "Honey"
4. "Love Me Again (demo version)"
5. "Any Kind of Guy"
6. "Amazing"
7. "Call It Like I See It"
8. "Dale Pa'Ya"
9. "Show Me"
10. "Not Giving You Up"
11. "Halfway There"
12. "Stuck"
13. "No Idea"
14. "Confetti Falling"
15. "I Know You Know"
16. "Worldwide"
17. "Time of Our Life"
18. "Paralyzed"
19. "Fall"
20. "City Is Ours"
21. "Big Night"
22. "Til I Forget About You"
23. "Nothing Even Matters"
24. "If I Ruled the World"
25. "Big Time Rush"
26. "Boyfriend"

=== Notes ===
- Before performing "I Know You Know" at each show, Big Time Rush would perform a medley of different songs with Carlos on the ukulele. Some of the songs they would perform included a variety of covers including "As It Was" and "Watermelon Sugar", and original songs including "Na Na Na", "Cover Girl", and the "Giant Turd" song from Big Time Rush.
- During select dates, "Dale Pa'Ya" was performed in between "Call It Like I See It" and "Show Me". It was permanently added to the setlist starting with the show in Rogers, Arkansas.
- At the show in Philadelphia, PA, singer Rick Astley joined the band in a surprise appearance to cover his song "Never Gonna Give You Up".

== Shows ==
Date	City	Country	Venue	Opening Acts
North America
June 23, 2022	Oxon Hill	United States	The Theater at MGM National Harbor	Dixie D'Amelio
June 24, 2022	Bridgeport	United States	Hartford HealthCare Amphitheater	Dixie D'Amelio
June 25, 2022	Gilford	United States	Bank of New Hampshire Pavilion	Dixie D'Amelio
June 26, 2022	Boston	United States	Leader Bank Pavilion	Dixie D'Amelio
June 28, 2022	Philadelphia	United States	TD Pavilion	Dixie D'Amelio
June 30, 2022	New York	United States	Madison Square Garden	Dixie D'Amelio
July 1, 2022	Hershey	United States	Giant Center	Dixie D'Amelio
July 2, 2022	Darien	United States	Darien Lake Amphitheatre	Dixie D'Amelio
July 3, 2022	Atlantic City	United States	Boardwalk Hall	Dixie D'Amelio
July 6, 2022	Cincinnati	United States	Andrew J. Brady Music Center	Dixie D'Amelio
July 7, 2022	Chicago	United States	Huntington Bank Pavilion	Dixie D'Amelio
July 8, 2022	Cuyahoga Falls	United States	Blossom Music Center	Dixie D'Amelio
July 9, 2022	Pittsburgh	United States	Petersen Events Center	Dixie D'Amelio
July 10, 2022	Sterling Heights	United States	Michigan Lottery Amphitheatre	Dixie D'Amelio
July 12, 2022	Baltimore	United States	Pier Six Pavilion	Dixie D'Amelio
July 14, 2022	Franklin	United States	FirstBank Amphitheater	Dixie D'Amelio
July 15, 2022	Raleigh	United States	Red Hat Amphitheater	Dixie D'Amelio
July 16, 2022	Charlotte	United States	Skyla Credit Union Amphitheatre	Dixie D'Amelio
July 19, 2022	Jacksonville	United States	Daily's Place	Dixie D'Amelio
July 21, 2022	Tampa	United States	MidFlorida Credit Union Amphitheatre	Dixie D'Amelio
July 22, 2022	Miami	United States	Bayfront Park Amphitheater	Dixie D'Amelio
July 23, 2022	Orlando	United States	Addition Financial Arena	Dixie D'Amelio
July 24, 2022	Atlanta	United States	Cadence Bank Amphitheatre	Dixie D'Amelio
July 26, 2022	Indianapolis	United States	TCU Amphitheater	Spencer Sutherland
July 28, 2022	Minneapolis	United States	The Armory	Spencer Sutherland
July 30, 2022	Kansas City	United States	T-Mobile Center	Spencer Sutherland
July 31, 2022	Maryland Heights	United States	Hollywood Casino Amphitheatre	Spencer Sutherland
August 2, 2022	Rogers	United States	Walmart Arkansas Music Pavilion	Spencer Sutherland
August 3, 2022	Irving	United States	The Pavilion at Toyota Music Factory	Spencer Sutherland
August 4, 2022	Austin	United States	Moody Amphitheater	Spencer Sutherland
August 5, 2022	Sugar Land	United States	Smart Financial Centre	Spencer Sutherland
August 6, 2022	Hidalgo	United States	Payne Arena	Spencer Sutherland
August 8, 2022	El Paso	United States	Don Haskins Center	Spencer Sutherland
August 10, 2022	Inglewood	United States	YouTube Theater	Spencer Sutherland
August 11, 2022	Irvine	United States	FivePoint Amphitheatre	Spencer Sutherland
August 12, 2022	San Diego	United States	CalCoast Credit Union Open Air Theatre	Spencer Sutherland
August 13, 2022	Phoenix	United States	Arizona Financial Theatre	Spencer Sutherland
August 14, 2022	Albuquerque	United States	Isleta Amphitheater	Spencer Sutherland
August 16, 2022	Denver	United States	Levitt Pavilion	Spencer Sutherland
August 18, 2022	West Valley City	United States	USANA Amphitheatre	Spencer Sutherland
August 20, 2022	Concord	United States	Concord Pavilion	Spencer Sutherland
August 23, 2022	Zapopan	Mexico	Telmex Auditorium	—
August 24, 2022	Mexico City	Mexico	Palacio de los Deportes	—
August 26, 2022	Monterrey	Mexico	Auditorio Citibanamex	—
February 7, 2023	College Park	United States	University of Maryland	—
February 8, 2023	Columbus	United States	Newport Music Hall	—
February 10, 2023	Inglewood	United States	Kia Forum	—
South America
February 23, 2023	Santiago	Chile	Teatro Caupolicán	Sergyo
February 24, 2023	Santiago	Chile	Teatro Caupolicán	Sergyo
February 26, 2023	Buenos Aires	Argentina	Estadio Obras Sanitarias	Yami Sadfie
February 28, 2023	Bogotá	Colombia	Chamorro City Hall	—
March 3, 2023	São Paulo	Brazil	Espaço Unimed	—
March 5, 2023	Rio de Janeiro	Brazil	Vivo Rio	—

=== Cancelled ===
Date	City	Country	Venue
July 4, 2022	Toronto	Canada	Budweiser Stage
