= In Real Life Worldwide Tour =

2025 concert tour by Big Time Rush

- Tour by Big Time Rush
- Promotional poster for the tour
- Location: Asia; Europe; North America; Oceania; South America
- Start date: July 9, 2025
- End date: March 22, 2026
- Legs: 4
- No. of shows: 73
- Supporting acts: Katelyn Tarver; Stephen Kramer Glickman

Big Time Rush concert chronology
- Australia & Asia Tour (2024); In Real Life Worldwide Tour (2025–2026)

The In Real Life Worldwide Tour was the tenth concert tour by American pop music boy band Big Time Rush. The tour began in Birmingham, Alabama on July 9, 2025, and concluded in Melbourne, Australia on March 26, 2026.

== Background ==
Big Time Rush announced the 54-date tour on February 20, 2025. The tour is scheduled from July through December 2025 across North America and Europe with more dates to be announced. Tickets are going on sale on February 28, 2025, with various presales starting on February 25. On February 27, an extra Amsterdam date was added due to demand. On October 20, 2025, the group announced 15 additional dates in the United States in early 2026. The leg will travel through college towns. On January 2, 2026, it was announced that this portion of the tour would be cancelled due to "prolonged illness and injuries".

The tour was advertised as the group playing songs from every episode. Former co-stars of their show Big Time Rush, Katelyn Tarver, who played Jo, and Stephen Kramer Glickman, who played Gustavo, would serve as the supporting acts.

During a performance in Kraków, Poland, Singer Logan Henderson was injured on stage and taken to an area hospital for a gash on his knee, The band reassured fans onstage that he was ok and was getting checked out by medical professionals

BTR Addressing Fans On Logan's Condition

== Setlist ==
This setlist was taken from the show in Birmingham on July 9, 2025. It was the same setlist from all shows throughout the tour.

Act I

1. "Big Time Rush"
2. "Windows Down"
3. "Amazing"
4. "Music Sounds Better"
5. "Superstar"
6. "Picture This"
7. "Shot in the Dark" / "Big Night"
8. "Like Nobody's Around"
9. "Cover Girl"
10. "You're Not Alone"
11. "All Over Again"
12. "We Are"
13. "Giant Turd"
14. "Stuck"
15. "Famous" / "Oh Yeah"
16. "Any Kind of Guy"
17. "This Is Our Someday"
18. "Paralyzed"
19. "City Is Ours"

B Stage

19. "Halfway There"
20. "Crazy for U"
21. "Untouchable"
22. "Count On You"

Act II

23. "No Idea"
24. "Worldwide"
25. "Elevate"
26. "Blow Your Speakers"
27. "Run Wild"
28. "Love Me Love Me"

Act III

29. "Invisible" / "Time of Our Life" (recording)
30. "Nothing Even Matters"
31. "Song for You"
32. "I Know You Know"
33. "If I Ruled the World"
34. "Confetti Falling"

Encore

35. "Til I Forget About You"
36. "Boyfriend"

== Tour dates ==
List of 2025 concerts, showing date, city, country, venue, and supporting acts
| Date (2025) | City | Country | Venue | Support act(s) |
|---|---|---|---|---|
| July 9 | Birmingham | United States | Coca-Cola Amphitheater | Katelyn Tarver; Stephen Kramer Glickman |
| July 11 | Nashville | United States | Ascend Amphitheater | Katelyn Tarver; Stephen Kramer Glickman |
| July 12 | Alpharetta | United States | Ameris Bank Amphitheatre | Katelyn Tarver; Stephen Kramer Glickman |
| July 13 | Tampa | United States | MidFlorida Credit Union Amphitheatre | Katelyn Tarver; Stephen Kramer Glickman |
| July 15 | Jacksonville | United States | Daily's Place | Katelyn Tarver; Stephen Kramer Glickman |
| July 16 | Charlotte | United States | PNC Music Pavilion | Katelyn Tarver; Stephen Kramer Glickman |
| July 18 | Raleigh | United States | Coastal Credit Union Music Park | Katelyn Tarver; Stephen Kramer Glickman |
| July 19 | Virginia Beach | United States | Veterans United Home Loans Amphitheater | Katelyn Tarver; Stephen Kramer Glickman |
| July 20 | Bristow | United States | Jiffy Lube Live | Katelyn Tarver; Stephen Kramer Glickman |
| July 22 | Holmdel | United States | PNC Bank Arts Center | Katelyn Tarver; Stephen Kramer Glickman |
| July 23 | Wantagh | United States | Jones Beach Theater | Katelyn Tarver; Stephen Kramer Glickman |
| July 25 | Mansfield | United States | Xfinity Center | Katelyn Tarver; Stephen Kramer Glickman |
| July 26 | Uncasville | United States | Mohegan Sun Arena | Katelyn Tarver; Stephen Kramer Glickman |
| July 27 | Gilford | United States | BankNH Pavilion | Katelyn Tarver; Stephen Kramer Glickman |
| July 29 | Cuyahoga Falls | United States | Blossom Music Center | Katelyn Tarver; Stephen Kramer Glickman |
| July 30 | Cincinnati | United States | Riverbend Music Center | Katelyn Tarver; Stephen Kramer Glickman |
| August 1 | Hershey | United States | Hersheypark Stadium | Katelyn Tarver; Stephen Kramer Glickman |
| August 2 | Philadelphia | United States | TD Pavilion at the Mann | Katelyn Tarver; Stephen Kramer Glickman |
| August 3 | Saratoga Springs | United States | Broadview Stage | Katelyn Tarver; Stephen Kramer Glickman |
| August 5 | Darien Center | United States | Darien Lake Amphitheater | Katelyn Tarver; Stephen Kramer Glickman |
| August 6 | Clarkston | United States | Pine Knob Music Theatre | Katelyn Tarver; Stephen Kramer Glickman |
| August 8 | Saint Paul | United States | Xcel Energy Center | Katelyn Tarver; Stephen Kramer Glickman |
| August 9 | Milwaukee | United States | American Family Insurance Amphitheater | Katelyn Tarver; Stephen Kramer Glickman |
| August 10 | Tinley Park | United States | Credit Union 1 Amphitheatre | Katelyn Tarver; Stephen Kramer Glickman |
| August 12 | Noblesville | United States | Ruoff Music Center | Katelyn Tarver; Stephen Kramer Glickman |
| August 13 | Kansas City | United States | Starlight Theatre | Katelyn Tarver; Stephen Kramer Glickman |
| August 15 | Rogers | United States | Walmart Arkansas Music Pavilion | Katelyn Tarver; Stephen Kramer Glickman |
| August 16 | Dallas | United States | Dos Equis Pavilion | Katelyn Tarver; Stephen Kramer Glickman |
| August 17 | The Woodlands | United States | Cynthia Woods Mitchell Pavilion | Katelyn Tarver; Stephen Kramer Glickman |
| August 19 | Austin | United States | Moody Center | Katelyn Tarver; Stephen Kramer Glickman |
| August 20 | Oklahoma City | United States | Zoo Amphitheatre | Katelyn Tarver; Stephen Kramer Glickman |
| August 22 | Albuquerque | United States | Isleta Amphitheater | Katelyn Tarver; Stephen Kramer Glickman |
| August 23 | Phoenix | United States | Talking Stick Resort Amphitheatre | Katelyn Tarver; Stephen Kramer Glickman |
| August 24 | Chula Vista | United States | North Island Credit Union Amphitheatre | Katelyn Tarver; Stephen Kramer Glickman |
| August 26 | Inglewood | United States | Intuit Dome | Katelyn Tarver; Stephen Kramer Glickman |
| August 27 | Concord | United States | Toyota Pavilion at Concord | Katelyn Tarver; Stephen Kramer Glickman |
| August 29 | West Valley City | United States | Utah First Credit Union Amphitheatre | Katelyn Tarver; Stephen Kramer Glickman |
| August 30 | Paradise | United States | PH Live | Katelyn Tarver; Stephen Kramer Glickman |
| November 14 | Vienna | Austria | Wiener Stadthalle | Katelyn Tarver; Stephen Kramer Glickman |
| November 17 | Cologne | Germany | Lanxess Arena | Katelyn Tarver; Stephen Kramer Glickman |
| November 18 | Hamburg | Germany | Barclays Arena | Katelyn Tarver; Stephen Kramer Glickman |
| November 20 | Kraków | Poland | Tauron Arena | Katelyn Tarver; Stephen Kramer Glickman |
| November 22 | Prague | Czech Republic | Sportovní hala Fortuna | Katelyn Tarver; Stephen Kramer Glickman |
| November 23 | Berlin | Germany | Uber Arena | Katelyn Tarver; Stephen Kramer Glickman |
| November 24 | Munich | Germany | Olympiahalle | Katelyn Tarver; Stephen Kramer Glickman |
| November 26 | Assago | Italy | Unipol Forum | Katelyn Tarver; Stephen Kramer Glickman |
| November 27 | Zürich | Switzerland | Hallenstadion | Katelyn Tarver; Stephen Kramer Glickman |
| November 29 | Barcelona | Spain | Sant Jordi Club | Katelyn Tarver; Stephen Kramer Glickman |
| November 30 | Madrid | Spain | Palacio Vistalegre | Katelyn Tarver; Stephen Kramer Glickman |
| December 3 | Paris | France | Zénith Paris | Katelyn Tarver; Stephen Kramer Glickman |
| December 5 | Brussels | Belgium | Forest National | Katelyn Tarver; Stephen Kramer Glickman |
| December 8 | Amsterdam | Netherlands | Ziggo Dome | Katelyn Tarver; Stephen Kramer Glickman |
| December 9 | Amsterdam | Netherlands | Ziggo Dome | Katelyn Tarver; Stephen Kramer Glickman |
| December 11 | London | England | OVO Arena Wembley | Katelyn Tarver; Stephen Kramer Glickman |
| December 14 | Athens | Greece | OAKA Basketball Arena | Katelyn Tarver; Stephen Kramer Glickman |
| December 16 | Budapest | Hungary | MVM Dome | Katelyn Tarver; Stephen Kramer Glickman |
| December 18 | Zürich | Switzerland | Hallenstadion | Katelyn Tarver; Stephen Kramer Glickman |
| December 20 | Mannheim | Germany | SAP Arena | Katelyn Tarver; Stephen Kramer Glickman |
| December 22 | Copenhagen | Denmark | Royal Arena | Katelyn Tarver; Stephen Kramer Glickman |

List of 2026 concerts, showing date, city, country, venue, and supporting acts
| Date (2026) | City | Country | Venue | Support act(s) |
|---|---|---|---|---|
| February 17 | Zapopan | Mexico | Telmex Auditorium | Katelyn Tarver; Stephen Kramer Glickman |
| February 19 | Monterrey | Mexico | Auditorio Banamex | Katelyn Tarver; Stephen Kramer Glickman |
| February 20 | Heroica Puebla de Zaragoza | Mexico | Auditorio GNP Seguros | Katelyn Tarver; Stephen Kramer Glickman |
| February 21 | Mexico City | Mexico | Palacio de los Deportes | Katelyn Tarver; Stephen Kramer Glickman |
| February 22 | Mérida | Mexico | Foro GNP Seguros | Katelyn Tarver; Stephen Kramer Glickman |
| February 24 | Bogotá | Colombia | Movistar Arena | Katelyn Tarver; Stephen Kramer Glickman |
| February 26 | San Miguel | Peru | Costa 21 Multiespacio | Katelyn Tarver; Stephen Kramer Glickman |
| February 27 | San Miguel | Peru | Costa 21 Multiespacio | Katelyn Tarver; Stephen Kramer Glickman |
| March 1 | Santiago | Chile | Movistar Arena | Katelyn Tarver; Stephen Kramer Glickman |
| March 3 | Buenos Aires | Argentina | Movistar Arena | Katelyn Tarver; Stephen Kramer Glickman |
| March 6 | São Paulo | Brazil | Espaço Unimed | Katelyn Tarver; Stephen Kramer Glickman |
| March 13 | Honolulu | United States | Waikiki Shell | Katelyn Tarver; Stephen Kramer Glickman |
| March 17 | Sydney | Australia | International Convention Centre Sydney | Katelyn Tarver; Stephen Kramer Glickman |
| March 20 | Brisbane | Australia | Riverstage | Katelyn Tarver; Stephen Kramer Glickman |
| March 22 | Melbourne | Australia | Margaret Court Arena | Katelyn Tarver; Stephen Kramer Glickman |

=== Cancelled dates ===
| Date (2026) | City | Country | Venue | Reason |
|---|---|---|---|---|
| January 24 | Champaign | United States | State Farm Center | Doctors orders and prolonged illness |
| January 25 | Columbus | United States | Schottenstein Center | Doctors orders and prolonged illness |
| January 26 | Charlottesville | United States | John Paul Jones Arena | Doctors orders and prolonged illness |
| January 28 | Boston | United States | MGM Music Hall at Fenway | Doctors orders and prolonged illness |
| January 30 | Pittsburgh | United States | Petersen Events Center | Doctors orders and prolonged illness |
| January 31 | Syracuse | United States | Upstate Medical University Arena | Doctors orders and prolonged illness |
| February 2 | Lexington | United States | Rupp Arena | Doctors orders and prolonged illness |
| February 3 | State College | United States | Bryce Jordan Center | Doctors orders and prolonged illness |
| February 5 | Knoxville | United States | Thompson-Boling Arena | Doctors orders and prolonged illness |
| February 6 | Columbia | United States | Colonial Life Arena | Doctors orders and prolonged illness |
| February 7 | Orlando | United States | Addition Financial Arena | Doctors orders and prolonged illness |
| February 9 | Tallahassee | United States | Donald L. Tucker Civic Center | Doctors orders and prolonged illness |
| February 10 | Baton Rouge | United States | Raising Cane's River Center Arena | Doctors orders and prolonged illness |
| February 12 | Madison | United States | Kohl Center | Doctors orders and prolonged illness |
| February 13 | Lincoln | United States | Pinnacle Bank Arena | Doctors orders and prolonged illness |
| March 26 | Dubai | United Arab Emirates | Coca-Cola Arena | Due to unforeseen circumstances |
| March 30 | Tokyo | Japan | Toyosu Pit | Due to unforeseen circumstances |
