= Big Time Rush in Concert =

2011 concert tour by Big Time Rush

- Tour by Big Time Rush
- Promotional poster for the tour
- Associated album: BTR
- Start date: April 19, 2011
- End date: December 13, 2011
- Legs: 4
- No. of shows: 4 in Europe; 47 in North America; 51 in total

Big Time Rush concert chronology
- Big Time Rush in Concert (2011); Better with U Tour (2012)

Big Time Rush in Concert was the debut concert tour by American boy band, Big Time Rush. Visiting the U.S., Germany, and the U.K., the tour supported their debut album, BTR. The majority of the tour performed at several radio festivals, state fairs and amusement parks with about 20,000 spectators. The trek began in April 2011, and ended in December.

== Critical reception ==
The tour received positive praise from music critics. Many commented on their energetic performance and interaction with fans. At the Stanislaus County Fair, Deke Farrow (The Modesto Bee) writes it was the largest concert crowd at the fair. He goes on to say, "And outside the stage area, where there was no way they could see the band, little girls on their dads' shoulders looked just as thrilled as if they were in the front row. Experiencing a big-time rush indeed".

John J. Moser (The Morning Call) states the show at The Great Allentown Fair was filled with energy sensitivity, fantasy, connectivity, musicality and brevity. He continues, "It was refreshing that in an age where lip-synching is readily accepted, the members of Big Time Rush really sang, taking turns on lead vocals. They all were competent, and even pleasant, singers". At the Allegan County Fair, Kelle Barr (Kalamazoo Gazette) noted the shows was crowd pleasing for fans and their parents. She also says, "With sharp looks, smooth harmonies and melodies — let alone their electric, synchronized dancing — BTR may be the resurrection of the boy band. Just maybe".

Cathalena E. Burch (Arizona Daily Star) gave high praise of the show at the Arizona State Fair. During the show, she expressed how the concrete shook from the thousands of screaming girls. She further comments, "Their stage show is choreographed to the most minor details, from the infectious, cardio-pumping dance moves to inviting an audience member to join them in their acoustic set. Even the adults in the audience, the parents taking their young kids to their first-ever concert, were bopping and fist pumping, singing along without missing a word".

== Opening acts ==
- Days Difference (North America, select dates)
- Hot Chelle Rae (North America, select dates)
- New Hollow (Eureka, Fairlea and New Albany)
- Greyson Chance (New Albany)

== Setlist ==
1. Untitled I (instrumental introduction; contains elements of "We Will Rock You")
2. "Famous"
3. "Big Time Rush"
4. "Til I Forget About You"
5. "Big Night"
6. "Stuck"
7. "I Want to Hold Your Hand"
8. "Worldwide"
9. Untitled II (video interlude)
10. "Nothing Even Matters"
11. "If I Ruled the World"
12. "Any Kind of Guy"
13. "Boyfriend"
14. "City Is Ours"

Encore

15. "Halfway There"

== Tour dates ==
Date (2011)	City	Country	Venue	Attendance	Revenue
Europe
April 19	London	England	O_{2} Shepherd's Bush Empire	—N/a	
April 21	Munich	Germany	Hansa 39	—N/a	
North America
May 14 (Note: This concert was a part of Universal Orlando Summer Concert Series.)	Orlando	United States	Universal Music Plaza Stage	—N/a	
May 21 (Note: This concert was a part of the Kiss Concert.)	Mansfield	United States	Comcast Center	—N/a	
May 22 (Note: This concert was a part of the Summer Kick Off Concert.)	Agawam	United States	River's Edge Picnic Grove	—N/a	
June 4 (Note: This concert was a part of Summer Jam.)	Saratoga Springs	United States	Saratoga Performing Arts Center	—N/a	
June 5 (Note: This concert was a part of KFEST.)	Wappingers Falls	United States	Dutchess Stadium	—N/a	
June 25	Tulsa	United States	Big Splash	—N/a	
July 1 (Note: This concert was a part of the San Diego County Fair.)	Del Mar	United States	Heineken Grandstand Stage	—N/a	
Europe
July 7	Cologne	Germany	E-Werk	—N/a	
July 8	Manchester	England	Manchester Academy	—N/a	
North America
July 19 (Note: This concert was a part of the Jackson County Fair.)	Central Point	United States	Lithia Motors Amphitheater	—N/a	
July 20 (Note: This concert was a part of the Stanislaus County Fair.)	Turlock	United States	Budweiser Variety Free Stage	—N/a	
July 22 (Note: This concert was a part of the Orange County Fair.)	Costa Mesa	United States	Pacific Amphitheatre	—N/a	
July 23 (Note: This concert was a part of Red, White & Boom!)	Kansas City	United States	Heart of America Theatre	—N/a	
July 24 (Note: This concert was a part of the Wilmington Trust Grandstand Concert Series.)	Harrington	United States	Wilmington Trust Grandstand	—N/a	
July 31 (Note: This concert was a part of Elitch Gardens Summer Concert Series.)	Denver	United States	Elitch Arena	—N/a	
August 2 (Note: These concerts were a part of the Starburst Summer Concert Series.)	Eureka	United States	Old Glory Amphitheatre	—N/a	
August 3 (Note: This concert was a part of the Ohio State Fair.)	Columbus	United States	Celeste Center	—N/a	
August 5 (Note: This concert was a part of the Clearfield County Fair.)	Clearfield	United States	Clearfield Grandstand	—N/a	
August 6 (Note: This concert was a part of the Wisconsin State Fair.)	West Allis	United States	State Fair Main Stage	—N/a	
August 7 (Note: This concert was a part of the Lizard Fair.)	Midland	United States	Dow Diamond	—N/a	
August 10 (Note: This concert was a part of the Erie County Fair.)	Hamburg	United States	Buffalo.com Grandstand	—N/a	
August 11 (Note: This concert was a part of the Indiana State Fair.)	Indianapolis	United States	Hoosier Lottery Grandstand	—N/a	
August 12 (Note: This concert was a part of Concert for a Cause.)	Peru	United States	Illinois Valley Regional Airport	—N/a	
August 14 (Note: This concert was a part of the State Fair of West Virginia.)	Fairlea	United States	State Fair of West Virginia Grandstand	—N/a	
August 20 (Note: This concert was a part of Beatstock.)	Farmingville	United States	Brookhaven Amphitheater	—N/a	
August 21 (Note: This concert was a part of the Allen County Fair.)	Lima	United States	Infield Grandstand	—N/a	
August 27 (Note: This concert was a part of the Minnesota State Fair.)	Falcon Heights	United States	Minnesota State Fair Grandstand	—N/a	
August 28 (Note: This concert was a part of the Champlain Valley Fair.)	Essex	United States	Champlain Valley Expo Grandstand	—N/a	
August 30	Boston	United States	House of Blues	—N/a	
August 31	Hampton Beach	United States	Hampton Beach Casino Ballroom	—N/a	
September 1 (Note: This concert was a part of the Great New York State Fair.)	Geddes	United States	Chevy Court	—N/a	
September 3	Jackson Township	United States	Northern Star Arena	—N/a	
September 4 (Note: This concert was a part of the Great Allentown Fair.)	Allentown	United States	Allentown Fairgrounds Grandstand	—N/a	
September 10 (Note: This concert was a part of the York Fair)	York	United States	Toyota Grandstand	—N/a	
September 11 (Note: This concert was a part of the Allegan County Fair.)	Allegan	United States	Allegan County Fair Grandstand	—N/a	
September 17 (Note: This concert was a part of the Clay County Fair.)	Spencer	United States	U.S. Cellular Grandstand	—N/a	
September 18 (Note: This concert was a part of the Kansas State Fair.)	Hutchinson	United States	U.S. Cellular Grandstand	—N/a	
September 25 (Note: This concert was a part of the New Albany Classic Invitational Grand Prix and Family Day.)	New Albany	United States	Wexner Estate	—N/a	
October 8 (Note: This concert was a part of the Big Fresno Fair.)	Fresno	United States	Paul Paul Theatre	—N/a	
November 5 (Note: This concert was a part of the Arizona State Fair.)	Phoenix	United States	Arizona Veterans Memorial Coliseum	—N/a	
November 30 (Note: These concerts were a part of Jingle Ball.)	Rochester	United States	Blue Cross Arena	—N/a	
December 3	Los Angeles	United States	Nokia Theatre L.A. Live	—N/a	
December 4	Minneapolis	United States	Target Center	—N/a	
December 6 (Note: This concert was a part of the Kissmas Bash.)	Buffalo	United States	First Niagara Center	—N/a	
December 7	Philadelphia	United States	Wells Fargo Center	—N/a	
December 9	New York City	United States	Madison Square Garden	—N/a	
December 10 (Note: This concert was a part of Let It Show.)	Scranton	United States	SCC Grand Ballroom	—N/a	
December 11	Tampa	United States	St. Pete Times Forum	—N/a	
December 12	Hershey	United States	Giant Center	—N/a	
December 13 (Note: This concert was a part Jingle Jam.)	Duluth	United States	Arena at Gwinnett Center	5,283 / 6,181 (85%)	$230,236
