= Summer Break Tour =

2013 concert tour by Big Time Rush and Victoria Justice

- Tour by Big Time Rush and Victoria Justice
- Location: North America
- Associated album: 24/Seven; Victorious 3.0
- Start date: June 21, 2013
- End date: August 15, 2013
- Legs: 2
- No. of shows: 40
Big Time Rush tour chronology
Big Time Summer Tour (2012)	Summer Break Tour (2013)	Live World Tour (2014)
Victoria Justice tour chronology
Make It in America Tour (2012)	Summer Break Tour (2013)

The Summer Break Tour was a co-headlining concert tour by American boy band Big Time Rush and American singer Victoria Justice. This was Big Time Rush's fourth consecutive headlining tour, and Justice's second overall tour. The tour supported Big Time Rush's third studio album 24/Seven and Justice's music from the television show Victorious. The tour played 40 shows in North America.

== Background ==
The Summer Break Tour was originally meant to be headlined solely by Big Time Rush. Victoria Justice, on the other hand, had been set to embark on her own summer tour called Here's 2 Us Tour, which she described as "a farewell tour" for Victorious fans after the show's cancellation. Several individual shows from Justice's tour were cancelled throughout the month of March, and it was officially announced on March 29, 2013 that her solo tour had been cancelled in favor of a co-headlined tour with Big Time Rush.

== Opening acts ==
- Olivia Somerlyn
- Jackson Guthy
- G-Eazy (select dates)
- Kik-It (Gilford)

== Setlist ==
Big Time Rush
1. "Windows Down"
2. "24/Seven"
3. "Music Sounds Better with U"
4. "Run Wild"
5. "No Idea"
6. "Cover Girl"
7. "Get Up"
8. "Song for You"
9. "Untitled I" (Instrumental interlude)
10. "Crazy for U"
11. "Like Nobody's Around"
12. "Na Na Na"
13. "Big Night"
14. "Boyfriend"
15. "Untitled II" (Instrumental interlude)
16. "We Are"
17. "Amazing"
18. "Time of Our Life"
19. "Til I Forget About You"
20. "Elevate"
21. "Confetti Falling"

Encore

20. "Big Time Rush"
21. "City Is Ours"
Victoria Justice
1. "Freak the Freak Out"
2. "Beggin' on Your Knees"
3. "Cheer Me Up" (with Madison Grace Reed)
4. "Take a Hint"
5. "Shake"
6. "Girl Up" (Video Interlude)
7. "I Love It"
8. "Medley: "You're the Reason" / "Tell Me That You Love Me"
9. "Gold"
10. "Best Friend's Brother"
11. "Make It in America"

Encore

12. "Make It Shine"
13. "Here's 2 Us"

== Shows ==
Date (2013)	City	Country	Venue	Attendance	Revenue
June 21	Los Angeles	United States	Gibson Amphitheatre	—N/a	
June 22	Del Mar	United States	Heineken Grandstand Stage	—N/a	
June 23	Concord	United States	Sleep Train Pavilion	—N/a	
June 25	Phoenix	United States	Ak-Chin Pavilion	—N/a	
June 26	Tucson	United States	Anselmo Valencia Tori Amphitheater	—N/a	
June 28	The Woodlands	United States	Cynthia Woods Mitchell Pavilion	—N/a	
June 29	Dallas	United States	Gexa Energy Pavilion	—N/a	
June 30	Oklahoma City	United States	Chesapeake Energy Arena	—N/a	
July 2	Southaven	United States	Lander's Center	—N/a	
July 3	Atlanta	United States	Chastain Park Amphitheater	—N/a	
July 5	West Palm Beach	United States	Cruzan Amphitheatre	—N/a	
July 6	St. Augustine	United States	St. Augustine Amphitheatre	—N/a	
July 7	Raleigh	United States	Time Warner Cable Music Pavilion	—N/a	
July 9	Charlotte	United States	Verizon Wireless Amphitheatre	—N/a	
July 10	Bristow	United States	Jiffy Lube Live	—N/a	
July 12	Bethel	United States	Bethel Woods Center for the Arts	—N/a	
July 13	Holmdel Township	United States	PNC Bank Arts Center	—N/a	
July 14	Burgettstown	United States	First Niagara Pavilion	—N/a	
July 16	Camden	United States	Susquehanna Bank Center	—N/a	
July 18	Wantagh	United States	Nikon at Jones Beach Theater	—N/a	
July 19	Hershey	United States	Hersheypark Stadium	—N/a	
July 20	Uncasville	United States	Mohegan Sun Arena	3,257 / 5,167 (61%)	$146,565
July 21	Mansfield	United States	Comcast Center	—N/a	
July 23	Gilford	United States	Bank of New Hampshire Pavilion	3,382 / 6,540 (52%)	$164,634
July 24	Bangor	United States	Darling's Waterfront Pavilion	—N/a	
July 26	Baltimore	United States	Pier Six Concert Pavilion	—N/a	
July 27	Saratoga Springs	United States	Saratoga Performing Arts Center	—N/a	
July 28	Darien Lake	United States	Darien Lake Performing Arts Center	—N/a	
July 30	Toledo	United States	Toledo Zoo Amphitheatre	—N/a	
July 31	Cuyahoga Falls	United States	Blossom Music Center	—N/a	
August 2	Noblesville	United States	Klipsch Music Center	—N/a	
August 3	Clarkston	United States	DTE Energy Music Theatre	—N/a	
August 4	Tinley Park	United States	First Midwest Bank Amphitheatre	—N/a	
August 6	Columbus	United States	Value City Arena	—N/a	
August 7	Cincinnati	United States	U.S. Bank Arena	—N/a	
August 9	Sioux City	United States	Gateway Arena	—N/a	
August 10	Minneapolis	United States	Target Center	6,852 / 6,852 (100%)	$244,926
August 11	Milwaukee	United States	Riverside Theater	—N/a	
August 14	Mexico City	Mexico	Palacio de los Deportes	16,618 / 16,650 (99%)	$795,381
August 15	Monterrey	Mexico	Arena Monterrey	—N/a	
Total				30,109 / 35,209 (85%)	$1,351,506
