= Big Time Rush =

Big Time Rush may refer to:

- Big Time Rush (group), a boy band
  - BTR (album), the first album by the band
    - "Big Time Rush", a song from the album
  - Big Time Rush (TV series), a television series featuring the band
