= Live World Tour =

2014 concert tour by Big Time Rush

- Tour by Big Time Rush
- Associated album: 24/Seven
- Start date: February 7, 2014
- End date: February 23, 2014
- Legs: 1
- No. of shows: 6 in North America; 5 in South America; 11 in total

Big Time Rush concert chronology
- Summer Break Tour (2013); Live World Tour (2014); Forever Tour (2022–23)

Live World Tour was the fifth concert tour by American boy band, Big Time Rush. The tour was in support of Big Time Rush's third studio album 24/Seven, released in June 2013, and was the group's final tour during their original run before going on hiatus in the spring of 2014. The tour began on February 7, 2014 in Grand Prairie, Texas. Ticketing pre-sales for the shows started on December 10, 2013.

== Opening acts ==
- Olivia Somerlyn
- Valeria Gastaldi (Argentina)
- Dre (Ecuador)
- Shawn Mendes (North America)

== Shows ==
Date (2014)	City	Country	Venue	Attendance	Revenue
North America
February 7	Grand Prairie	United States	Verizon Theatre	—N/a	
February 8	Houston	United States	Revention Music Center	—N/a	
February 9	San Antonio	United States	AT&T Center	—N/a	
February 11	Mexico City	Mexico	Mexico City Arena	—N/a	
February 12	Zapopan	Mexico	Auditorio Telmex	—N/a	
February 13	Monterrey	Mexico	Arena Monterrey	—N/a	
South America
February 15	Santiago	Chile	Movistar Arena	—N/a	
February 16	Buenos Aires	Argentina	Estadio Cubierto Malvinas Argentinas	6,157 / 7,500 (82%)	$274,925
February 19	Quito	Ecuador	Ágora de la Casa de la Cultura	—N/a	
February 22	Bogotá	Colombia	Simón Bolívar Park	—N/a	
February 23	Guatemala City	Guatemala	Tikal Futura Expocenter	—N/a	
