= Monkey Quest =

2011 video game

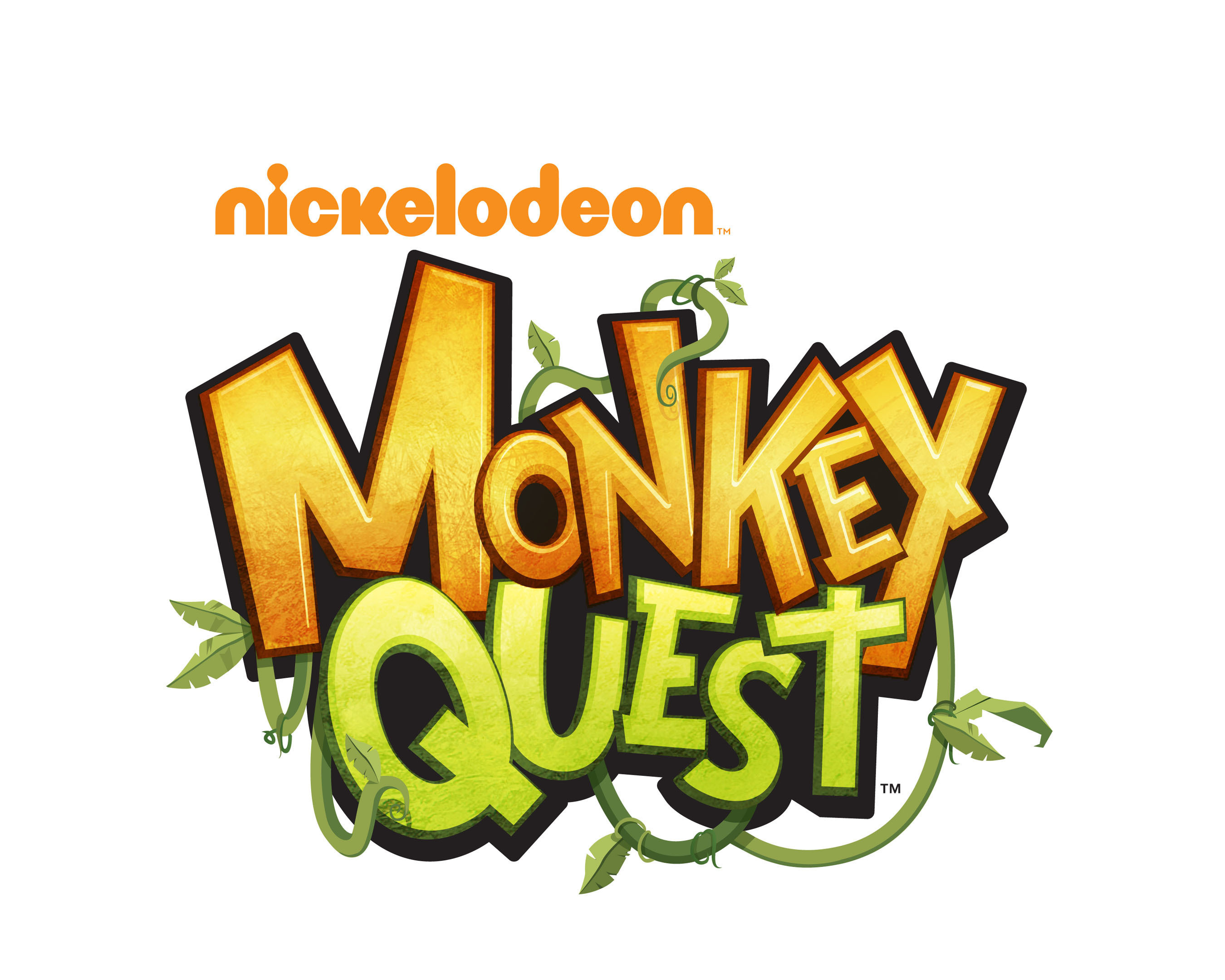
The official Monkey Quest logo

Monkey Quest was a massively multiplayer online game developed by Behavior Interactive and published by Nickelodeon. Preceded by a closed beta on December 14, 2010, it was officially released worldwide on March 17, 2011.

Nickelodeon described the game as having an "online experience that has the look and feel of a console game mixed with cooperative play". It was first revealed at the 2011 Game Developers Conference before its release later that year at the 2011 Kids' Choice Awards. Followed by subsequent updates throughout its four-year life span, Monkey Quest ultimately closed on September 26, 2014, due to a "shifting focus towards other digital and mobile experiences". The app Monkey Quest: Thunderbow was also removed from the App Store on July 31, 2014.

As of July 2026, the game remains dormant in all official capacities.

== Story ==
The game took place in the land of Ook. The Monkey King was dying, and players needed to explore the world and find a way to cure him. Throughout the world, players would encounter many inhabitants and complete many quests. They could meet friends, buy or unlock new objects, and battle monsters. As the user played, their monkey unlocked more lands, discovered more about the legendary Monkey King, and could even become the leader of a tribe.

== Tribes ==
Players could choose to join one of four monkey tribes:

- The Chim Foo
- The Sea Dragons
- The Ootu Mystics
- The Ice Raiders

There were also in-game locations and non-player characters associated with a fifth tribe, the Mek-Tek. However, the game was shut down before the option to join the Mek-Tek could be added.

== Quests ==
There were a large number of quests available throughout the game. Main quests could only be done once by every player. As the player leveled up their character, main quests would become more difficult to complete.

=== Daily Quests ===
Daily Quests could be done once a day by any player, regardless of their current level.

=== Side Quests ===
Side Quests could be done in addition to the other quest types.

=== Multiplayer Quests ===
Quests that required 2 or more players. Most of these only required 2, but some required 3 players. A Pet could also act as a replacement or substitute for an extra player.

== Gameplay ==
=== Controls ===
To explore the worlds of Ook, players used the arrow keys on their keyboard to move, and the space bar to jump. Pressing the space bar then the down arrow whilst in midair made the character do a dive bomb towards the ground. The player could also press either the CTRL key or the X key on their keyboard while facing an in-game NPC to access new quests or obtain information about Ook and its residents. The game had five equippable hot keys (C, V, B, N, and M) to control weapons, potions, pets, and any other items players wished to access quickly.

=== Currency ===
There were two types of currency in Monkey Quest. The main type of currency was bananas, which were commonly earned from quests and could be used at a vendor to buy items. The other currency, NC (Nick Cash), could be bought with real money, or earned by leveling up. NC could be used to buy items from an in-game store called the NC Mall.

=== Membership ===
There were membership plans that allowed players to pay real life money for special features in the game. These included the ability to join any tribe, as well as access to all trails, a type of area only available to paid members.

== Possible film adaptation ==
In August 2012, Variety reported that Paramount Animation (a subsidiary of Viacom along with Nickelodeon) was in the process of starting development of several animated movies with budgets of around US$100 million. According to Variety, the intellectual property for these films, which is to be supplied by Nickelodeon among others, included Monkey Quest.

Since the film's announcement in 2012, no new information on the film has been shared, and the movie was likely cancelled alongside the game's closure.

== Closure ==
On August 14, 2014, Nickelodeon announced that after four years of operation, Monkey Quest would be shut down permanently on September 26. Subsequently, every player was given membership for the remaining time of the game. Players were offered refunds for their memberships if they contacted Nickelodeon within a given time before the game shut down. The website was also updated with a closing message on the index page. The Monkey Quest website did not close until January 30, 2016. The game remained open for a month after the announcement, finally closing on the set date, September 26, 2014. After the game's closure, its website was updated with a new FAQ to help with billing support and inform users about the game's closure. The game's site, monkeyquest.com, now redirects to Paramount+.

After the game's discontinuation, numerous attempts at resurrecting the game have been made. One of the more notable projects was named "Monkey Quest Reborn", a community-driven recreation of the original game. It was ultimately shut down by Paramount Global, Nickelodeon's parent company, for redistribution of content under the Digital Millennium Copyright Act. Attempted recreations of the game have still continued on, with active development being done by the community on creating open-source tools used to faithfully emulate the game's servers as they worked at the time of the shutdown - enabling play via a client that a user originally owned instead.
