= BTR (album) =

Studio album by Big Time Rush
- Released: October 11, 2010
- Recorded: 2009–2010
- Genres: Electropop; teen pop; R&B; dance-pop
- Length: 37:55
- Labels: Nickelodeon; Columbia/Epic
- Producers: Emanuel Kiriakou; Damon Sharpe; Lucas Secon; Matthew Gerrard; Kevin Rudolf; Edwin "Lil Eddie" Serrano; Jeremy Skaller; Robert Larow; Stuart Grekin; Christopher Rojas; The Messengers; Eric Sanicola; S*A*M and Sluggo; Timothy Foxx

Big Time Rush chronology
BTR (2010)	Elevate (2011)

Singles from BTR
- 1. "Til I Forget About You" Released: September 21, 2010; 2. "Boyfriend" Released: February 8, 2011; 3. "Worldwide" Released: July 23, 2011

BTR is the debut studio album by pop boy band Big Time Rush. Released on October 11, 2010, the track listing for the album was announced on September 1, 2010. The album was preceded by the release of several singles from the TV show soundtrack. On December 3, 2009, the band released their eponymous song as the album's promotional single. It was followed up by four more promotional singles: "Any Kind of Guy", "Halfway There", "Famous" and "City Is Ours".

The first single, "Til I Forget About You", was released on September 21, 2010. On February 8, 2011, "Boyfriend", which features vocals from rapper Snoop Dogg, was the second official single from the album and has become the band's biggest hit to date, charting at number seventy-two on the Billboard Hot 100, as well as reaching the Top 40 of the Pop Songs music chart in the US. The album's third single, "Worldwide", was released on July 23, 2011. Despite not being released as a single, the song "Big Night" charted on the Billboard Hot 100, peaking at number seventy-nine.

The album debuted at number three on the Billboard 200, selling 67,000 copies in the first week. It also reached number one on the US Soundtrack Albums chart and was certified Platinum by the Recording Industry Association of America. The group embarked on their first headlining tour, Big Time Rush in Concert, in April 2011, in support of the album.

== Background ==
BTR had been in the making since 2009, when the four members signed on for the show, Big Time Rush. The boys worked with composers and producers such as Emanuel Kiriakou, Lucas Secon, Matthew Gerrard, Kevin Rudolf, Edwin "Lil Eddie" Serrano, Jeremy Skaller, Robert Larow, Stuart Grekin, Chris Rojas, The Messengers, Eric Sanicola, S*A*M and Sluggo, Timothy Foxx, Jordan Delani and Scott Fellows (the creator of the group). Most of the music was pre-written for the band, however, they co-wrote "Oh Yeah", which Kendall Schmidt stated, "All the producers we work with have been extremely cool. I don't think we've come across anyone that hasn't let us have our input." While working on the album, the band released many of the songs as promotional singles onto iTunes, as well as debuted them on their television series. This provided great promotion for the band's music, and led to three hit songs, "Halfway There", "Boyfriend", "Big Night", to begin charting on the Billboard Hot 100.

As seen on their television series, the band worked with many well known celebrities, such as Jordin Sparks, who recorded a song with the boys titled "Count On You". When asked about the collaboration, James Maslow stated

Jordin is an unbelievable singer. If you hear her sing in real life, she sounds just as good live every time. She absolutely deserves to be where she is. She's so talented, and she's a sweetheart too. We're on the same label. She wanted to get into acting, so we wrote an episode about her. She came on and was a great actress. The song is one of our first group ballads. It's a five-way ballad, but it turned out pretty cool. Usually, a duet has one person on each side. This has her voice one side and then there are our four voices on the other [Laughs]. It worked out though. It was such a pleasure to have Jordin on the song. She became a good friend of mine. She took me to the actual show before she was in it last time [Laughs]. She's so down-to-earth like that.

On August 23, it was announced BTR would be released on October 11. On September 1, the album track listing for the standard version was released online. Most of the band's songs featured on the TV Show were included on the album, which also served as the soundtrack to the First Season and part of the Second Season of the series. The songs "Any Kind of Guy", and "Famous", the latter of which is a cover of the Play song, were included on the international release of the album, along with the songs "This Is Our Someday", and "Stuck" (the last one exclusively to the UK and in some iTunes stores around the world). The previously recorded track which featured Jordin Sparks was listed on the album, along with another duet with R&B artist Cymphonique.

The second track on the album, "Boyfriend", was originally recorded and released as a solo song; however, a version featuring rapper Snoop Dogg, who appeared in an episode of Big Time Rush with the band, was released on February 8, 2011. Another version of the song featured rap duo New Boyz. Both official versions were later included on the international releases of the album.

== Composition ==
The music found on the album is mainly pop oriented, as well as R&B. The music found on the album is child-appropriate, as it serves as not only their debut album, but the soundtrack to their self-titled series. Jessica Dawson of Common Sense Media said of the songs on the album, "Not since 'N Sync or the Backstreet Boys has there been a boy band making such a sudden splash in the tweenage music world. Big Time Rush is a standout, not only because of their boyish charm and good looks, but because their music is a cool blend of synth-pop, hip hop, and boy-band harmonies. 'City is Ours' is already a digital hit, and 'Count On You' with Jordin Sparks is a catchy collaboration about earning your place in a relationship. With a hit TV show to showcase their music and their adorable personalities, Big Time Rush won't be in a hurry out of the spotlight. Parents need to know that this boy band is making tween hearts swoon with their hit Nickelodeon TV show, Big Time Rush. In their debut album they sing about relationships, going out, and making the most of your life, but it's all clean and age-appropriate for young fans."

== Critical reception ==
Professional ratings
Review scores
Source	Rating
AllMusic	3/5 stars
Common Sense Media	3/5 stars
The Guardian	2/5 stars
OK! Magazine UK	3/5 stars

BTR was met with generally positive reception from critics. Matt Collar of AllMusic praised the album, stating "The self-titled debut album from the Nickelodeon boy band Big Time Rush features many of the dance-pop tunes popularized on the band's TV show of the same name. Showcasing the talents of singers Kendall Schmidt, James Maslow, Carlos Pena, Jr., and Logan Henderson, BTR is a fairly accessible listen that falls somewhere between the soulful alt-rock of OneRepublic and the electro-influenced pop of Katy Perry. These are catchy, sweet, radio and club-friendly tracks that, while aimed at "tweens," should appeal to most any fan of well-crafted dance-pop. To these ends, you get the synth-driven leadoff track "Til I Forget About You," the head-bobbin' "Boyfriend", and the yearning club anthem "Nothing Even Matters", among other highlights." Jessica Dawson of Common Sense Media said the album "is fine for tweens" and described the music as "clean and age-appropriate for young fans."

However, Caroline Sullivan of The Guardian was critical on the band's debut, stating how "horribly generic the music is." Despite feeling the album lacked originality, she complimented the song "Boyfriend" featuring Snoop Dogg, calling the track "wholesome-sounding." Alistair McGeorge gave a similar review, writing, "as an album, it establishes early on what it seeks to be, and does it well enough to ensure this will be a hit with its target audience. However, as a credible piece of music on its own merit, BTR falls a bit flat by virtue of its repetitive, slightly clichéd, nature."

== Commercial performance ==
In the United States, BTR sold 67,000 copies in the first week, debuting at number three on the Billboard 200 and easily became one of the highest charting debut albums of the year in 2010. The album stayed 57 weeks on the Billboard chart. As of 2012, the album has sold 700,000 copies in the U.S. It also charted in Mexico, on the Dutch Albums Chart, in Austria, Switzerland, Germany, the UK, Greece, Ireland, Italy, Portugal and Scottish album charts amongst others. The album received a platinum plaque by the Recording Industry Association of America (RIAA) for sales and streaming of 1,000,000 units.

== Promotion ==
To promote the album, Big Time Rush appeared on Today, where they performed their songs "Til I Forget About You" and "Big Night". The band performed at the Mall of America, performing the songs "Famous", "Til I Forget About You", "City Is Ours", "Big Time Rush" and "Big Night". The band also performed their single, "Boyfriend", at the 2011 Kids' Choice Awards. Rapper Snoop Dogg, who is featured on the single, appeared at the awards show to perform along with the band. In April 2011, the group embarked on their first headlining tour, Big Time Rush in Concert.

== Singles ==
"Til I Forget About You" was officially released as the lead single on September 21, 2010 and as a physical CD single on September 28, 2010 in the U.S., making it the first ever official commercialized single. The track list included the album version, and the B-side song "Famous". The song peaked at number 11 on the US Bubbling Under Hot 100 chart and was certified Gold by the Recording Industry Association of America. Additionally, the song reached number two in Canada.

"Boyfriend" was released as the second single on digital platforms on February 8, 2011, as well as mainstream radio on February 15. The single version features Snoop Dogg. Another version of the song was later released on April 19, which featured vocals from rapping duo New Boyz. "Boyfriend" peaked at seventy-two on the Billboard Hot 100, becoming their highest charting song to date. It also peaked at number 32 on the Billboard Mainstream Top 40 chart. The song was certified Platinum by the RIAA.

The third and final single, "Worldwide", was only released outside of North America as both a digital and physical single. The track list included the album version, and a remix of the song "Til I Forget About You" by Cash Cash. It was certified Gold by the RIAA.

=== Promotional singles ===
"Big Time Rush" was released on November 29, 2009, as the first promotional single to promote the airing of the new series. It debuted at number sixteen on the Bubbling Under Hot 100 singles chart. "Any Kind of Guy" was released on February 2, 2010, and peaked at number 24 on the US Bubbling Under Hot 100. "Halfway There" was released on April 27. The song debuted at number 93 on the Billboard Hot 100, their first entry on that chart. "Famous" was released on June 29. "City Is Ours" was released on August 3. "Big Time Rush" and "Any Kind of Guy" sold 215,000 and 94,000 copies respectively in the US as of 2010. Additionally, the first three promotional singles were certified Gold by the RIAA.

=== Other songs ===
"Big Night" peaked at number 79 on Billboard Hot 100 during the week of the album's release due to over 46,000 downloaded copies sold. "Nothing Even Matters", "Oh Yeah", "Count on You" and "I Know You Know" charted on the US Kid Digital Song Sales chart.

== Track listing ==
Standard edition
No.	Title	Writer(s)	Producer(s)	Length
1.	"Til I Forget About You"	Sam Hollander, Dave Katz, Claude Kelly	S*A*M and Sluggo	3:57
2.	"Boyfriend"	Lucas Secon, Wayne Hector, Francis Zamir	Secon	3:21
3.	"City Is Ours"	Eric Sanicola	Kevin Rudolf	3:12
4.	"Nothing Even Matters"	Jimmy Burney, Robert Larow, Jonathan Perkins, Damon Sharpe, Jeremy Skaller	J-Remy, Bobby Bass	3:48
5.	"Worldwide"	Edwin "Lil Eddie" Serrano, Christopher Rojas, Emily Phillips	Chris Rojas (RMI)	3:44
6.	"Halfway There"	Sanicola	Sanicola	3:32
7.	"Big Night"	Nasri Atweh, Hollander, Katz	S*A*M and Sluggo	3:16
8.	"Oh Yeah"	Big Time Rush, Jacob Kasher, Rudolf	Rudolf	3:24
9.	"Count on You" (featuring Jordin Sparks)	Nicholas "RAS" Furlong, Carmen Michelle Key, Sammy Kuya, Kasia Livingston	Timothy Foxx	3:29
10.	"I Know You Know" (featuring Cymphonique)	Emanuel Kiriakou, Evan Bogart, Lindy Robbins	Kiriakou	2:55
11.	"Big Time Rush"	Matthew Gerrard, Charlie Midnight, Jay Landers, Scott Fellows	Gerrard	3:17
Total length:				37:55

US iTunes Store bonus track
No.	Title	Writer(s)	Producer(s)	Length
12.	"Stuck"	Salma Ali	Kiriakou	3:05
Total length:				41:00

International bonus tracks
No.	Title	Writer(s)	Producer(s)	Length
12.	"Famous"	Andreas Carlsson, Desmond Child	Papaconstantinou	3:06
13.	"Any Kind of Guy"	Gerrard, Midnight, Landers	Gerrard	3:40
14.	"This Is Our Someday"	Gerrard, Robbie Nevil, Landers	Gerrard	3:03
15.	"Boyfriend" (featuring Snoop Dogg)	Secon, Hector, Francis Zamir, Broadus, Jr.	Secon	3:35
16.	"Boyfriend" (featuring New Boyz)	Secon, Hector, Francis Zamir	Secon	3:34
Total length:				54:53

Digital revised edition bonus track
No.	Title	Writer(s)	Producer(s)	Length
17.	"Stuck"	Salma Ali	Kiriakou	3:05
Total length:				57:58

United Kingdom bonus tracks
No.	Title	Writer(s)	Producer(s)	Length
12.	"Any Kind of Guy"	Gerrard, Midnight, Landers	Gerrard	3:40
13.	"This Is Our Someday"	Gerrard, Nevil, Landers	Gerrard	3:03
14.	"Stuck"	Salma Ali	Kiriakou	3:05
15.	"Boyfriend" (featuring Snoop Dogg)	Secon, Hector, Francis Zamir, Broadus, Jr.	Secon	3:35
16.	"Til I Forget About You" (Cash Cash Remix)	Hollander, Katz, C. Kelly	S*A*M and Sluggo	4:01
17.	"Til I Forget About You" (Halatrax Remix)	Hollander, Katz, C. Kelly	S*A*M and Sluggo	3:49
Total length:				59:08

== Charts ==
=== Weekly charts ===
Weekly chart performance for BTR
Chart (2010–2016)	Peak position
Australian Digital Albums (ARIA)	48
Austrian Albums (Ö3 Austria)	12
Belgian Albums (Ultratop Flanders)	93
Belgian Albums (Ultratop Wallonia)	113
Croatian International Albums (HDU)	22
Dutch Albums (Album Top 100)	43
German Albums (Offizielle Top 100)	16
Greek Albums (IFPI)	45
Irish Albums (IRMA)	17
Italian Albums (FIMI)	24
Mexican Albums (AMPROFON)	9
Portuguese Albums (AFP)	25
Scottish Albums (Official Charts)	17
Swiss Albums (Schweizer Hitparade)	18
UK Albums (Official Charts)	14
US Billboard 200	3
US Kid Albums (Billboard)	1
US Soundtrack Albums (Billboard)	1

=== Year-end charts ===
2010 year-end chart positions for BTR
Chart (2010)	Position
US Kid Albums (Billboard)	5
US Soundtrack Albums (Billboard)	18

2011 year-end chart positions for BTR
Chart (2011)	Position
Mexican Albums (AMPROFON)	32
US Billboard 200	63
US Kid Albums (Billboard)	1
US Soundtrack Albums (Billboard)	5

2012 year-end chart positions for BTR
Chart (2012)	Position
Mexican Albums (AMPROFON)	99
US Kid Albums (Billboard)	13

== Certifications ==
Certifications for BTR
Region	Certification	Certified units/sales
Mexico (AMPROFON)	Platinum	60,000^{^}
United States (RIAA)	Platinum	1,000,000^{‡}
^{^} Shipments figures based on certification alone.^{‡} Sales+streaming figures based on certification alone.

== Release history ==
Release dates and formats for BTR
Region	Date	Edition	Format(s)	Label	Ref.
United States	October 11, 2010	Standard	CD	Nickelodeon/Columbia	
United States	October 11, 2010	US iTunes bonus track	Digital download	Sony	
Mexico	April 15, 2011	International bonus tracks	Digital download	Sony	
Canada	April 15, 2011	International bonus tracks	Digital download	Sony	
Various	April 15, 2011	International digital revised edition	Digital download	Sony	
United Kingdom	July 11, 2011	UK bonus tracks	CD; digital download	Sony	
