= Dale Pa'Ya =

Single by Big Time Rush featuring Maffio or Gente de Zona
- Released: August 19, 2022
- Genre: Latin pop
- Length: 3:07 (feat. Maffio); 3:36 (feat. Gente de Zona)
- Label: Bought the Rights
- Songwriters: Jencarlos Canela; Logan Henderson; James Maslow; Carlos PenaVega; Kendall Schmidt
- Producer: Maffio

Big Time Rush singles chronology
"Honey" (2022)	"Dale Pa'Ya" (2022)	"Paralyzed" (2022)

Maffio singles chronology
"Solo" (2021)	"Dale Pa'Ya" (2022)	"Me gusta Me gusta" (2022)

Gente de Zona singles chronology
"Roneanta" (2022)	"Dale Pa'Ya" (2022)	"Lágrimas de Champan" (2022)

Music video
- "Dale Pa'Ya" on YouTube

"Dale Pa'Ya" (Spanish for "Go Over There") is a song by American pop group, Big Time Rush. The song features Dominican producer and singer, Maffio and was released on August 19, 2022, via Bought the Rights. Another version featuring Gente de Zona was released on October 7, 2022.

== Background and release ==
The group first performed the track live at Madison Square Garden in New York City on June 30, 2022, as part of their Forever Tour. The song was officially released on August 19, 2022, and was originally intended to be a part of an EP the group had in the works. It is the group's first spanglish song and was originally titled "Dale Allá". However, Maffio decided to change "Allá" to "Ya" so it would be easier to pronounce for those who didn't speak spanish. Due to the group's large fanbase in Latin America and South America, they always "wanted to do something to give back." Carlos PenaVega was introduced to Maffio and flew out to Miami, after Big Time Rush went on hiatus in 2014. They wrote a couple of songs together and PenaVega knew that if the band ever got back together, they would use these songs he wrote with Maffio.

In August 2022, they performed the track at the Nickelodeon Mexico Kids' Choice Awards. On October 7, 2022, the group released another version of the song featuring Cuban reggaeton duo, Gente de Zona.

== Composition ==
"Dale Pa'Ya" was written by Jencarlos Canela, Logan Henderson, James Maslow, Carlos PenaVega and Kendall Schmidt, while production was handled by Maffio. The song was recorded in one day. Henderson stated that the group entered the studio "with an open mind," exploring different sounds they haven't done in the past. Speaking about the writing process in an interview with Paper magazine, Schmidt stated,

"Writing in Spanish and English is really cool because for every option, you have two doors. Honestly, it just expands the possibilities to a place where you can really start to pick things out and put them together faster than when you're just racking your brain for things that rhyme with 'baby'."

== Lyrics video ==
A lyrics video for "Dale Pa'Ya" was released on August 30, 2022, and was directed by Carlos PenaVega and Aaron Gatewood.

== Track listing ==
Digital download – feat. Maffio
No.	Title	Length
1.	"Dale Pa'Ya" (featuring Maffio)	3:07

Digital download – feat. Gente de Zona
No.	Title	Length
1.	"Dale Pa'Ya" (featuring Gente de Zona)	3:36

== Charts ==
Chart performance for "Dale Pa'Ya"
Chart (2022)	Peak position
US Latin Digital Song Sales (Billboard)	5

== Release history ==
Release dates and formats for "Dale Pa'Ya"
Region	Date	Format(s)	Version(s)	Label	Ref.
Various	August 19, 2022	Digital download	featuring Maffio	Bought the Rights	
Various	October 7, 2022	Digital download	featuring Gente de Zona	Bought the Rights	
