= Worldwide (song) =

2011 single by Big Time Rush

Single by Big Time Rush

from the album BTR
- Released: July 23, 2011
- Recorded: 2010
- Genre: Soft pop
- Length: 3:44
- Label: Nickelodeon; Columbia
- Songwriters: Eddie Serrano; Chris Rojas; Emily Phillips
- Producer: Rojas

Big Time Rush singles chronology
"Boyfriend" (2011)	"Worldwide" (2011)	"Music Sounds Better with U" (2011)

"Worldwide" is a song by American pop group, Big Time Rush. It is the third single from their debut album, BTR and was released on July 23, 2011. A digital EP was released on August 5, 2011, and includes 2 remixes of "Til I Forget About You" and "Stuck", while the CD single only has the Cash Cash remix of "Til I Forget About You".

== Background and composition ==
"Worldwide" was written by Eddie Serrano, Emily Phillips and Chris Rojas while production was also handled by Rojas. The song runs at 160 BPM and is in the key of E major.

In 2020, the band got back together virtually and released an acoustic version of "Worldwide" for fans to celebrate the 10 year anniversary of the song. The video was uploaded to band member Carlos PenaVega's YouTube channel. The group re-released an acoustic version of song as a single in 2022.

== Reception ==
Markos Papadatos of Digital Journal praised the acoustic version of "Worldwide". He stated, "This version of 'Worldwide' deserves to be enjoyed for its honesty, beauty, and authenticity. Papadatos also complimented their harmonies for its "soaring" and "simply divine" sound.

== Music video ==
The music video for "Worldwide" was released on June 17, 2011, via VEVO. The music video was directed by Scott Fellows and includes actress Katelyn Tarver who also appears on the Big Time Rush TV series as "Jo Taylor". Clips of the video were featured in the Big Time Rush episode "Big Time Break-Up". The video was filmed at an airport, which the group had rented out. Their all-white outfits in the video pay homage to the Backstreet Boys in reference to their hit song "I Want It That Way".

== Chart performance ==
The single peaked at number 3 on the Billboard Kid Digital Song Sales chart lasting 27 weeks and reached the 2011 Billboard Year-End Kid Digital Song Sales chart at number 16. In Germany, the song peaked at number 81 and lasted 2 weeks on chart. The song has sold over a million digital downloads as of 2011. The song was certified gold by RIAA in November 2022.

== Track listing ==
- Worldwide EP
1. "Worldwide" – 3:44
2. "Til I Forget About You (Halatrax Remix)" – 3:49
3. "Til I Forget About You (Cash Cash Remix)" – 4:01
4. "Stuck" – 3:05
- CD single
1. "Worldwide" – 3:44
2. "Til I Forget About You (Cash Cash Remix)" – 4:01
- Digital single
1. "Worldwide (Acoustic)" – 3:50

== Charts ==
=== Weekly charts ===
Weekly chart performance for "Worldwide"
Chart (2010)	Peak position
Germany (GfK)	81
US Kid Digital Songs (Billboard)	3

=== Year-end charts ===
Year-end chart performance for "Worldwide"
Chart (2011)	Position
US Kid Digital Song Sales (Billboard)	16

== Certifications ==
Certifications for "Worldwide"
Region	Certification	Certified units/sales
United States (RIAA)	Gold	500,000^{‡}
^{‡} Sales+streaming figures based on certification alone.

== Release history ==
Release dates and formats for "Worldwide"
Region	Date	Format	Label	Ref.
Various	August 5, 2011	Digital download	Sony	
Various	August 17, 2011	CD	Sony	
