= Columbia/Epic Label Group =

American record label group

- Parent company: Sony Music Entertainment
- Founded: 2009; 17 years ago
- Defunct: 2011
- Status: Defunct
- Distributors: Self-distributed (United States); Sony Music (International)
- Country of origin: United States
- Location: New York, New York

Columbia/Epic Label Group was an American record label group, owned by Sony Music Entertainment. The Columbia/Epic configuration began as the "Sony Music Label Group" during the last year of the Sony BMG merger, and was restructured in 2009 to form a larger umbrella for Columbia Records and Epic Records (as well as their various affiliated labels) to continue to operate. The group also comprises Aware Records, and Daylight Records, while also handling the distribution of E1 Music via Epic Records. Additionally, in conjunction with Legacy Recordings, it also manages the back catalogs of American Recording Company, Portrait Records and Private-I Records. The Columbia/Epic Label Group ended the year 2010 with the largest album market share among all label groups with a 10.96 share, according to The Nielsen Company. Rob Stringer acted as the CEO/Chairman of the company.

The Columbia/Epic Label Group was split in half in July 2011, when Doug Morris became the new head of Sony Music. Epic Records was separated and is now headed by L.A. Reid. This ultimately lead Columbia to being a stand-alone label under Sony Music.

== See also ==
- List of record labels
- Sony Music Entertainment
- RCA/Jive Label Group
