= Paralyzed (Big Time Rush song) =

2022 song by Big Time Rush

Single by Big Time Rush
- Released: November 25, 2022
- Recorded: August 2022
- Genre: Pop rock
- Length: 3:04
- Label: Bought the Rights
- Songwriters: Matt Squire; Pierre Bouvier; Charles Comeau
- Producers: Squire; Will Ventres

Big Time Rush singles chronology
"Dale Pa'Ya" (2022)	"Paralyzed" (2022)	"Can't Get Enough" (2023)

Music video
- "Paralyzed" on YouTube

"Paralyzed" is a song by American pop group, Big Time Rush. It was released on November 25, 2022, via Bought the Rights. The song was originally included as a bonus download in their pre-order edition of their second studio album, Elevate. It was later included in the 2016 Ultimate Fan Edition, a compilation box set released only in Italy.

== Background ==
"Paralyzed" was written by Matt Squire, Pierre Bouvier and Charles Comeau, while production was handled by Squire and Will Ventres. The song is about being too stunned to speak after seeing a girl. The song was originally released in 2011 as an exclusive pre-order bonus download for their second studio album, Elevate. The song was featured in the episode "Big Time Rocker", from the Nickelodeon TV series, Big Time Rush. At the time, the song was not available on music streaming services but due to high demand from fans, the group re-recorded the track and released the song as a single in November 2022. On August 13, 2022, the band encouraged fans to promote "Paralyzed" on their social media platforms, and announced that they began recording vocals for the new version of the track.

== Track listing ==
Digital download – single
No.	Title	Length
1.	"Paralyzed"	3:04

Album version
No.	Title	Length
1.	"Paralyzed"	3:11

== Personnel ==
Credits for "Paralyzed" adapted from Ultimate Fan Edition liner notes, Columbia Records.

- Matt Squire – composer, lyricist, producer
- Pierre Bouvier – composer, lyricist
- Charles Comeau – composer, lyricist
- Will Ventres – producer
- Randy Merrill – mastering engineer
- Kevin McCombs – mixing engineer

== Charts ==
Chart performance for "Paralyzed"
Chart (2022)	Peak position
US Digital Song Sales (Billboard)	30

== Release history ==
Release history and formats for "Paralyzed"
Region	Date	Format	Label	Ref.
Various	November 25, 2022	Digital download	Bought the Rights	
