= Big Time Rush (group) =

American boy band

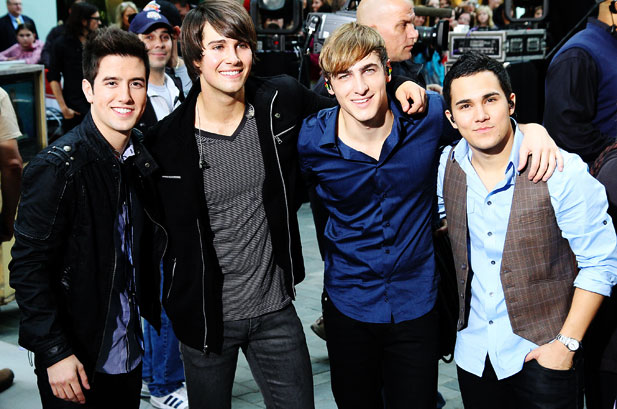
- From left to right: Logan Henderson, James Maslow, Kendall Schmidt and Carlos PenaVega (2010)

Background information
- Also known as: BTR
- Origin: Los Angeles, California, U.S.
- Genres: Pop; dance pop
- Years active: 2009–2014; 2021–present
- Labels: Nick; Columbia; Downtown; Geffen; BMG
- Members: Kendall Schmidt; James Maslow; Carlos PenaVega; Logan Henderson
- Website: bigtimerushofficial.com

Big Time Rush is an American pop music boy band formed in 2009. The group is composed of Kendall Schmidt, James Maslow, Logan Henderson, and Carlos PenaVega. They initially signed with Nick Records in 2009 and then transferred to Columbia Records. The group starred as fictional versions of themselves in Nickelodeon's television series of the same name. The show ran from November 28, 2009, to July 25, 2013. The pilot episode featured the group's first promotional single, "Big Time Rush". The group has released four studio albums: BTR in 2010, Elevate in 2011, 24/Seven in 2013, and Another Life in 2023. The band went on hiatus in 2014, which lasted until 2021 when the group resumed live performances and released the single "Call It Like I See It".

== History ==
=== 2009–2010: Formation and BTR ===
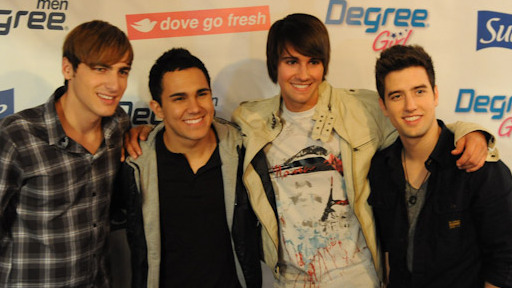
Big Time Rush in 2010

Nickelodeon signed Big Time Rush to a record deal in 2009, simultaneously with the television series, Big Time Rush. Nickelodeon then partnered with Columbia/Epic Label Group to produce the show and include the original music to the show. For the series, their self-titled debut single, "Big Time Rush", was released on November 20, 2009. It debuted during the one-hour series premiere, "Big Time Audition", and was the show's opening theme. The series premiered in the U.S. in November 2009, and became a worldwide success. During the series' first season, Big Time Rush released several promotional singles. The first promotional single, "Any Kind of Guy," was released digitally on February 2, 2010. Another song, "Halfway There", was released to iTunes on April 27, 2010. The single became their first song to chart on the Billboard Hot 100, peaking at number 93. Big Time Rush also covered the Play song "Famous", which was released on June 29, 2010. On August 3, 2010, "City Is Ours" was released digitally as the fourth promotional single from the album.

On September 21, 2010, Big Time Rush released the single "Til I Forget About You", to promote the release of their debut album. The album, titled BTR, was released on October 11, 2010. The album debuted at number three on the Billboard 200, selling 67,000 copies in its first week of release. The album also topped the US Billboard Kid Albums and Soundtrack Albums chart. Its fourth track, "Big Night" debuted on the Billboard Hot 100 at number 79. The album was later certified platinum by the RIAA for sales of over 1,000,000 copies in the US. In support of the album, the group toured across the US in 2010. On November 30, 2010, they released the Christmas-themed EP, Holiday Bundle, with two songs: "Beautiful Christmas" and a cover of "All I Want for Christmas", originally performed by Mariah Carey.

On February 8, 2011, "Boyfriend" was released as the band's second single from the album. The song was later released to mainstream US radio on February 15. "Boyfriend" peaked at number 72 on the Billboard Hot 100, becoming their most successful song to date. It also peaked at number 32 on the Billboard Mainstream Top 40 chart. The song was certified platinum by the RIAA. The band performed the song at the 2011 Kids' Choice Awards, which they were nominated for Favourite Music Group at the ceremony. Big Time Rush was nominated for MTV's Favorite Breakthrough Band in 2011. "Boyfriend" won the award for Favourite Song at the 2011 Kids' Choice Awards Argentina. The song was nominated for a Premios Oye! award in Mexico for Best International English Song of the Year, but lost to Rihanna's single "Diamonds". The album's third single, "Worldwide" was released on July 23, 2011, and peaked at number 81 in Germany. The song was certified gold by the RIAA. In April 2011, the group embarked on their first headlining tour, Big Time Rush in Concert in support of the debut album.

=== 2011–2012: Elevate ===
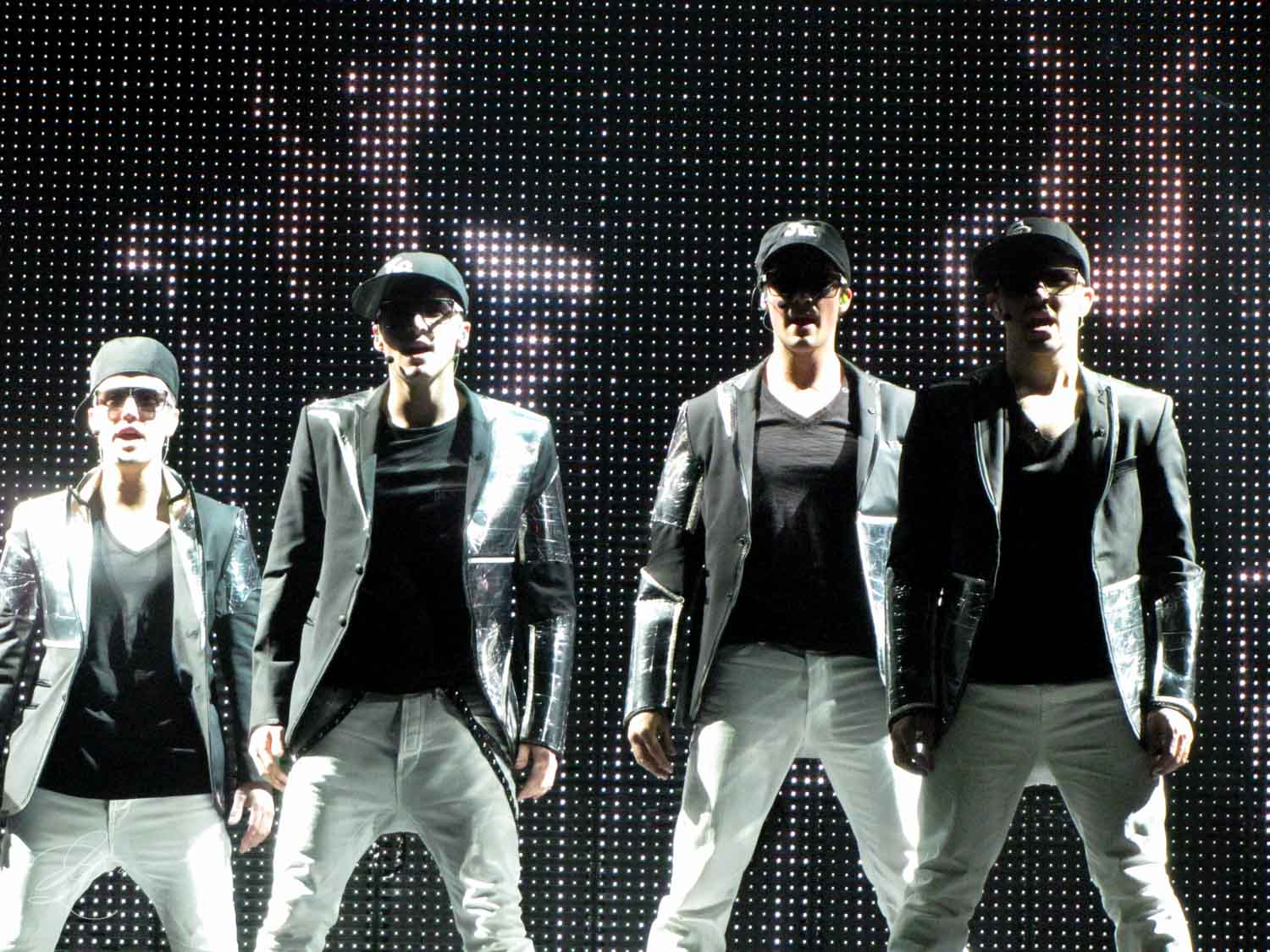
Big Time Rush performing at the 1st Bank Center in Broomfield, Colorado, on February 2, 2012

The group announced they were recording their second studio album shortly after Nickelodeon renewed the series for a third season. On July 22, 2011, the group released a promotional single, "If I Ruled the World" featuring Iyaz, in promotion of their second studio album, Elevate. The group continued to tour across the US during summer 2011. Elevate was released on November 21, 2011, and debuted at number 12 on the Billboard 200, selling over 70,000 copies in its first week. The album was certified gold by the RIAA. Its first single, "Music Sounds Better with U", written by the band and Ryan Tedder, was released on November 1, 2011. The song peaked at number 26 on the US Mainstream Top 40 chart. The other single from the album, "Windows Down", was released on June 25, 2012, and peaked at number 97 on the Billboard Hot 100 and at number 35 on the Mainstream Top 40, making their third top forty entrance in the chart. The song was certified gold by the RIAA. The group opened for Justin Bieber on the My World Tour in Mexico in October 2011. In November 2011, the group were nominated for Best Push Act at the MTV Europe Music Awards.

To promote the release of their second album, the group held their second headlining tour, the Better with U Tour, during which the band played for sixteen dates in several cities in North America in February and March 2012. JoJo opened for Big Time Rush for the first five dates, while One Direction opened for ten of the sixteen dates. In late February, Big Time Rush announced a national summer tour starting July 5, 2012, at the Nationwide Arena in Columbus, Ohio.

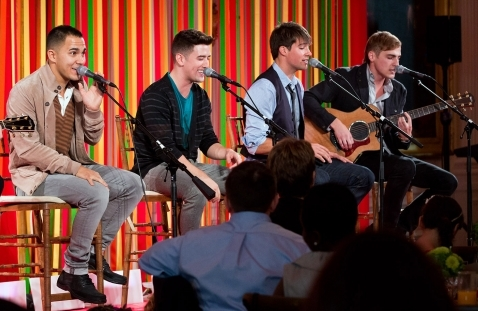
Big Time Rush performing during the Kids' State Dinner in the White House on August 20, 2012

In November 2011, the group announced they would be starring in their full-length 2012 film, Big Time Movie. The film premiered in the United States on March 10, 2012. The film was a ratings success, having over thirteen million views during its premiere weekend. The film was released alongside the EP Big Time Movie Soundtrack. The EP peaked at number 44 on the Billboard 200.

=== 2013–2014: 24/Seven ===
In 2012, Nickelodeon renewed the Big Time Rush series for a 13-episode fourth season; production started in early 2013. Big Time Rush released their third studio album, 24/Seven, on June 11, 2013. The album peaked at number four on the Billboard 200 and marked the lowest first-week sales for the group, selling 35,000 copies. Their previous two, BTR and Elevate sold 67,000 copies and 70,000 copies in their first weeks, respectively. It was preceded by the release of the promotional single "Like Nobody's Around". Logan Henderson described the album as "much more down-to-earth pop" and stated that album was "much more organic" than their previous two. The group co-headlined the Summer Break Tour with Victoria Justice from June to August 2013. In May 2014, the group won the World's Best Live Act award at the 2014 World Music Awards.

In 2013, after the Big Time Rush television series ended, the group members continued touring until March 2014, and the band then went on hiatus to pursue solo careers. Kendall Schmidt stated at that time that they would like to reunite as a band if they had an opportunity. Schmidt later reformed the band Heffron Drive with Dustin Belt in May 2013. James Maslow competed on Dancing with the Stars in 2014, and Celebrity Big Brother in 2018, while Carlos PenaVega hosted the Nickelodeon game show Webheads in June 2014, and voiced the character Bobby Santiago on Nickelodeon's animated series The Loud House. Henderson took a hiatus from performing before launching a solo career, releasing his debut single "Sleepwalker" in 2017.

=== 2020–present: Reunion and Another Life ===
On April 20, 2020, the band reunited virtually, as they uploaded a video on the band's social media platforms, sharing some wishes to their fans about the COVID-19 pandemic. On June 16, the band released an acoustic performance of "Worldwide". In December 2020, member James Maslow uploaded a video of the band performing their song "Beautiful Christmas" via YouTube.

On July 19, 2021, the group announced reunion performances which occurred in December 2021. The group released the single "Call It Like I See It" on December 13, 2021, marking the group's first release since 2013. On February 21, 2022, the band announced on Good Morning America that they would be holding a reunion tour throughout 2022. Four days later, the band released the single "Not Giving You Up". The group continued releasing non-album singles in 2022, including "Fall", "Honey" and "Dale Pa'Ya" (featuring Maffio), before announcing that two EPs and an album were in production.

On February 6, 2023, the group released the single "Can't Get Enough," which served as the lead single for their fourth studio album. The group also headlined the Can't Get Enough tour. Their fourth album, Another Life, was released on June 2, 2023. The album's second single, "Waves", was released on May 3. Another Life peaked at number 15 on the US Billboard Top Current Album Sales chart. The third single, "Weekends", was released on October 24, 2023, alongside the announcement of the album's deluxe edition, which was released on November 10.

On February 21, 2025, the group announced the In Real Life Worldwide Tour, which began on July 9, 2025. In addition, the tour featured appearances by original cast members Katelyn Tarver and Stephen Kramer Glickman, who played Jo Taylor and Gustavo Roque, respectively, in the original television series. The tour concluded in Melbourne on March 22, 2026.

== Artistry ==
=== Musical style and influences ===
Because the group is associated with the TV series and children's network Nickelodeon, they have been presented as a "child-friendly" group, but have musical differences. In a review of their first studio album, BTR, Jessica Dawson from Common Sense Media wrote: "Big Time Rush is a standout, not only because of their boyish charm and good looks, but because their music is a cool blend of synth-pop, hip-hop, and boy-band harmonies." The sound of the band is described as "pop-inspired dance-rock". The group's influences include The Monkees, NSYNC, The Backstreet Boys, The Beatles, ABBA, Daft Punk, and Bee Gees.

=== Public image ===
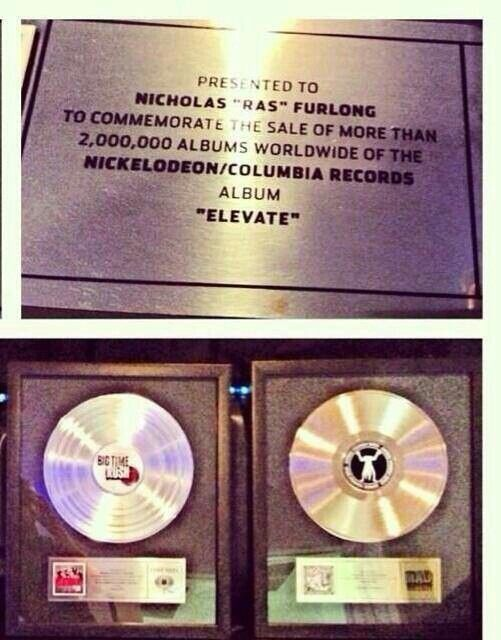
Elevate platinum record after the album sold more than 2 million units worldwide

The group has been compared to other boy bands of the time such as One Direction and the Wanted. Michael O'Connell from The Hollywood Reporter said "One Direction is but one group in this resilient and timeless fad. They follow the recent success of fellow Brits [the Wanted] and Nickelodeon's cross-market creation [Big Time Rush]. One [One Direction] is fluke. Two [the Wanted] is a coincidence. And three [Big Time Rush] is a trend that you want to father your unborn children.' Melinda Newman from The Washington Post stated, "In the grand tradition of boy bands, these acts share certain traits with their similarly manufactured pop ancestors: Members of the Wanted and Big Time Rush auditioned for their parts at a casting call. The members of One Direction were put together by Simon Cowell after trying out individually for the British edition of The X Factor." However, she positively compared them to the Monkees by saying, "Big Time Rush is similar to the Monkees with its own TV series as a launchpad. The group appeals to kids, tweens, teens, and adults. They are also credited as the pop group that have once again restored creditably, relevance, and for relaunching boy bands back into the public eye once again."

In Parade's 2012 poll, Big Time Rush was voted the "Best Boy Band in the World", topping both One Direction and the Wanted. Over 800,000 votes were cast. The band was featured on the cover of the August 5, 2012, issue of Parade, which was a national top-seller. An interview and photo set highlighting the group's win that coincided with the honor was featured in the same issue. The magazine's website also featured the group amongst its list of "Greatest Boy Bands of All Time", along with NSYNC and the Backstreet Boys. Big Time Rush have been honored and recognized multiple times by major media outlets throughout their time as a group.

Due to their extreme worldwide popularity and success (along with being heavily credited as one of the bands that helped bring back the boy band wave), the Washington Times Magazine ranked Big Time Rush Number 15 of their "Top 20 Best Boy Bands of the Decade" in 2012, and number 28 on the POP! Goes The Charts website list of the "Top 40 Best Boy Bands of the past 25 years" in 2013.

To Toronto Sun, PenaVega talked about the group's impact on both music and television: "I think the music could stand alone, but I don't know if it would be as powerful. The show has definitely been our main audience. We have four million kids watching. So when you put a song out, four million kids hear it. When you put a song on the radio, you're not going to have four million people listening. It's a blessing and a curse being on Nickelodeon – it's gotten us where we are now, though some people are standoffish to us because of that. But we have to be grateful that Nickelodeon gave us this opportunity. Abandoning the show would not be the best idea."

== Band members ==
Current

- Kendall Schmidt – vocals, guitar (2009–2014, 2021–present)
- James Maslow – vocals, piano (2009–2014, 2021–present)
- Carlos PenaVega – vocals (2009–2014, 2021–present), ukulele (2022–present)
- Logan Henderson – vocals (2009–2014, 2021–present)

Touring

- Cody Perrin – lead guitar, music director (2021–present)
- Vicky Warwick – bass, keyboards (2021–present)
- Greg Garman – drums (2021–present)

== Discography ==
- BTR (2010)
- Elevate (2011)
- 24/Seven (2013)
- Another Life (2023)

== Tours ==
=== Headlining ===
- Big Time Rush in Concert (2011)
- Better with U Tour (2012)
- Big Time Summer Tour (2012)
- Summer Break Tour (2013)
- Live World Tour (2014)
- Forever Tour (2022–2023)
- Can't Get Enough Tour (2023)
- UK & Europe Tour (2024)
- Australia & Asia Tour (2024)
- In Real Life Worldwide Tour (2025)

=== Concert Shows ===
- Big Time Rush Live (2021)

== Awards and nominations ==
Year	Award	Category	Recipient(s)	Result	Ref.
2010	Australian Kids' Choice Awards	Favorite International Band	Big Time Rush	Nominated	
2011	Australian Kids' Choice Awards	Hottest Guy Hotties	Themselves	Nominated	
2011	Golden Bravo Otto Awards	Super Pop Artist/Group of the Year	Big Time Rush	Won	
2011	UK Kids' Choice Awards	Favourite Band	Big Time Rush	Nominated	
2011	Kids' Choice Awards	Favorite Music Group	Big Time Rush	Nominated	
2011	Argentina Kids' Choice Awards	Favorite Song	"Boyfriend"	Won	
2011	MTV Europe Music Awards	Best New Global Push Artist	Big Time Rush	Nominated	
2011	Youth Rocks Awards	Rockin' Group of the Year	Big Time Rush	Nominated	
2011	MTV BuzzWorthy Awards	Favorite Breakthrough Band or Artist of the Year	Big Time Rush	Nominated	
2012	Shorty Awards	Best Band in Social Media	Big Time Rush	Nominated	
2012	Shorty Awards	Best Music Artist in Social Media	Big Time Rush	Nominated	
2012	Shorty Awards	Best Celebrity on Social Media	Themselves	Nominated	
2012	Kids' Choice Awards	Favorite Music Group	Big Time Rush	Won	
2012	Meus Prêmios Nick	Favorite International Music Artist	Big Time Rush	Nominated	
2012	Argentina Kids' Choice Awards	Favorite International Artist or Group	Big Time Rush	Won	
2012	Golden Bravo Otto Awards	Super Pop Artist/Group of the Year	Big Time Rush	Won	
2012	Golden Bravo Otto Awards	Favorite Internet Star	Themselves	Nominated	
2012	Mexico Kids' Choice Awards	Favorite International Artist	Big Time Rush	Nominated	
2012	Los Premios Telehit	Best International Pop Group	Big Time Rush	Nominated	
2012	Los Premios Telehit	Most Popular Artist	Big Time Rush	Nominated	
2013	Shorty Awards	Best Band in Social Media	Big Time Rush	Nominated	
2013	Kids' Choice Awards	Favorite Music Group	Big Time Rush	Nominated	
2013	Kids' Choice Awards	Fan Army	Rushers	Won	
2013	Mexico Kids' Choice Awards	Favorite International Artist or Group	Big Time Rush	Won	
2013	Fuse TV Awards	Best New Artist	Big Time Rush	Nominated	
2013	Premios Oye!	Best International English Single of the Year	"Boyfriend"	Nominated	
2013	Los Premios Telehit	Boy Band of the Year	Big Time Rush	Nominated	
2013	Teen Choice Awards	Choice Music Group	Big Time Rush	Nominated	
2013	Golden Bravo Otto Awards	Best Global Pop Band or Group	Big Time Rush	Nominated	
2013	Golden Bravo Otto Awards	Favorite Internet Star	Themselves	Nominated	
2014	World Music Awards	World's Best Live Act	Big Time Rush	Won	
2014	Colombia Kids' Choice Awards	Favorite Artist or Group International	Big Time Rush	Won	
2022	iHeartRadio Music Awards	Best Fan Army	Rushers	Nominated	
