= Big Night (song) =

Song by Big Time Rush

from the album BTR
- Studio: Right Hook Productions, (New York, NY); Westlake Recording Studios (Los Angeles, CA)
- Genre: Electropop
- Length: 3:16
- Label: Nickelodeon; Columbia
- Songwriters: Nasri Atweh; Sam Hollander; Dave Katz
- Producer: S*A*M and Sluggo

Music video
- "Big Night" on YouTube

"Big Night" is a song by American pop group, Big Time Rush. It is the seventh track from their debut studio album, BTR. Despite not being released as a single, the song peaked at number 79 on the Billboard Hot 100.

== Background ==
The group first performed "Big Night" live at J-14's 'In Tune' concert event at the Hard Rock Cafe in Times Square, New York, on September 9, 2010. They also performed the song as an encore during their performance at the Mall of America in Bloomington, Minnesota. It was featured on their Nickelodeon TV series on the episode, "Big Time Halloween". The song was a part of the setlist for their first headlining tour, Big Time Rush in Concert.

== Composition ==
"Big Night" was written by Nasri Atweh, Sam Hollander and Dave Katz, while production was handled by S*A*M and Sluggo. Instrumentations were recorded at Right Hook Productions in New York City and vocals were recorded at Westlake Studios in Los Angeles.

== Critical reception ==
Alistair McGeorge of Female First called the track, "a solid effort at a club track that could be a, no pun intended, big hit for the quartet." Chris Ryan of MTV described the track as a "pulsating electronic-tinged pop song."

== Chart performance ==
"Big Night" debuted at number 20 on the US Heatseekers Songs chart. The song peaked at number three on the chart, before debuting on the Billboard Hot 100 at number 79, selling 46,000 copies in the United States on the week of January 15, 2011. The song also topped the US Kid Digital Songs and remained 42 weeks on chart.

== Music video ==
The music video for "Big Night" premiered on the Nickelodeon website on December 10, 2010. It was released via VEVO on February 10, 2011, and was directed by Ed Cardenas. The video features footage of the group on the road, performing and meeting fans at malls and amusement parks all across the country.

== Personnel ==
Credits for "Big Night" adapted from album's liner notes.

- S*A*M and Sluggo – producer, bass, drums, guitar, keyboards
- Chad Royce – co-producer, engineering, programming
- Scott Mann – co-producer, engineering, programming
- Nasri Atweh – vocal production
- Nick James – vocal production
- Serban Ghenea – mixing (Mixstar Studios, Virginia Beach, VA)
- John Hanes – mixing engineer
- Tim Roberts – assistant mixing engineer
- Sam Hollander – programming
- Dave Katz – programming

== Charts ==
=== Weekly charts ===
Weekly chart performance for "Big Night"
Chart (2010–2011)	Peak position
US Billboard Hot 100	79
US Kid Digital Songs (Billboard)	1
US Pop Digital Song Sales (Billboard)	31

=== Year-end charts ===
Year-end chart positions for "Big Night"
Chart (2011)	Position
US Kid Digital Songs (Billboard)	6
