= If I Ruled the World (Big Time Rush song) =

2011 single by Big Time Rush feat. Iyaz

Promotional single by Big Time Rush featuring Iyaz

from the album Elevate
- Released: July 22, 2011
- Recorded: March 2011
- Length: 3:00
- Label: Nickelodeon; Columbia
- Songwriters: Emanuel Kiriakou; Evan Bogart; Lindy Robbins
- Producer: Kiriakou

Music video
- "If I Ruled the World" on YouTube

"If I Ruled the World" is a song by American pop group, Big Time Rush, featuring British Virgin Islands singer Iyaz. It was released on July 22, 2011, as the first promotional single from their second studio album, Elevate.

== Background and release ==
"If I Ruled the World" premiered via MTV on July 21, 2011, before it was released for digital download on July 22. The group performed the song live for the first time on July 22, at the Pacific Amphitheatre in Costa Mesa, California. The song was added on the setlist for their headling tour Big Time Rush in Concert, in the summer of 2011. They also performed it on their Better with U Tour in February and March 2012.

== Composition ==
"If I Ruled the World" was written by Emanuel Kiriakou, Evan Bogart and Lindy Robbins, while production was handled by Kiriakou. Originally titled, "Rule the World", the song was recorded in March 2011 and is about "self-acceptance and living life big."

== Critical reception ==
Jenna Hally Rubenstein of MTV described the song as an "impossibly catchy, perfectly pop" track. She stated, "Led by a guitar-driven track, Big Time Rush's vocals are perfectly in check." This Must Be Pop Awards predicted the song as "a future hit."

== Chart performance ==
"If I Ruled the World" peaked at number six on the Billboard Bubbling Under Hot 100 and stayed four weeks on the chart. The song also topped the US Kid Digital Songs chart and remained 29 weeks on the chart. On the Billboard Kid Digital Songs 2011 year-end chart, the song was ranked at number eight. The song has sold over a million digital downloads as of December 2011.

== Music video ==
Two music videos were released for "If I Ruled the World". The first one premiered on July 23, 2011, and was featured on their Nickelodeon TV series on the episode, "Big Time Single" and showcases the group in a recording studio performing the track. Soon after, the band is seen traveling across the globe, to Hawaii, Buckingham Palace, the Taj Mahal, Russia and China. At the end of the video, all the people Big Time Rush met along the way come together for a huge dance party on the beach.

The second music video was released on August 5, 2011, featuring the band traveling to the United States, the United Kingdom, and Germany, performing on stage for their fans.

== Personnel ==
Credits for "If I Ruled the World" adapted from album's liner notes.

- Emanuel Kiriakou – producer
- Andrew Goldstein – additional drum programming
- Jens Koerkemeier – additional keyboards, editing, engineering
- Serban Ghenea – mixing
- John Hanes – engineering, mixing

== Charts ==
=== Weekly charts ===
Weekly chart performance for "If I Ruled the World"
Chart (2011)	Peak position
US Bubbling Under Hot 100 (Billboard)	6
US Heatseeker Songs (Billboard)	17
US Kid Digital Songs (Billboard)	1
US Pop Digital Song Sales (Billboard)	37

=== Year-end charts ===
Year-end chart performance for "If I Ruled the World"
Chart (2011)	Position
US Kid Digital Song Sales (Billboard)	8

== Release history ==
Release dates and formats for "If I Ruled the World"
Region	Date	Format	Label	Ref.
Various	July 22, 2011	Digital download	Nickelodeon; Columbia	
