= Halfway There (Big Time Rush song) =

Promotional single by Big Time Rush

from the album BTR
- Released: April 27, 2010
- Studio: Westlake Recording Studios (Los Angeles, California)
- Length: 3:32
- Label: Nickelodeon; Columbia
- Songwriter: Eric Sanicola
- Producer: Sanicola

Music video
- "Halfway There" on YouTube

"Halfway There" is a song by American pop group, Big Time Rush. It was released on April 27, 2010, via iTunes. The song serves as the third promotional single from their debut studio album, BTR.

== Background and composition ==
"Halfway There" has a positive message about "achieving your dreams and persevering." The song was written and produced by Eric Sanicola, and was recorded at Westlake Recording Studios in Los Angeles, California. Described as Logan Henderson's "favourite" off the album, he stated that they experimented with an R&B sound and pop music. It was released on April 13, 2010, for streaming on the group's MySpace page, before it was released for digital download on April 27, via iTunes.

== Critical reception ==
Jessica Sager of PopCrush stated, "This Big Time Rush song has positive lyrics that undoubtedly encourage Rushers to stay hopeful during the rough times. It also has an insanely catchy, synth-driven beat that will certainly make you strap on those dancing shoes, especially during the empowering chorus."

== Chart performance ==
"Halfway There" debuted at number 93 on the Billboard Hot 100, marking it the group's first song to chart on the Hot 100. The song also reached number five on the US Kid Digital Songs chart. In November 2022, the song received a gold plaque by the Recording Industry Association of America (RIAA) for sales and streaming of 500,000 units.

== Music video ==
The music video for "Halfway There" premiered on April 16, 2010, following an episode from Big Time Rush, "Big Time Jobs". The video was directed by Petro and features footage of the group walking together in an alley near a brick wall with behind-the-scenes footage from shooting episodes of their TV series. The song was also featured on the episode "Big Time Demo".

== Personnel ==
Credits for "Halfway There" adapted from album's liner notes.

- Eric Sanicola – composer, lyricist, bass, drums, guitar, keyboards, producer
- Rob Chiarelli – mixing, recording

== Charts ==
Chart performance for "Halfway There"
Chart (2010–2011)	Peak position
US Billboard Hot 100	93
US Kid Digital Songs (Billboard)	5
US Pop Digital Song Sales (Billboard)	28

== Certifications ==
Certifications for "Halfway There"
Region	Certification	Certified units/sales
United States (RIAA)	Gold	500,000^{‡}
^{‡} Sales+streaming figures based on certification alone.

== Release history ==
Release dates and formats for "Halfway There"
Region	Date	Format	Label	Ref.
Various	April 27, 2010	Digital download	Nickelodeon; Columbia	
