= Any Kind of Guy =

Promotional single by Big Time Rush

from the album BTR
- Released: February 2, 2010
- Length: 3:40
- Label: Nickelodeon; Columbia
- Songwriter(s): Matthew Gerrard; Charlie Midnight; Jay Landers
- Producer(s): Gerrard

Music video
- "Any Kind of Guy" on YouTube

"Any Kind of Guy" is a song by American pop group, Big Time Rush. It was released on February 2, 2010, via iTunes and Apple Music as their second promotional single from their debut studio album, BTR, which appears on the international version of the album released in April 2011.

== Background and composition ==
"Any Kind of Guy" was written by Matthew Gerrard, Charlie Midnight and Jay Landers, while production was handled by Gerrard. The song is about "the decision-making process of a girl who can't decide what kind of boy is right for her." It was featured on their Nickelodeon TV series on the episode, "Big Time Love Song". The song was also featured on the Nickelodeon game, Big Time Beats.

== Release ==
"Any Kind of Guy" was released on February 2, 2010, via iTunes, as a digital-only promotional single and was included on their Best of Season 1 EP. The song was later included on the international version of their debut studio album, BTR, as a bonus track and was released on April 15, 2011.

== Critical reception ==
Jessica Sager of PopCrush praised Logan Henderson's falsettos on the track and stated "in part because it's classic boy band fare and also because each of the Big Time Rush members have distinct solos in the track." The song is also considered a "fan favorite" amongst the fanbase.

== Chart performance ==
"Any Kind of Guy" peaked at number 24 on the Billboard Bubbling Under Hot 100 chart. The song also reached number 15 on the US Kid Digital Songs chart. The song sold 94,000 copies in the United States in April 2010. In November 2022, the song received a gold plaque by the Recording Industry Association of America (RIAA) for sales and streaming of 500,000 units.

== Music video ==
A sneak peek for the music video for "Any Kind of Guy" was released on their Twitter page on May 20, 2010. The video premiered the following day, via MTV. The video was released via VEVO on May 24, and was directed by Ryan McNeill. Filmed on February 15, 2010, the video showcases the group performing in front of colored backgrounds and throughout the video, a hand raises Polaroid photographs into frame that cause the band to change into different outfits. McNeill spoke about the concept of the video stating, "the girl is trying to figure out what kind of guy she wants them to be."

An alternate music video was shot for promotional use on the Nickelodeon channel and was featured on their website. The video, directed by Marcus Wagner, and depicts the boys sitting and recording in a studio, cut together with footage from "Big Time Love Song".

== Personnel ==
Credits for "Any Kind of Guy" adapted from album's liner notes.

- Matthew Gerrard – producer, composer, bass, guitar, keyboards, arrangement, mixing, programming
- Charlie Midnight – composer
- Jay Landers – composer
- Travis Ference – mixing
- Hanson Hsu – mixing
- Randy Cooke – drums

== Charts ==
Chart performance for "Any Kind of Guy"
Chart (2010)	Peak position
US Bubbling Under Hot 100 (Billboard)	24
US Heatseeker Songs (Billboard)	20
US Kid Digital Songs (Billboard)	15
US Pop Digital Song Sales (Billboard)	39

== Certifications ==
Certifications for "Any Kind of Guy"
Region	Certification	Certified units/sales
United States (RIAA)	Gold	500,000^{‡}
^{‡} Sales+streaming figures based on certification alone.

== Release history ==
Release dates and formats for "Any Kind of Guy"
Region	Date	Format	Label	Ref.
Various	February 2, 2010	Digital download	Nickelodeon; Columbia	
