= City Is Ours =

Promotional single by Big Time Rush

from the album BTR
- Released: August 3, 2010
- Recorded: 2009
- Studio: Westlake Recording Studios (Los Angeles, California)
- Length: 3:12
- Label: Nickelodeon; Columbia
- Songwriter: Eric Sanicola
- Producer: Kevin Rudolf

Music video
- "City Is Ours" on YouTube

"City Is Ours" is a song by American pop group, Big Time Rush. It was released digitally on August 3, 2010, as the fifth promotional single from their debut studio album, BTR.

== Background and composition ==
"City Is Ours" was written by Eric Sanicola and was produced by Kevin Rudolf. The song was recorded at Westlake Recording Studios in Los Angeles, California. Speaking with Artistdirect about the song, James Maslow stated, "We relate the song to everywhere we go. When we tour around the country, it's going to mean, 'We're partying. This city is ours. Let's rock out and have a good time. Everybody believe you're meant to be here'."

== Music video ==
The music video for "City Is Ours" premiered via VEVO on July 23, 2010. The video was filmed in Los Angeles, California, at the Million Dollar Hotel. The video was filmed to be included in their TV series, Big Time Rush in the episode, "Big Time Music Video".

Speaking about the concept of the video, Maslow stated, "We wanted to create this idea where we shoot a music video in the show, and all these directors have terrible ideas about how to make the city theirs. It was our way of saying, 'Hey, we just moved to Los Angeles. Let's show everybody we can have a good time, and this is what we love to do'."

== Track listing ==
Digital download
No.	Title	Length
1.	"City Is Ours"	3:12
2.	"City Is Ours" (music video)	3:11

== Credits and personnel ==
Credits for "City Is Ours" adapted from BTR liner notes, Columbia Records.

- Eric Sanicola – composer, lyricist
- Kevin Rudolf – bass, drums, guitar, engineering, recording, producer
- Neal H Pogue – additional engineering, mixing, percussions
- Jeremiah "JHop" Olvera – assistant engineering

== Charts ==
=== Weekly charts ===
Weekly chart performance for "City Is Ours"
Chart (2010–2011)	Peak position
US Bubbling Under Hot 100 (Billboard)	5
US Heatseeker Songs (Billboard)	11
US Kid Digital Songs (Billboard)	4
US Pop Digital Song Sales (Billboard)	30

=== Year-end charts ===
Year-end chart performance for "City Is Ours"
Chart (2011)	Position
US Kid Digital Song Sales (Billboard)	25

== Release history ==
Release dates and formats for "City Is Ours"
Region	Date	Format	Label	Ref.
United States	August 3, 2010	Digital download	Nickelodeon; Columbia	
United Kingdom	December 3, 2010	Digital download	Nickelodeon; Columbia	
