= Boyfriend (Big Time Rush song) =

Single by Big Time Rush featuring Snoop Dogg or New Boyz

from the album BTR
- Released: February 8, 2011
- Recorded: 2010
- Genre: Dance-pop; teen pop
- Length: 3:35 (single version); 3:21 (album version)
- Label: Nickelodeon; Columbia
- Songwriters: Wayne Hector, Lucas Secon
- Producer: Lucas Secon

Big Time Rush singles chronology
"Til I Forget About You" (2010)	"Boyfriend" (2011)	"Worldwide" (2011)

Snoop Dogg singles chronology
"Wet" (2010)	"Boyfriend" (2011)	"Mr Endowed (Remix)" (2011)

New Boyz singles chronology
"Backseat" (2011)	"Boyfriend" (2011)	"Better with the Lights Off" (2011)

Music video
- "Boyfriend" on YouTube

"Boyfriend" is a song recorded by American pop band Big Time Rush for their debut studio album BTR (2010). The song was produced by Lucas Secon and written by him and Wayne Hector. It features rap verses by American rapper Snoop Dogg. It was released as the album's second official single on February 8, 2011, and was solicited to mainstream radio on February 15, 2011 via Columbia Records.

The song "Boyfriend" was met with mixed reviews by music critics; some praised it as a catchy single while others called it unoriginal and safe. Critics, however, praised Snoop Dogg for adding flavor to the song with his verses. The song was, however, a moderately international success, charting in Austria, Germany, Mexico, Belgium and the United Kingdom as well as a host in other countries. In the United States, the song peaked at number seventy-two on the Billboard Hot 100 becoming their highest-charting single to date. And it later earned a platinum certification in the US for sales of more than 1,000,000 sold downloads. In 2018, the song was ranked ninety-seventh by Billboard in their compilation of the 100 Greatest Boyband Songs of All Time.

== Background and composition ==
"Boyfriend" was written and produced by Lucas Secon while Wayne Hector, credited as Wayne Anthony Hector, also provided writing. In addition to writing and producing, Secon programmed and arranged the song while performing on drums and synthesizers. Recording sessions took place at Westlake Recording Studios in Los Angeles, California, headed by Rob Kinelski, and at Mux Music Studios in London, England, headed by Secon and Pete Hoffman, both of which mixed the song. Editing through ProTools was done by Hoffman. Mintman performed on the guitars, bass and keys, which was recorded at the Westlake Recording Studios. "Boyfriend" was released as Big Time Rush's second single on February 8, when the remix featuring Snoop Dogg was released through digital distribution. A week later, Columbia Records serviced it to contemporary hit radio and the version featuring the New Boyz to rhythmic crossover in the United States. On April 19, 2011, a new version of the song featuring the New Boyz was released for digital distribution.

"Boyfriend" features the use of monochromatic beats, condensed instrument sounds, layered and tuned vocals and autotune. According to the digital music sheet published at Musicnotes.com by Sony/ATV Music Publishing, the song is composed in the key of E major. It is set in common time and has a moderate tempo of 80 beats per minute. The band's vocals range from E_{3} to B_{5}. It begins with a basic sequence of A-E-F#m-E and transitions to F#m-G#m-C#m as it chord progression. The single versions feature rap verses from Snoop Dogg and the New Boyz. The lyrics pertain to being the ideal boyfriend for someone, indicated in lines like, "I don't care at all what you've done before, all I really want is to be your boyfriend."

== Critical response ==
"Boyfriend" received a generally mixed response from contemporary music critics. Matt Collar of AllMusic called the "head-bobbin'" tune one of the album's highlights. Jessica Dawson of Common Sense Media called the song a "catchy single" that "lingers in your head, with the boys pouting, "B-b-boy-boy-boy-boy-boyfriend," and the tune's easy, hip-pop rhythm." Dawson also commented, " No doubt fans will be wishing the guys were singing to them", awarding the song a three star rating. Caroline Sullivan of The Guardian praised Snoop Dogg's verses, commenting that they add "pizzazz" to "an otherwise anodyne dance-pop tune." Alistair McGeorge of Female First called it a "safe, by-the-numbers pop track that heavily relies on over-production and autotone." Brandon Soderberg of Popdust gave "Boyfriend" a three star rating, commending Snoop Dogg for providing a contrast to the "oddball charm" he presents on his guest features on pop songs. Soderberg credited Snoop Dogg for "inject[ing] specificity into an otherwise pretty ordinary song" and further praised his verses for their placement, writing that they provide "a crucially rewarding sense of narrative."

== Commercial performance ==
In the United States, "Boyfriend" entered the Billboard Hot 100 at number seventy-nine in the issue dated March 12, 2011. The song ascended and descended on the chart for several weeks before reaching its peak at number seventy-two in the issue dated May 7, 2011. "Boyfriend" shipped over 1,000,000 copies in the United States, earning a platinum certification by the Recording Industry Association of America (RIAA). The single was also certified gold in New Zealand in March 2024 for denoting consumption sales of over 15,000 units. It also peaked at number thirty-two on the Pop Songs chart and at number fifty-eight on Hot Digital Songs. Across Europe, "Boyfriend" fared better on the charts. In Austria, the song peaked at number fifty-five on the singles chart. In Germany, the song debuted at number fifty-one and rose to number forty-nine in the next week. In 2016, in France, after the success of the TV show on Gulli and an album of the group's greatest hits who was released only in the country song peaked at number thirty-one.

== Music video ==
The video features with Snoop Dogg living in the year 2099, and inviting Big Time Rush from the present to perform and join a party from a portal. At the party, Kendall is drinking a futuristic drink with a girl, James is dancing with two girls outside, and briefly showing him cross dressing. Logan is floating around with a girl outside on a light board, and Carlos is dancing with another girl. Solo shots of the boys performing the song and scenes of the entire group performing the song on a stage is intercut throughout the video. After Snoop Dogg performs his verse, he later waves good-bye and the group exit out of the portal into 2011.

== Awards and nominations ==
Awards and nominations for "Boyfriend"
Year	Organization	Award	Result	Ref(s)
2011	Argentina Kids' Choice Awards	Favorite Song	Won	
2013	Premios Oye!	Best International English Single of the Year	Nominated	

== Track listing ==
- Digital download
1. "Boyfriend" (featuring Snoop Dogg) – 3:35
- Maxi CD
1. "Boyfriend" (featuring Snoop Dogg) – 3:35
2. "Boyfriend" (Jump Smokers remix radio edit; featuring Snoop Dogg) – 3:07
3. "Boyfriend" – 3:21
4. "Boyfriend" (video; featuring Snoop Dogg) – 3:41
- CD
1. "Boyfriend" (featuring Snoop Dogg) – 3:35
2. "Boyfriend" – 3:21
- Digital download
1. "Boyfriend" (featuring Snoop Dogg) – 3:35
2. "Boyfriend" – 3:21
3. "Boyfriend" (video; featuring Snoop Dogg) – 3:41
- Digital download (remixes)
1. "Boyfriend" (Jump Smokers remix radio edit; featuring Snoop Dogg) – 3:07
2. "Boyfriend" (Jump Smokers remix radio edit) – 2:52
3. "Boyfriend" (Jump Smokers remix extended version; featuring Snoop Dogg) – 3:33

== Credits ==
- Lucas Secon – songwriting, production, arrangement, programming, recording engineer, drums, synths, mixing
  - Recorded at Mux Music Studios in London, England
- Wayne Anthony Hector – songwriting
- Rob Kinelski – recording engineer
  - Recorded at Westlake Recording Studios in Los Angeles, California
- Pete Hoffman – recording engineer, ProTools editing, mixing
  - Recorded at Mux Music Studios in London, England
- Mintman – additional guitars, bass, keys
  - Instruments recorded at Westlake Recording Studios in Los Angeles, California

Credits adapted from BTR liner notes, Columbia Records.

== Charts ==
=== Weekly charts ===
Weekly chart performance for "Boyfriend"
Chart (2011)	Peak position
Austria (Ö3 Austria Top 40)	55
Belgium (Ultratip Bubbling Under Wallonia)	36
Germany (GfK)	49
Lithuania (EHR)	37
Mexico Ingles Airplay (Billboard)	33
Scottish Singles Sales (Official Charts)	83
UK Singles (Official Charts)	76
US Billboard Hot 100	72
US Dance Airplay (Billboard)	25
US Kid Digital Song Sales (Billboard)	1
US Pop Airplay (Billboard)	32
US Pop Digital Song Sales (Billboard)	25
US Rhythmic Airplay (Billboard)	35

Chart (2016)	Peak position
France (SNEP)	31

=== Year-end charts ===
Yearly chart performance for "Boyfriend"
Chart (2011)	Position
US Kid Digital Song Sales (Billboard)	1

== Certifications ==
Certifications for "Boyfriend"
Region	Certification	Certified units/sales
New Zealand (RMNZ)	Gold	15,000^{‡}
United States (RIAA)	Platinum	1,000,000^{‡}
^{‡} Sales+streaming figures based on certification alone.

== Release history ==
Release dates and formats for "Boyfriend"
Region	Date	Format(s)	Version(s)	Label	Ref.
Various	February 8, 2011	Digital download	Remix featuring Snoop Dogg	Sony	
United States	February 15, 2011	Contemporary hit radio; rhythmic contemporary radio	Remix featuring New Boyz	Columbia	
United States	February 15, 2011	Contemporary hit radio; rhythmic contemporary radio	Remix featuring Snoop Dogg	Columbia	
Italy	March 4, 2011	Radio airplay	Remix featuring Snoop Dogg	Sony	
Germany	April 1, 2011	Digital download	Remix featuring Snoop Dogg; original	Sony	
United Kingdom	April 15, 2011	Digital download	Remix featuring Snoop Dogg; original	Sony	
United Kingdom	April 15, 2011	Digital download	Remixes	Sony	
United Kingdom	April 17, 2011	Digital download	Original	Sony	
United Kingdom	April 18, 2011	Maxi CD	Remix featuring Snoop Dogg	Columbia	
Canada	April 19, 2011	Digital download	Remix featuring New Boyz – radio edit	Sony	
United States	April 19, 2011	Digital download	Remix featuring New Boyz – radio edit	Sony	
