= Til I Forget About You =

2010 single by Big Time Rush

Single by Big Time Rush

from the album BTR
- B-side: "Famous"
- Released: September 21, 2010
- Genre: Pop; pop rock; electropop
- Length: 3:58
- Label: Nickelodeon; Columbia
- Songwriters: Claude Kelly; Sam Hollander; Dave Katz
- Producer: S*A*M and Sluggo

Big Time Rush singles chronology
"Til I Forget About You" (2010)	"Boyfriend" (2011)

Music video
- "Til I Forget About You on YouTube

"Til I Forget About You" is the debut single by American pop group, Big Time Rush. It was released via iTunes on September 21, 2010, as the lead single from their debut studio album, BTR (2010).

== Background ==
"Til I Forget About" was written by Sam Hollander, Dave Katz and Claude Kelly, while production was handled by S*A*M and Sluggo. In an interview with Artistdirect, James Maslow stated that the song is about being able to get over a girl and moving on.

== Release ==
Before the iTunes release, the song premiered on September 14, 2010, via the group's music site and Nickelodeon's website. The single served as the lead single of the group's album, BTR. The physical release of the single was available on September 28, 2010 as a CD single containing the song "Famous" as the B-side in selected stores in the United States. The remix EP was released as a United Kingdom exclusive on August 23, 2011.

== Music video ==
The music video debuted on television on October 1, 2010 on Nickelodeon after the premiere of the Big Time Rush episode, "Big Time Fans". The video begins with the foursome playing inside their tour bus when suddenly Kendall gets a text message from his girlfriend which says "its over". As they arrive to their next venue they find out it's actually a country club and then Carlos finds a button on his Camcorder that says: ROCK OUT, after touching it the camcorder changes the way people and things look and makes them rock, which is when the music sequence starts. The video ends at an indoor concert the group holds inside one of the rooms of the country club. According to Kendall Schmidt, the group rented a mansion to film the video.

== Track listing ==
- Digital download
1. "Til I Forget About You" – 3:57
- US CD single
1. "Til I Forget About You" – 3:57
2. "Famous" – 3:06
- UK remix EP
1. "Til I Forget About You" (radio edit) – 3:22
2. "Til I Forget About You" (Cash Cash remix—radio edit) – 3:30
3. "Til I Forget About You" (Halatrax remix—radio edit) – 3:21
4. "Til I Forget About You" (YBZ mix) – 3:58

== Charts ==
=== Weekly charts ===
Weekly chart performance for "Til I Forget About You"
Chart (2010)	Peak position
Canada (Nielsen Soundscan)	2
US Bubbling Under Hot 100 (Billboard)	11
US Heatseeker Songs (Billboard)	12
US Kid Digital Songs (Billboard)	1
US Pop Digital Songs (Billboard)	33

=== Year-end charts ===
2010 year-end chart positions for "Til I Forget About You"
Chart (2010)	Position
US Kid Digital Songs (Billboard)	8

2011 year-end chart positions for "Til I Forget About You"
Chart (2011)	Position
US Kid Digital Songs (Billboard)	11

== Certifications ==
Certifications for "Til I Forget About You"
Region	Certification	Certified units/sales
United States (RIAA)	Gold	500,000^{‡}
^{‡} Sales+streaming figures based on certification alone.

== Release history ==
Release dates and formats for "Til I Forget About You"
Region	Date	Format	Version	Label	Ref.
United States	September 21, 2010	Digital download	Original	Columbia	
United States	September 28, 2010	CD	Original	Columbia; Nickelodeon	
Australia	January 7, 2011	Digital download	Original	Columbia	
Austria	January 7, 2011	Digital download	Original	Columbia	
Belarus	January 7, 2011	Digital download	Original	Columbia	
China	January 7, 2011	Digital download	Original	Columbia	
Cyprus	January 7, 2011	Digital download	Original	Columbia	
Czech Republic	January 7, 2011	Digital download	Original	Columbia	
Denmark	January 7, 2011	Digital download	Original	Columbia	
Finland	January 7, 2011	Digital download	Original	Columbia	
Germany	January 7, 2011	Digital download	Original	Columbia	
Italy	January 7, 2011	Digital download	Original	Columbia	
Kenya	January 7, 2011	Digital download	Original	Columbia	
Latvia	January 7, 2011	Digital download	Original	Columbia	
Lithuania	January 7, 2011	Digital download	Original	Columbia	
Netherlands	January 7, 2011	Digital download	Original	Columbia	
New Zealand	January 7, 2011	Digital download	Original	Columbia	
Norway	January 7, 2011	Digital download	Original	Columbia	
Poland	January 7, 2011	Digital download	Original	Columbia	
Russia	January 7, 2011	Digital download	Original	Columbia	
Slovenia	January 7, 2011	Digital download	Original	Columbia	
South Korea	January 7, 2011	Digital download	Original	Columbia	
Spain	January 7, 2011	Digital download	Original	Columbia	
Sweden	January 7, 2011	Digital download	Original	Columbia	
Switzerland	January 7, 2011	Digital download	Original	Columbia	
Ukraine	January 7, 2011	Digital download	Original	Columbia	
United Kingdom	August 12, 2011	Digital download	Remixes EP	Sony	
