= Emelie Norenberg =

Swedish singer and designer (born 1985)

Emelie Törling
- Born: Emelie Catharina Leontine Norenberg; 21 February 1985 (age 41); Stockholm, Sweden
- Genre: Pop
- Occupations: Singer, designer
- Formerly of: Play

Emelie Catharina Leontine Törling (née: Norenberg, born 21 February 1985) is a Swedish singer and designer. She is known for her music.

== Early life ==
Emelie Norenberg was born on 21 February 1985 and grew up north of Stockholm. She has one sister, Amanda, and one brother, Oscar. As a child, she was most interested in music and gymnastics and learned piano by ear at age five. She then trained in classical music for years. She competed in the Gymnastic Nationals. She attended Rytmus music school. Her classmates included former Play members, Rosanna Munter and Fanny Hamlin. Törling has lived and studied in Abu Dhabi, London, and Sydney, as well as working as a flight attendant in many Middle Eastern countries.

== Career ==
Törling has been a demo artist and freelance singer, and a backup singer for E-Type. She toured with future Play member Sanne Karlsson. Törling released a single, "Strong" by Stellar Project in the U.S.

=== Play ===
Play was originally formed in 2001 in Sweden by current manager, Laila Bagge. It was made of four young girls: Faye Hamlin, Anaïs Lameche, Rosanna and Anna Sundstrand. They had limited success; their greatest hit was their debut, "Us Against The World", peaking at No. 14. Fanny left in 2004, replaced by Janet Leon, until the group split in 2005. A reunion came in 2009 with original members Anais and Fanny, along with new member Sanne Karlsson, on Made in Sweden. They released their comeback single, "Famous" on 15 February 2010, which reached No. 1. Play spent the rest of the year promoting and touring Sweden to promote their album Under My Skin. The plan for 2011 was to again make an impact in the US.

Törling became friends with Sanne and Anaïs and former member Rosanna. Towards the end of 2010, Faye, whom Törling also knew, was no longer mentioned in Play's blog, and no longer appeared in pictures or public appearances. Multiple sources stated that Fanny was working on a solo career. On 7 February 2011, the band officially announced that Faye had left Play for good and would be replaced by Törling.

Play were planning their comeback to the U.S. markets, and going on frequent trips to America to attend meetings. An EP was planned to be released in August 2011, but in May 2011 the group split.

=== Solo career ===
Törling plays in a band named "America", with her husband Gustaf Törling. The style is dreamy desert rock. On 19 July 2011, Stellar Project released digitally their new single "Strong" featuring her vocals.

== Personal life ==
She formed a jewelry brand (Leontine) in August 2012. She worked and a band named America, together with her then-fiancé Gustaf Törling. In June 2013, they married, and in December 2014, their first child, a daughter was born, 10 weeks prematurely. In July 2018, they welcomed their second daughter.

== Sources ==
- "Emelie – Annakopito - FRESHNET.se". annakopito.freshnet.se (in Swedish). Archived from the original on 25 December 2010.
- "Valentine NYC". valentine-nyc.com. Archived from the original on 8 December 2013.
