= Sanne Karlsson =

Swedish singer

- Karlsson preforming in 2010

Background information
- Born: Sanne Anna Sofie Stenbeck; 11 November 1985 (age 40)
- Origin: Vendelso, Sweden
- Genres: Pop, Funk, Soul, dance, Europop, pop rock

Sanne Anna Sofie Stenbeck (known professionally Sanne Karlsson; born 11 November 1985) is a Swedish singer and songwriter. She has contributed her vocals to Ghost vs Sanne, E-Type and Polyphonics among others, and is most famous for being a part of the Swedish pop group, Play.

== Early life ==
Sanne Karlsson was born on 11 November 1985. She was raised in Vendelsö, Sweden with her three siblings. She learned how to play the piano and began to sing at the age of 9. When Sanne was 10, her dad bribed her with a Super NES to go to music lessons, even though her interests laid with horse riding and animals. She was accepted into Haninge Music School for singing classes. Her first choice for secondary school was Berga Natural Resources, but she didn't want to put music down completely, so she attended Rytmus, one of Sweden's most well renowned music schools.

== 2004–09: Career beginnings ==
Sanne finished her education at Rytmus in 2004, and ventured into a music career. One of her first releases was when she teamed up with Swedish funk & house music producers, The Polyphonics, and recorded a song called "Changing Times", which reached no. 1 in DJ Magazines' Hype Chart. She also appeared in various songs on their album, Escapades in 2009. A cover of Michael Jackson's "Bad" was recorded with the Polyphonics in 2009 for the Michael Jackson tribute Beat It: We Love MJ. In addition, Sanne recorded a song called "Wake Up Boy" with one of the members of the Polyphonics, known as 'Swingkid' on his solo album, "This Electric Life", also released in 2009. Her music with the Polyphonics & Swingkid was very popular in far eastern countries such as Japan and Korea.

In 2007 Sanne received a call from a colleague at Universal, who asked her if she wanted to sing on popular Swedish singer, E-Type's new single, "True Believer". After a meeting with E-Type and major producer Max Martin, the recording was done and the song was released in 2007, reaching No. 1 in Sweden with a Gold sales certificate, as well as No. 3 in Finland, and gaining high airplay in UK. Due to the success of the first single, they decided to add Sanne to the group. The album, Eurotopia was released on 31 October, with Sanne singing on most of the tracks. The album peaked at No. 10 in Sweden. Three more singles with success to a lesser extent: "Eurofighter", "The Tide" and "Make Us High", and Sanne toured Europe with E-Type, and future Play member Emelie Norenberg until 2009.

The Swedish producers, Ghost (Johan Ekhé & Ulf Lindström) set up a project in 2008 called Ghost vs Sanne: a band with Ghost writing and producing and Sanne doing the vocals. Ghost is one of the most sought-after producers in Sweden and has been nominated for 3 Grammys, and are behind artists like Robyn, Beverley Knight and Agnes. Ghost discovered Sanne after she replied to an advertisement they put in the newspaper. A single called "Hold This Girl" was released digitally, and the album, also under the name Hold This Girl was released in Canada in October 2008. Ghost vs Sanne toured the U.S. twice, and the album was released worldwide in April 2009 with a new cover and a few new tracks.

Sanne has also performed in many clubs and bars as a Freelance singer, been a Demo artist and recorded advert jingles for products such as Loka, Škoda and Com Hem. She has also written and recorded solo songs as well as lending her vocals to artists such as Nikki Ponte, Kim Fransson, Seven-G and My Tandem.

== 2009–2011: Time in Play ==
Play was originally formed in 2001 in Sweden by current manager, Laila Bagge. It was made of four young girls: Fanny Hamlin, Anaïs Lameche, Rosanna and Anna Sundstrand. Play sold over 1 million albums and toured North America along with popular teen artists, such as A-Teens, Aaron Carter, 'N Sync and Destiny's Child. Fanny left the group in 2003 to pursue a college education, and a new member, Janet Leon was added to the group, until the group split in 2005.

On 26 November 2009, former members Fanny and Anaïs appeared on the Swedish radio stations NRJ and RIXFM, along with Sanne. They announced that, as a trio, they would return as "Play" and were to partake in the filming of a reality show Made in Sweden, showing the group getting ready for their comeback to the music industry. The show also showed Anaïs and Fanny searching for a new member, as Rosanna was meant to join them in the reunion, but quit 3 weeks before filming. Sanne first met Play when she was recording a demo for their new album, and with the absence of the third member, they suggested that Sanne should join the line up. The show filmed Sanne getting to know the girls and after four episodes their comeback single, "Famous" was released, peaking at No. 1 in Sweden.

The group released one more single, "Not The One", before the new album, Under My Skin, was released on 21 April 2010 which reached No. 7 on the Swedish Albums Chart. In October Play recorded a song called "Destiny" for the Disney Channel Movie, Avalon High without Fanny. Fanny had also stopped making appearances with Play and was roumered to be working on a solo career. In February 2011, Play-officially announced that Fanny had left the group. As a result, Emelie Norenberg, a good friend of Sanne's who also toured on E-Type's tour with her, was added to the group.

Play: Anaïs, Sanne & Emelie, were in the United States planning a return to the international music scene. They met with stylists, TV producers, as well as musicians during a trip to Los Angeles and New York in January and were hoping to release an EP in the United States in August. Play officially split up in early 2011, though an official announcement by their US manager was posted on the band's official fansite, Play Mania in May 2011.

While in Play, Sanne was a lead vocalist and generally sang Soprano harmonies. When Faye left the group the second time Sanne became the main vocalist of the group.

== Discography ==
Year	Artist	Album
2006	Polyphonics	Changing Times
2007	E-Type	Eurotopia
2008	Ghost vs Sanne	Hold This Girl (Canadian version)
2009	Ghost vs Sanne	Hold This Girl
2009	Swingkid	Wake Up Boy
2009	Various Artists	Beat It: We Love MJ
2009	Polyphonics	Escapades
2010	Play	Under My Skin
