= Under My Skin (Play album) =

Studio album by Play
- Released: 21 April 2010
- Recorded: 2009–2010
- Genre: Pop; Europop
- Length: 49:52
- Label: Bonnier Music
- Producer: Desmond Child; Laila Wahlgren; Anders Bagge; Andreas Carlsson

Play chronology
Girl's Mind (2005)	Under My Skin (2010)

Singles from Under My Skin
- 1. "Famous" Released: February 15, 2010; 2. "Not the One" Released: March 10, 2010

Under My Skin is the fifth and final studio album by Swedish girl group Play, released on 21 April 2010. The first single off the album was "Famous". It debuted at #7 on the Swedish Albums Chart - their first entry on the chart. This was also the group's last album, as less than half a year after Hamlin left a second time the group also disbanded for a second time.

== Background and promotion ==
The Play band members had not seen each other for several years, until one day when Anaïs Lameche managed to get a hold of Fanny Hamlin ("Faye") via phone. The two of them talked over lunch about reuniting Play, and decided that it was time for Play to return. After the launch of Made in Sweden season two, Laila Bagge, one of the band's former managers, also wanted to reunite the girls as a band. Hamlin and Lameche returned for the reunion; Rosie Munter dropped out in the last minute, and Anna Sundstrand did not join the reunion due to living in the United States. With only two remaining members, they began the search for a third member. After about a week, Sanne Karlsson, who was previously a member of the band Ghost vs Sanne, joined the group after recording a demo song for Play.

Season two of the TV program Made in Sweden showcased the hard work all three girls put into making their new album and promoting Play, also including the search for the third member Karlsson. Their new album was recorded in four weeks, and after that, Play performed their new songs live at several locations, such as Elgiganten stores and television shows in Sweden. They also made other appearances, and took other media trips like radio, magazines, and interviews.

== Track listing ==
No.	Title	Writer(s)	Length
1.	"Famous"	Andreas Carlsson, Desmond Child	2:52
2.	"Consequence of You"	Hanne Sørvaag, Martin Hansen	3:55
3.	"Show Me What You Got"	Anders Bagge, Johan Kronlund, Didrik Thott	3:22
4.	"Not the One"	Bagge, Arnthor Birgisson, Carlsson, Amanda Lameche	3:38
5.	"Under My Skin"	Philippe-Marc Anquetil, Bagge, Stefan Örn	3:45
6.	"Trash"	Carlsson, Child, Steven Sater	3:02
7.	"Second Hand Love"	Tobias Kampe Flygare, Anton Friskopp, Miriam Nervo, Olivia Nervo	3:35
8.	"Girls"	Bagge, Carlsson, Peer Åström, Vanilla Black	3:12
9.	"When Love Is Bleaching Bad"	Bagge, Fanny Hamlin, Sanne Karlsson, Kronlund, Anaïs Lameche	3:14
10.	"Personal Victory"	Carlsson, Child	3:08
11.	"Famous" (Electro Remix)	Carlsson, Child	3:15
12.	"Famous" (Club Remix)	Carlsson, Child	6:22
13.	"Consequence of You (Dance Mix)"		3:43
14.	"Famous" (Bonus Video)	Carlsson, Child	2:50
Total length:			49:52

== Personnel ==
Play

- Faye Hamlin – lead vocals
- Anaïs Lameche – lead vocals
- Sanne Karlsson – lead vocals

Crew

- Andreas Carlsson - songwriting (1, 6, 8, 10)
- Desmond Child - songwriting (1, 6, 10)
- Steven Sater - songwriting (6)
- Anders Bagge - songwriting (8)
- Peer Åström - songwriting (8)
- Vanilla Black - songwriting (8)
- Alex Lamb - remix (11)
- Andreas Gyllström - remix (12)

== Charts ==
Chart (2010)	Peak position
Swedish Albums (Sverigetopplistan)	7
