= Faye (musician) =

Swedish singer, songwriter, and model

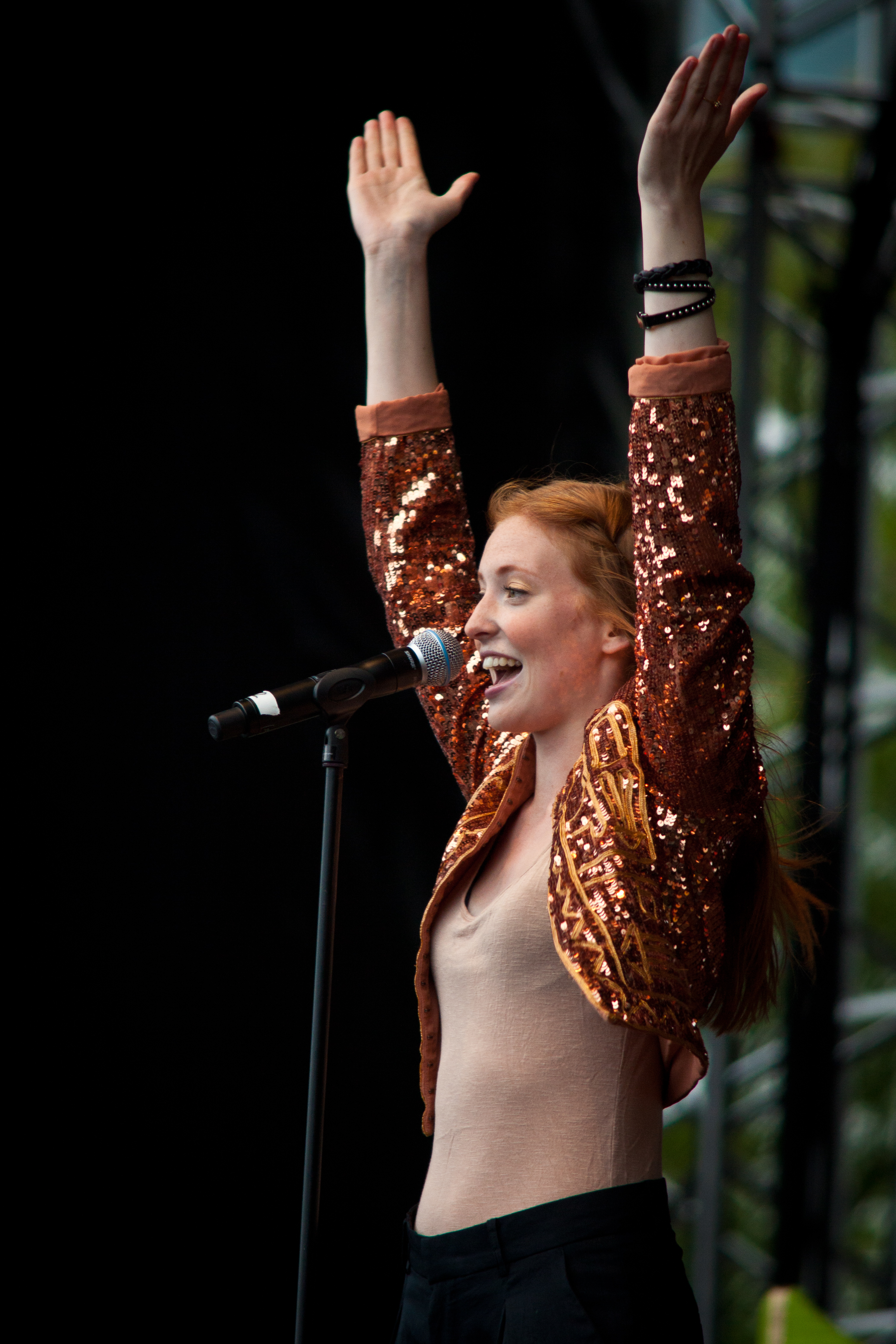
- Hamlin performing in 2010

Background information
- Also known as: Fanny
- Born: Fanny Matilda Dagmar Hamlin; 1987 (age 38–39)
- Genres: Pop, dance, electropop
- Occupations: Singer, songwriter, model
- Years active: 2000–2003, 2009–2014
- Label: Hybris (2011–2013) Best Fit Recordings (2012–2013) Capitol Records (2013–2014)
- Formerly of: Play
- Website: www.fayeofficial.com

Fanny Matilda Dagmar Hamlin (born 1987), known professionally as Faye, is a Swedish former singer, songwriter, and model. She was the lead singer of the Swedish pop group Play in the early 2000s. In 2012, she debuted as a solo artist. Hamlin quit the music industry in 2014.

== Early life ==
Fanny "Faye" Matilda Dagmar Hamlin grew up in Enskededalen, a suburb outside of Stockholm, Sweden, with her parents, older sister, and older brother. When she was 11 years old, she won a national talent contest. Hamlin attended Rytmus, a performing arts high school in Stockholm. She has referenced Beyonce and Destiny's Child as influences.

== Career ==
=== 2000–2003: Play ===
In 2000, at the age of 13, Faye was one of hundreds of young girls to audition for a spot in Play, an all-girl pop group formed by Laila Bagge, Anders Bagge, and Andreas Carlsson in Stockholm, Sweden. After nationwide auditions, Faye and her best friend Rosanna were selected to be a part of the group. While rehearsing at Laila's home, Tommy Mottola (who was involved in a phone conversation with Bagge) overheard the group in the background. He was so impressed with their sound that he flew them to Los Angeles a few days later. After performing for label executives, Play was signed to Columbia Records. Faye was considered to be the lead voice of Play and, as a mezzo-soprano, she was often heard singing the melody and doing the ad-libs in songs.

In December 2001, Play released their first album entitled Us Against the World. The album peaked at number 74 on the Billboard Top 200 and their debut single, "Us Against the World", found success on Radio Disney and Nickelodeon. Play also made a cameo appearance in Mary-Kate and Ashley Olsen's movie Holiday in the Sun performing "Us Against the World". To promote the album, the group toured nearly non-stop for a year, opening for Destiny's Child, Aaron Carter, and touring with Eden's Crush and A-Teens. Their song "Disco Hippie" was featured on a commercial for Build-A-Bear Workshop. In 2002, they recorded a song and later a filmed a video with Lil' Fizz, formerly of B2K, for the Master of Disguise film.

In June 2003, the group released their sophomore album titled Replay, which debuted at number 67 on the Billboard Top 200, and remained on the chart for several weeks. The album's second single "I Must Not Chase The Boys" reached Number 10 on MTV's TRL. The group later went on to perform "I Must Not Chase The Boys" on Live with Regis and Kelly. After nearly a year hiatus, it was officially reported in October 2003 that Faye had left the group to return to college, and was replaced by Janet Leon, a 13-year-old singer from Gothenburg.

In 2010, Faye recalled her decision to leave the group saying, "In autumn 2003, I chose to drop out of Play. The sense of feeling lost, tired and alone had been around for a while, but it was in the autumn that I became fed up and made the decision to leave. Strangely enough, it was loneliness that was most evident towards the end, although I had always had people around me, it was still short of securing the pillars. I was far from home and just wanted to be with family and friends. I chose to invest all my time in high school. Luckily, my mom helped me with applications to the music school Rytmus."

=== 2004–2009: Modeling and music ===
After leaving Play, Faye returned to college and modeling, attending the music school Rytmus and signing with Swedish modeling agency Synkcasting. Faye appeared in several photo shoots and runway shows. She also kept her foot in the music business, releasing occasional singles through modeling campaigns and providing background vocals.

In 2004 Faye performed a duet with Adam Appel titled "Ready for Love" that was featured on the soundtrack to the Swedish film Kärlekens Språk. In 2006 Faye provided background vocals for Swedish artist Velvet's album Finally, most notably on the track "Mi Amore."

In February 2008, Faye appeared in commercials for Swedish clothing chain MQ. The commercials featured Faye performing the Fleetwood Mac hit "Go Your Own Way" in a style all her own. Behind the scene videos were posted to MQ's website and the full song and music video were made available for download.

In November 2008, Faye was once again featured in an MQ campaign. This campaign saw Faye perform the Supertramp hit "Give a Little Bit" alongside some of Sweden's most popular stars including Nina Persson of The Cardigans, Darin and Marie Serneholt. The full version of the song was made available for purchase and proceeds benefited The Red Cross.

=== 2009–2011: Play's reunion ===
In 2009, Play was reported to have reunited, without original member Anna Sundstrand. Two weeks before they were scheduled to go back into the studio, member Rosanna Munter decided not to continue with the group, saying in a statement she "has worked hard on my own music, and I want to give it the chance to be heard.". The group continued as a trio with Faye Hamlin, Anaïs Lameche, and a new member, Sanne Karlsson via the popular Swedish television program, Made in Sweden. The group achieved a number one single with "Famous" and a top ten album, Under My Skin in Sweden. The comeback was a success. Shortly after the group came to promote the album in the U.S., Faye, now going by her birth name, Fanny, left the group for a second time to pursue her own music career in late 2010. She later stated that the atmosphere in the group had changed, and that she no longer wanted to be part of it. In January 2011, it was officially announced that Faye had left Play; she was replaced by Swedish singer Emelie Norenberg. No new music with Norenberg was ever released. The group split for the third time in mid-2011. Plans for the group's subsequent album and a promo tour in the U.S. were cancelled.

=== 2011–2014: Solo career ===
In January 2012, it was announced that Faye had signed with Scandinavian record label Hybris. Working with Swedish producing duo Montauk, her debut single, "Come to Me," was released for digital download in Sweden and in the United States on 29 February 2012. The single showed a new direction for Faye that was more mature and complex electropop than her previous work.

In late May 2012, Faye signed with UK-based record label Best Fit Recordings. Her second single, "Water Against The Rocks," was released in the UK on 25 June 2012. The official music video for Water Against The Rocks premiered on 28 May 2012 on The Guardian's official website. On 20 September 2012 Best Fit Recordings announced two new singles "Mad Dog" and "Breathe Out." and on 12 December 2012, Best Fit Recordings released a fifth teaser track, "Silent."

In January 2013, Faye opened a sold out show as support for British singer-songwriter Jessie Ware at New York City's Bowery Ballroom. This performance was followed by two additional performances at Pianos and Glasslands. In March 2013 Faye set her sights on Los Angeles, performing three shows.

In March 2013, Faye performed a set of shows at South by Southwest music festival in Austin, Texas. Her experience at SXSW was featured in an episode of the American late night television program Last Call with Carson Daly, marking her debut on US television as a solo artist.

She wrote a complete album with producing duo Montauk and has co-written a song, "The Fever Keeps Me Breathing," for Swedish producer Kleerup's upcoming album. She has said her debut album was written during "a low period in [her] life" which influenced the dark pop elements.

On 9 March 2014 Faye announced via a Facebook post that she has signed to Capitol Records and has been working with producers Rodney "Darkchild" Jerkins (Mary J. Blige, Natasha Bedingfield, Janet Jackson) and Daniel Heath (Lana Del Rey). Hamlin quit the music industry in 2014 and plans for her solo debut album were shelved indefinitely.

== Personal life ==
After leaving the music industry in 2014, Hamlin returned to her previous work as a fashion and commercial model in her native Sweden. In 2016, she revealed via her personal Instagram account that she had changed careers and is now a home interior stylist and set designer. In May 2017, her work was featured in a collaboration with the Swedish headphones and accessories brand, Urbanears. She works as a stylist for the Swedish home design magazine Plaza Interiör. On 21 September 2017, she announced on her Instagram page the birth of her first child, a daughter named Joni Florence Kerstin. Hamlin married her longtime boyfriend in June 2019 in Flatön, Sweden. In April 2021, she gave birth to her second child, a daughter named Fleur. She resides in the suburbs of Stockholm with her husband and their children.

== Discography ==
=== Singles ===
Year	Single	Peak chart positions		Album
Year	Single	UK	SE	Album
2012	"Come to Me"	—	—	Unreleased album
2012	"Water Against The Rocks"	—	—	Unreleased album
2012	"Breathe Out"	—	—	Unreleased album
2012	"Mad Dog"	—	—	Unreleased album
"—" denotes releases that did not chart
