= Us Against the World (album) =

Studio album by Play
- Released: 12 December 2001
- Recorded: 2000–2001
- Genre: Pop; teen pop
- Length: 39:23; 24:24 (US EP)
- Label: Columbia
- Producer: Arnthor Birgisson; Anders Bagge; Evan Rogers; Carl Sturken; Ric Wake; Berny Cosgrove; Richie Jones; Cool Cat Chris

Play chronology
Us Against the World (2001)	Playin' Around (2003)

Singles from Us Against The World
- 1. "I'm Gonna Make You Love Me" Released: 25 May 2002

Us Against the World is the debut album by Swedish girl group Play, released on 12 December 2001. In the United States, it was released on 25 June 2002 as the EP Play. The album charted on the Billboard 200, peaking at number 74 on 5 October 2002, and on 24 March 2003 the album was certified Gold by the RIAA.

== Track listing ==
No.	Title	Writer(s)	Producer(s)	Length
1.	"Us Against the World"	Amanda Lameche, Samantha Mumba, Arnthor Birgisson, Anders Bagge	Birgisson, Bagge	3:42
2.	"Cinderella"	Kevin Savigar, Lindy Robbins	Richie Jones, Ric Wake	3:36
3.	"Hopelessly Devoted"	John Farrar	Cool Cat Chris	3:21
4.	"Remember to Forget"	Birgisson, Bagge, Kara DioGuardi	Birgisson, Bagge	3:27
5.	"Is It Love"	Max Martin, Jörgen Elofsson	Hitvision	3:33
6.	"Disco Hippie"	Steve Wolf, Ray Davies, Denny Kleiman, Charlie Pennachio	Hitvision	3:22
7.	"I Don't Get Down Like That"	Carl Sturken, Evan Rogers	Sturken, Rogers	3:43
8.	"I'm Gonna Make You Love Me" (feat. Chris Trousdale of Dream Street)	Gamble and Huff, Jerry Ross	Kevin Clark, Hitvision, Berny Cosgrove	3:06
9.	"To Live and to Die For"	Martin Ankelius, Henrik Andersson, Anna-Lena Margaretha Hogdahl	Hitvision	3:18
10.	"Never Never Land"	Rene Tromborg, Rasmus B. Bdenke, Robbins, Damon Sharpe	Jones, Wake	3:28
11.	"Watch Me Now"	Bagge, Steve Diamond, Birgisson	Bagge, Birgisson	4:47

=== North American Play EP ===
No.	Title	Writer(s)	Producer(s)	Length
1.	"I'm Gonna Make You Love Me" (feat. Chris Trousdale of Dream Street)	Gamble, Huff, Ross	Clark, Hitvision, Cosgrove	3:06
2.	"Us Against the World"	Lameche, Mumba, Birgisson, Bagge	Birgisson, Bagge	3:42
3.	"Cinderella"	Savigar, Lindy Robbins	Jones, Wake	3:36
4.	"Hopelessly Devoted"	Farrar	Cool Cat Chris	3:21
5.	"Is It Love"	Martin, Elofsson	Hitvision	3:33
6.	"I Don't Get Down Like That"	Sturken, Rogers	Sturken, Rogers	3:43
7.	"Disco Hippie"	Wolf, Davies, Kleiman, Pennachio	Hitvision	3:22

- Note: A snippet of the song "Boys Lie" was included on the "Us Against the World" single in America. The full song did not end up making the album or EP, though it has since leaked online. "Boys Lie" was written by Russ DeSalvo, Martin Briley, Dana Calitri and produced by Ric Wake.

== Personnel ==
- Faye Hamlin (lead vocals)
- Anaïs Lameche (lead vocals)
- Anna Sundstrand (backing vocals)
- Rosie Munter (backing vocals)

== Charts ==
Chart (2002)	Peak position
US Billboard 200	74
