= Anna Sundstrand =

Swedish singer

- Born: Anna Maria Karolina Sundstrand; 22 February 1989 (age 37); Stockholm, Sweden
- Genres: Pop, dance
- Occupations: Singer, dancer, actress, model
- Years active: 2000–present
- Labels: Columbia (with Play, 2001–2005), DampCellar Music (solo, 2010–present)
- Formerly of: Play
- Children: 1

Anna Maria Karolina Sundstrand (born 22 February 1989) is a Swedish singer. She is an original member of the Swedish pop group, Play.

== Early life ==
Sundstrand was born on 22 February 1989 in Stockholm, Sweden. She began dancing when she was four years old and attended Sway Dance School in Stockholm as well as her bandmate Anaïs Lameche. She is a relative of the Swedish actress Greta Garbo.

== Play (2001–2005) ==
Sundstrand was asked to join Play by the group's manager, Laila Bagge, who discovered Sundstrand at her dancing school after seeing her performing at the school. Sundstrand was the first member of the new group, in which she sang alto harmonies and solos.

In 2001, Play's first single "Us Against the World" was featured on the Mary-Kate and Ashley Olsen film Holiday in the Sun and Disney Channel show Lizzie McGuire. "Us Against the World" was followed by "I'm Gonna Make You Love Me," a cover of a song by Diana Ross and the Supremes and The Temptations. The song featured Chris Trousdale from Dream Street and received high rotation on Radio Disney. Their debut album, Us Against the World, was released in 2001.

In 2003, Replay was released, including two singles, "Whole Again" (a cover of the Atomic Kitten song) and "I Must Not Chase the Boys," It also featured another Diana Ross cover, "Ain't No Mountain High Enough." After Replay's release, Faye Hamlin left the group and was replaced by Janet Leon.

In 2004, Don't Stop the Music was released, including the single "everGirl," a tie-in to a Nickelodeon show that was never aired. They also re-recorded "Ain't No Mountain High Enough" with Leon. Later that year, the Christmas album Play Around the Christmas Tree was released. It was Sundstrand's final album with the group. After the band's first split, Sundstrand moved to NYC after being signed to New York-based modeling agency Model Management Group (MMG).

=== Play reunion (2009–2011) ===
In 2009, Play announced their reunion with original members Hamlin and Anaïs Lameche, as well as new member Sanne Karlsson. Sundstrand was not part of the reunion: Lameche claimed she was unable to participate in the reunion as she lived in the United States. However, Sundstrand claimed that she had wanted to participate, but was told "they did not want [her] included."

== Solo career (2005–present) ==
Since Play ended in 2005, Sundstrand was signed to Model Management Group (MMG) based in New York (the same agency her bandmate Rosanna Munter was signed). Sundstrand did some modeling for a while and even did some benefit fashion shows. However, in 2005 and 2006 Sundstrand performed around New York City with friend singer Chris Trousdale (who she previously worked with in Play).

Between 2005 and 2006, Sundstrand was back in the studio where she went to work recording her debut solo album. She recorded two solo songs, "Say It Again" and "Press Rewind" which she debuted during concerts with Trousdale. In 2006, the duo recorded a duet titled "If Only" which they recorded in Sweden. The music video for the song was released via their choreographer Claudia Swan's YouTube account a few years after they filmed it.

In 2008, Sundstrand moved from New York to Los Angeles, California, where she starred in two indie films. Gone Astray, which was filmed in 2008. It is a horror, thriller, and religious film about a group of teens who go on a trip to find their inner faith and end up getting terrorized. Sundstrand starrs as Tara Nigel along with her friend and bandmate Chris Trousdale and Kaila Amariah (The Biggest Fan). In 2009, Sundstrand along with Kaila and 7th Heaven actress Catherine Hicks starred the drama Split Second, which is about a girl who is trying to find out how a car accident that claimed her father's life happened. Sundstrand stars as a police officer named Cathy. Both films were directed by Kaila's father Michael Criscione. The films were scheduled for release sometime in 2010 but were put on hold.

In 2010, after moving back to New York, Sundstrand signed with DampCellar Music and released her debut solo single "Brand New Me" on iTunes. And, in February 2012 it was announced that Sundstrand was being represented by New York-based ColbyModels with which Sundstrand has worked closely for many years.

Currently, Sundstrand has moved back to Sweden where she is continuing with her solo music and writing a non-fiction book based on her life and her struggles as a child in the entertainment industry. In June 2018 Sundstrand announced that she has signed with a Sweden-based publishing company and that her book will be released worldwide in 2018. It has also been confirmed that she is working on new music. Sundstrand released her book "Du Är Utybtbar" in Sweden on 25 February 2020

== Personal life ==
Sundstrand has one older brother. Anna got engaged to her boyfriend in September 2025 and married her boyfriend in September 2026. Together they share one child, a daughter born in November 2022. In 2016, Sundstrand announced that she has been diagnosed with the autoimmune disorder called Addison's Disease.

== Filmography ==
- 2009 – Split Second – Officer Cathy
- TBD – Gone Astray – Tara Nigel

== Discography ==
Singles

- 2006 – "Say It Again"
- 2006 – "Press Rewind"
- 2006 – "If Only" (w/ Chris Trousdale)
- 2010 – "Brand New Me"
