= Play discography =

- Studio albums: 5
- Compilation albums: 1
- Singles: 11
- Video albums: 1
- Music videos: 10

The discography of Swedish girl group Play consists of five studio albums, one compilation album and eleven singles.

== Albums ==
=== Studio albums ===
List of studio albums, with selected chart positions and certifications
| Title | Album details | Peak chart positions | | | | Certifications |
| Title | Album details | SWE | FRA | US | US Heat. | Certifications |
|---|---|---|---|---|---|---|
| Us Against the World | Released: 12 December 2001; Formats: CD, digital download; Label: Columbia, Music World | — | 108 | 88 | 2 | RIAA: Gold |
| Replay | Released: 10 June 2003; Format: CD, digital download; Label: Columbia | — | — | 67 | — | |
| Don't Stop the Music | Released: 9 March 2004; Format: CD, digital download; Label: Columbia | — | — | — | — | |
| Play Around the Christmas Tree | Released: 23 November 2004; Format: CD, digital download; Label: Columbia | — | — | — | — | |
| Under My Skin | Released: 21 April 2010; Format: CD, digital download; Label: Bonnier Music | 7 | — | — | — | |
"—" denotes releases that did not chart or were not released in that territory.

=== Compilation albums ===
List of compilation albums
| Title | Album details |
|---|---|
| Playin' Around | Released: 28 January 2003; Format: CD, digital download; Label: Columbia |
| Girl's Mind | Released: 5 April 2005; Format: CD, digital download; Label: Columbia |

== Extended plays ==
List of EPs, with selected chart positions
| Title | EP details | Peak |
| Title | EP details | US |
|---|---|---|
| Play EP | Released: 25 June 2002; Label: Columbia, Music World; Format: CD, digital download | 74 |

== Singles ==
List of singles, with selected chart positions, showing year released and album name
| Title | Year | Peak chart positions | | | | | | | Album |
| Title | Year | SWE | AUS | FRA | GER | GRE | POL | US Sales | Album |
|---|---|---|---|---|---|---|---|---|---|
| "Us Against the World" | 2001 | 14 | — | 41 | 55 | — | — | 10 | Us Against the World |
| "I'm Gonna Make You Love Me" (featuring Chris Trousdale) | 2002 | — | — | — | — | — | — | — | Us Against the World |
| "Cinderella" | 2002 | — | — | — | — | — | — | — | Us Against the World |
| "I Must Not Chase the Boys" | 2003 | — | 52 | — | — | 14 | — | — | Replay |
| "Whole Again" | 2003 | — | — | — | — | — | — | — | Replay |
| "It's the Hard Knock Life" | 2004 | — | — | — | — | — | — | — | Don't Stop the Music |
| "everGirl" | 2004 | — | — | — | — | — | — | — | Don't Stop the Music |
| "Every Little Step" (featuring Aaron Carter) | 2004 | — | — | — | — | — | — | — | Don't Stop the Music |
| "Famous" | 2010 | 1 | — | — | — | — | 5 | — | Under My Skin |
| "Not the One" | 2010 | — | — | — | — | — | — | — | Under My Skin |
"—" denotes releases that did not chart or were not released in that territory.

== Other appearances ==
| Title | Year | Other artist(s) | Album |
|---|---|---|---|
| "I'm Gonna Make You Love Me" | 2002 | Chris Trousdale | The Biggest Fan |
| "California" | 2002 | French Release | |
| "As Long as There's Christmas" | —N/a | Radio Disney Holiday Jams 2 | |
| "Destiny" | 2010 | —N/a | Avalon High |

== Videography ==
=== Video albums ===
List of albums
| Title | Album details |
|---|---|
| Us Against the World / About Play | Released: 25 June 2002; Format: DVD, digital download; Label: Columbia |
| Playin' Around | Released: 28 January 2003; Format: DVD, digital download; Label: Columbia |

=== Music videos ===
List of music videos, showing year released and director
| Title | Year | Director(s) |
|---|---|---|
| "Us Against the World" | 2002 | Stephen Scott |
| "I'm Gonna Make You Love Me" | 2002 | Sasha Levinson |
| "Cinderella" | 2002 | Unknown |
| "M.A.S.T.E.R. Pt. 2" | 2002 | Unknown |
| "As Long as There's Christmas" | 2002 | Brandon Dickerson |
| "I Must Not Chase the Boys" | 2003 | Sasha Levinson |
| "Whole Again" | 2003 | Sasha Levinson |
| "It's the Hard Knock Life" | 2003 | Sasha Levinson |
| "everGirl" (Swedish version) | 2004 | Mike Sloat |
| "everGirl" (US version) | 2004 | Mike Sloat |
| "Famous" | 2010 | Unknown |
