= Here Comes the Night (disambiguation) =

Here Comes the Night may refer to:

- "Here Comes the Night", song written by Bert Berns, released by Them

== Music ==
- Here Comes the Night (radio show), a late-night radio show run by Donal Dineen

=== Albums ===
- Here Comes the Night (Barry Manilow album), and its title song (1982)
- Here Comes the Night (David Johansen album) (1981)

=== Songs ===
- "Here Comes the Night" (The Beach Boys song) (1967)
- "Here Comes the Night", by The Walker Brothers (1967), written by Doc Pomus and Mort Shuman
- "Here Comes the Night", by Destroyer from This Night
- "Here Comes the Night", by Janis Ian
- "Here Comes the Night", by Kim Fransson from Kim
- "Here Comes the Night", by Nick Gilder
- "Here Comes the Night", by Tokio Hotel from 2001 (2022)

== See also ==
- "Here Comes the Knight", a song by Van Morrison from No Guru, No Method, No Teacher
- "Here Come the Nice", a single by Small Faces
