= Kim Fransson =

Swedish singer-songwriter

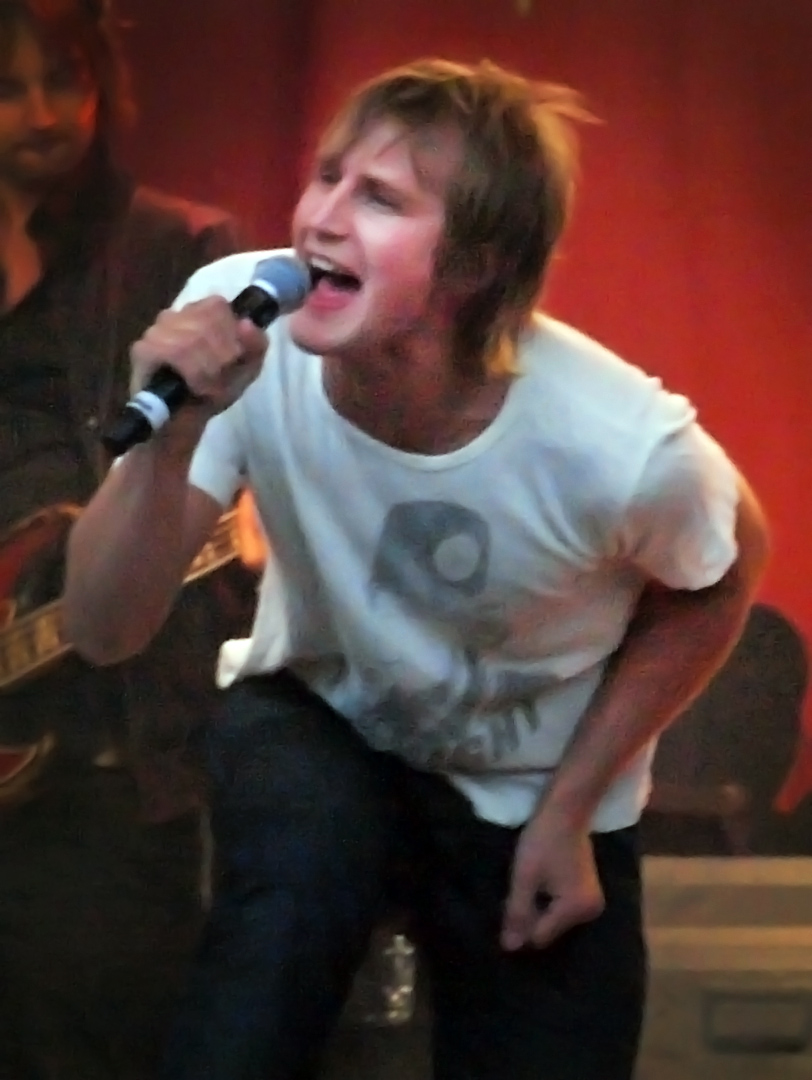

Background information
- Born: Kim Fransson; 7 June 1982 (age 44)
- Origin: Trollhättan, Sweden
- Genres: Pop
- Occupations: Singer, songwriter
- Instrument: Vocals
- Years active: 1994–present
- Website: Official Site

Kim Fransson (born 7 June 1982 in Trollhättan, Sweden), is a Swedish singer-songwriter, scoring Sverigetopplistan successes during 2009. He is particularly known for taking part in the first season of the series Made in Sweden, along with Janet Leon, where he collaborated with Anders Bagge, Laila Bagge, Andreas Carlsson for his debut album, also writing some of his own notable co-writing, such as "Here Comes the Night" with Fredrik Hallström.

Kim Fransson started his career at 12 when he appeared on Swedish TV4's program Nyårsgala. At the age of 13 he founded the bands "Kims Karusell, Swedish Chef and Shutlanger Sam" and won the talent contest Lejonrock in 2000. The band Shutlanger Sam was a "funk teen trio" managed by Dave Holland (drummer), the former drummer of metal superstars Judas Priest and recording studio owner Kevin Wilson. Shutlanger Sam played a show in Vänersborg in 1996 with Holland´s former Trapeze bandmate Glenn Hughes, and were introduced by Holland himself His brother Christian Fransson and cousin David Fransson are also known musicians in Division of Laura Lee.

In 2010, Fransson released a joint single with Robin Bengtsson on Merion Music.

== Discography ==
=== Album ===
- 2009: Kim

=== Singles ===
- 2009: "Here Comes the Night"
- 2009: "3 Floors Down" (reached No. 1 in Swedish Singles Chart)
