= Holiday in the Sun (film) =

2001 film by Steve Purcell

- DVD cover
- Directed by: Steve Purcell
- Written by: David T. Wagner; Brent Goldberg
- Produced by: Neil Steinberg; Natan Zahavi
- Starring: Mary-Kate and Ashley Olsen
- Cinematography: David Lewis
- Edited by: Sherwood Jones
- Music by: Steve Porcaro
- Production companies: Dualstar Entertainment Group; Tapestry Films
- Distributed by: Warner Home Video
- Release date: November 20, 2001
- Running time: 86 minutes
- Country: United States
- Language: English

Holiday in the Sun is a 2001 American direct-to-video romantic adventure family film directed by Steve Purcell and starring Mary-Kate and Ashley Olsen as two teenagers on vacation at Atlantis Paradise Island. The movie also stars Megan Fox in her film debut. Holiday in the Sun was produced by Dualstar Entertainment Group and Tapestry Films and released by Warner Home Video on November 20, 2001.

== Plot ==
Madison and Alex Stewart are twin sisters from Illinois who are whisked away to Atlantis Resort in The Bahamas by their parents for winter break. Initially, the sisters are disappointed that they didn't get to go to Hawaii with their friends, but overcome it by enjoying their newly earned freedom in the form of their own suite, as well as the pristine beaches of the Caribbean. Alex falls for "hottie" Jordan, a worker at the resort. She's not the only one with her eye on Jordan – the spoiled heiress, Brianna Wallace is also in love with him, and plays dirty to get her way. Madison, meanwhile, is being wooed by cute, but brainless, Scott, who in turn is being coached behind the scenes by Griffen, a childhood friend of Madison's with a not-so-subtle crush, to talk to Madison and eventually get her under his thumb. The sisters' holiday of fun in the sun is interrupted when Jordan is blamed for allegedly fencing stolen antiquities. Griffen and the twins dodge their meanwhile suspicious parents to find and expose the real culprit, understanding the true meaning of sisterhood along with having a great vacation.

== Cast ==
- Ashley Olsen as Alex Stewart
- Mary-Kate Olsen as Madison Stewart
- Austin Nichols as Griffen Grayson
- Ben Easter as Jordan Landers
- Billy Aaron Brown as Scott
- Markus Flanigan as Harrison
- Jamie Rose as Judy
- Jeff Altman as Chad
- Wendy Schaal as Jill
- Ashley Hughes as Keegan
- Megan Fox as Brianna Wallace
- Ashley Kelly as Trish
- Sterling Rice as Carmen
- Phillip Sands as Ziggy
- C.J. Ansell as Good Looking Kid
- Ben Christian as Boy in Club
- Spencer Roberts as Surfer
- Jason Deveaux as Stan
- Ben J. Michaels as Jeffrey
- Gordon Mills as Teacher
- Chelera Bateman as Liz
- Cesar Alava as Champlaine
- Scott Adderley as Security Guard
- Tony Roberts as Policeman
- Dawn Forbs as Katherine
- Steve Purcell as Director
- Rob Lundsgaard as D.P.
- Dale Russell as Chauffeur
- Eric Davis as Carriage Driver
- Tenby Turner, Enith Hernandez and Chris Bruck as Bikini Models
- Brittany Galiano as herself on the beach (uncredited)
- Play as themselves
  - Anaïs Lameche as herself at the party (Uncredited)
  - Faye Hamlin as herself at the party (Uncredited)
  - Anna Sundstrand as herself at the party (Uncredited)
  - Rosie Munter as herself at the party (Uncredited)

*Billed as 'Megan Fox' in opening credits, and as 'Megan Denise Fox' in closing credits.

== Production ==
While working on Van Wilder, screenwriters David Wagner and Brent Goldberg were approached about writing a film for the Olsen twins. Wagner had previously been a writer's intern for the original Full House. Originally, the film was titled The Last Family Vacation.

Ben Easter was cast after the Olsen twins watched his audition. Initially, they thought he was 16, but he kept the role even after they found out about his real age, as he was about to turn 22 at the time. For the film, he had to take guitar lessons and diving lessons as well. Megan Fox was cast in her first role in this film, making this her acting debut.

The film was shot in Atlantis Paradise Island, a resort in the Bahamas.

== Reception ==
Barbara Shulgasser of Common Sense Media called it a "dopey vacation movie" and gave it 1 out of 5. Steve Rhodes of "Internet Reviews" wrote: "As a travelogue, as a video aquarium and, most of all, as a film for young preteen girls, the movie succeeds."
