= Bratz: Forever Diamondz =

Bratz: Forever Diamondz may refer to:

- Bratz: Forever Diamondz (film)
  - Bratz: Forever Diamondz Soundtrack
- Bratz: Forever Diamondz (video game)
