= Replay (Play album) =

Studio album by Play
- Released: 10 June 2003
- Genres: Pop; teen pop
- Length: 38:26
- Label: Columbia
- Producers: Pelle Ankarberg; Blaze Billions; Andreas Carlsson; Desmond Child; Jem Godfrey; Hitvision; Richie Jones; Bill Padley; Pam Sheyne; Twin; Ric Wake

Play chronology
Playin' Around (2003)	Replay (2003)	Don't Stop the Music (2004)

Singles from Replay
- 1. "I Must Not Chase the Boys" Released: 29 April 2003; 2. "Whole Again" Released: 8 July 2003

Replay is the second studio album by Swedish girl group Play, released on 10 June 2003. It contains covers from British artists such as Billie Piper, Liberty X and Atomic Kitten. The first single off the album was "I Must Not Chase the Boys". The album peaked at number 67 on the Billboard 200 chart.

== Critical reception ==
Professional ratings
Review scores
Source	Rating
AllMusic	2.5/5 stars

AllMusic editor Johnny Loftus noted that Replay "tries to embrace Play's own emerging sexuality in its lyricism and photography, but falls short with unimaginative arrangements that either haven't left the fluffy PG beats of the quartet's (recent) past, or too closely imitate the hot modern R&B of Aguilera and especially Destiny's Child." Billboard named "I Must Not Chase the Boys" 76th on their list of "100 Greatest Girl Group Songs of All Time."

== Track listing ==
Replay track listing
No.	Title	Writer(s)	Producer(s)	Length
1.	"I Must Not Chase the Boys"	Jem Godfrey; Bill Padley; Pam Sheyne	Godfrey; Padley; Sheyne	3:16
2.	"Honey to the Bee"	Jim Marr; Wendy Page	Godfrey; Padley	4:14
3.	"Just a Little"	Michelle Escoffery; George Hammond Hagan; John Hammond Hagan	Richie Jones; Ric Wake	3:56
4.	"Whole Again"	Godfrey; Stuart Kershaw; Andy McCluskey; Padley	Jones; Padley	3:04
5.	"Hot" (featuring Shaggy)	John Bryan; Escoffery	Blaze Billions	3:45
6.	"Girl's Mind"	Godfrey; Padley; Sheyne	Godfrey; Padley; Sheyne	2:27
7.	"What Is Love?"	Robyn Carlsson; Cutfather & Joe; Kara DioGuardi	Jones	3:44
8.	"11 Out of 10"	Pelle Ankarberg; Charlie Dore; Niclas Molinder; Joacim Persson	Ankarberg; Twin	3:46
9.	"Let's Get to the Love Part"	Chris Braide; Andreas Carlsson; Desmond Child	Carlsson; Child	3:31
10.	"2 Blocks Down"	Aleena; Mattias Lindblom; Anders Wollbeck	Hitvision	3:27
11.	"Ain't No Mountain High Enough"	Nickolas Ashford; Valerie Simpson	Hitvision	3:16
12.	"Unspeakable" (Target bonus track)	DioGuardi; Simon Ellis; Michelle Lewis		3:15
Total length:				38:26

== Personnel ==
- Faye Hamlin – lead vocals
- Anaïs Lameche – lead vocals
- Rosie Munter – backing vocals
- Anna Sundstrand – backing vocals

== Album trivia ==
Several songs on Replay are covers of the original versions by their respective artists:

- "Honey to the Bee" was originally sung and released as a single by British popstar Billie Piper.
- "Just A Little" was originally written with slightly more suggestive lyrics and performed by the British-Irish group Liberty X.
- Both Play and American-British girl group No Secrets recorded "Whole Again" in late 2002 - but it was originally a hit for British girl group Atomic Kitten just one year earlier.
- Play was one of many artists to record their version of the classic "Ain't No Mountain High Enough," which was originally performed in 1967 by Marvin Gaye and Tammi Terrell.

Other songs on the album were later covered by other artists:

- Play was the first to record "What Is Love," but actress-singer Raven-Symoné covered this song for her 2004 album This Is My Time, it was also covered by British singer Peter Andre for his 2004 album The Long Road Back.
- Tata Young covered Play's song "I Must Not Chase The Boys" in her 2006 album Temperature Rising
- The German singer, Joana Zimmer, covered "Let's Get To The Love Part" for her second album, The Voice In Me.
- "2 Blocks Down" was used to write a Korean group Girls' Generation's song in their debut single "Beginning".
- "11 Out of 10" was later covered by the pop German group No Angels.
- The Belgian singer, Natalia, covered "Unspeakable" in her 2004 album Back for More.

== Charts ==
Weekly chart performance for Replay
Chart (2003)	Peak position
US Billboard 200	67
