= Made in Sweden =

Made in Sweden may refer to:

- Made in Sweden (album), an album by E-Type
- Made in Sweden (band), a Swedish band
- Made in Sweden (film), a 1969 Swedish film
- Made in Sweden (TV program), a Swedish television program
