= Don't Stop the Music (Play album) =

Studio album by Play
- Released: 9 March 2004
- Recorded: 2003–2004
- Genre: Pop; teen pop
- Length: 33:19
- Label: Columbia

Play chronology
Replay (2003)	Don't Stop the Music (2004)	Play Around the Christmas Tree (2004)

Singles from Don't Stop the Music
- 1. "It's the Hard Knock Life" Released: 7 November 2003; 2. "everGirl" Released: 24 February 2004; 3. "Every Little Step" Released: 2004

Don't Stop the Music is the third album of the Swedish girlband Play. It is the first album by the group to feature vocals from then new member Janet Leon, who replaced founding member and lead singer Faye Hamlin. In fact, many of the album's tracks are believed to have been originally recorded with Hamlin, as a year later an alternative version of Another Love Story was released featuring her vocals. The album was released on 9 March 2004. This was the group's least successful album and did not chart on the Billboard 200.

== Track listing ==
No.	Title	Writer(s)	Producer(s)	Length
1.	"everGirl"	Chuck Giscombe, Michael Mavrolas	Hitvision	2:47
2.	"Don't Stop the Music"	Robyn Carlsson, Alexander Kronlund, Johan Ekhé, Mikkel Sigvardt, Ulf Lindström	Peter Kvint	3:11
3.	"Every Little Step" (featuring Aaron Carter)	Kenneth Edmonds, Anthony Reid	Kvint, Danny O'Donoghue	3:31
4.	"Girls Can Too"	Jeremy Godfrey, Bill Padley, Tetsurō Oda	Godfrey, Padley	3:44
5.	"Hand in Hand"	Godfrey, Padley	Godfrey, Padley, Cool Cat Chris	3:37
6.	"You Found Me"	Carlsson, Billy Mann, Rasmus Bille Bähncke, René Tromborg	Mann, Ric Wake, Richie Jones, Bähncke, Tromberg	3:42
7.	"It's the Hard Knock Life"	Charles Strouse, Martin Charnin	Hitvision	3:13
8.	"Ain't No Mountain High Enough"	Nickolas Ashford, Valerie Simpson	Hitvision	3:12
9.	"Seven"	Kvint, Tim Lauer	Kvint	3:12
10.	"Another Love Story"	Michelle Escoffery, Damon Sharpe, Tim Woodcock	Wake, Jones, Cool Cat Chris	3:10

- There are several cover versions of previously recorded songs. The title track was originally recorded and released as a single by Swedish singer Robyn. "Every Little Step" was originally a track on Bobby Brown's 1988 album Don't Be Cruel. "Girls Can Too" is a reworked and reworded version of Nanase Aikawa's "Bye Bye" (later covered by Jennifer Ellison as "Bye Bye Boy"). "Ain't No Mountain High Enough", which also appeared on Replay featuring the vocals of former member Faye Hamlin, was originally performed by Marvin Gaye and Tammi Terrell.
- "It's the Hard Knock Life" was recorded two separate times – once with departing member Hamlin, and once with incoming member Janet Leon. Faye appeared in the video version, shot on behalf of the 20th Anniversary DVD release of Annie.
- Two music videos for "everGirl" were shot. The first was a more conventional video shot in a Swedish classroom, and the second was a tour diary/performance video filmed in a New York mall.
- In 2006, the song "Another Love Story" was featured in Dead or Alive Xtreme 2, for the Xbox 360, this song was originally recorded with departing member Faye Hamlin, it's rumored to have been an unreleased song from the group's second album Replay.

== Personnel ==
- Anaïs Lameche – lead vocals
- Janet Leon – lead vocals
- Rosie Munter – backing vocals
- Anna Sundstrand – backing vocals
