= Hello Laila =

Studio album by Laila
- Released: July 28, 1998
- Genre: R&B, dance
- Label: Motown
- Producer: George Jackson, Bruce Carbone

Laila chronology
Hello Laila (1998)	All About Love (2004)

Hello Laila is the debut album of R&B musician Laila. The album had one single, Here We Go Again, which sampled the beginning of the Emotions song Best of My Love and had echoes of Cheryl Lynn's "Got to Be Real".

== Track listing ==
1. Here We Go Again (Remix) – 2:45
2. It Ain't over 'Till We Say Goodbye – 3:50
3. Don't Go Breaking My Heart – 3:41
4. Say That You Love Me – 3:32
5. Forever Yours – 3:42
6. It's All About Love – 4:01
7. Heaven – 3:25
8. Lean on Me – 3:52
9. Shine on Me – 3:24
10. You Used to Be My Lover – 3:53
11. When the Love Is Right – 3:38
12. Here We Go Again – 2:51
