= Rock Angelz (soundtrack) =

Soundtrack album by Bratz
- Released: July 26, 2005
- Genre: Teen pop; rock; pop rock
- Length: 39:42
- Label: Hip-O
- Producer: Twin

Bratz chronology
Rock Angelz (2005)	Genie Magic (2006)

Singles from Rock Angelz
- 1. "So Good" Released: August 22, 2005

Rock Angelz is a soundtrack album to the 2005 direct-to-video film of the same name, which is based on the Bratz toyline. It was released on July 26, 2005, by Hip-O Records. The album had multiple promotional singles released.

== Singles ==
"So Good" was released as the first single from the album on August 22, 2005, in Australia. It was released in Germany on September 5.

== Track listing ==
No.	Title	Writer(s)	Producer(s)	Length
1.	"So Good"	Jörgen Elofsson; Andreas Carlsson; Ali Thomson	Twin	3:05
2.	"Change the World"	Matthew Gerrard; Bridget Benenate; Steve Booker	Twin	3:25
3.	"I Don't Care"	Niclas Molinder; Mikael Albertsson; Niklas Pettersson; Jim Dyke; Marnel Marc Nelkin	Twin	2:50
4.	"All About You"	Joacim Persson; Per Eklund; Tony Malm; Molinder	Twin	4:09
5.	"Who I Am"	Persson; Molinder; Pelle Ankarberg; Maryanne Morgan	Twin	3:09
6.	"So What"	Persson; Molinder; Ankarberg; Lisa Rachelle Greene	Twin	3:14
7.	"You Think"	Persson; Andrew Lane; D. Steven Thomas; Douglas Shawe	Twin	3:28
8.	"It Could Be Yours"	Markus Sepehrmanesh; Mats Jansson; Robert Habolin	Twin	2:59
9.	"Lookin' Good"	Persson; Molinder; Ankarberg; Morgan; Cheryl Parker; Sara Eker	Twin	3:35
10.	"Rock the World"	Molinder; Albertsson; Pettersson; Vincent DeGiorgio	Twin	2:51
11.	"Stand Out"	Gerrard; Robbie Nevil	Twin	3:01
12.	"Nobody's Girl"	Mitch Hunt	Twin	3:56
Total length:				39:42

US bonus track
No.	Title	Writer(s)	Producer(s)	Length
13.	"Se Siente" (So Good – Spanish version)	Elofsson; Carlsson; Thomson	Twin	3:02
Total length:				42:44

International bonus track
No.	Title	Writer(s)	Producer(s)	Length
13.	"Hey (When the Angelz Play)"	Persson; Molinder; Ankarberg; Kerima Holm	Twin	3:17
Total length:				42:59

UK bonus track
No.	Title	Length
14.	"Grow Up – Blah Blah Blah"	3:03
Total length:		46:02

=== B-sides ===
No.	Title	Writer(s)	Producer(s)	Length
1.	"Sparkle & Shine" (So Good)	Persson; Molinder; Ankarberg; Morgan; Elofsson	Twin	3:04
2.	"Girls Night Out" (So Good)			3:04
Total length:				6:08

Rush

== Personnel ==
This information is from Genius.

- Mikael Albertsson – songwriter
- Pelle Ankarberg – background vocalist
- Bridget Benenate – composer, songwriter
- Geo Bokestad – a&r, executive producer
- Steve Booker – songwriter
- Andreas Carlsson – songwriter
- Danne Carlsson – bass guitarist
- Vincent DeGiorgio – songwriter
- Jim Dyke – composer, songwriter
- Boba “Fat” Dylan – drummer
- Sara Eker – songwriter
- Per Eklund – songwriter
- Jörgen Elofsson – songwriter
- Matthew Gerrard – composer, songwriter
- Lisa Greene – songwriter
- Robert Habolin – songwriter
- Kerima Holm – background vocalist
- Horse (band) – audio producer, engineer, mixing engineer
- Fredrik Hult – bassist, bass guitarist, engineer, guitarist, mixing engineer, producer
- Mitch Hunt – songwriter
- Mats Jansson – songwriter
- Fredrik Landh – bassist, bass guitarist
- A. Lane – composer
- Andrew Lane – songwriter
- Isaac Larian – executive producer
- Ola Larsson – engineer, keyboardist, mixing engineer, producer
- Pat Lawrence – executive producer
- Janet Leon – background vocalist, main vocalist
- Linda Lindéh – background vocalist
- Johan Lindskoog – drum programmer
- Gavin Lurssen – mastering engineer
- Andy Malm – composer, engineer, producer
- Tony Malm – songwriter
- M. McCleary – songwriter
- Monique McGuffin – production coordinator
- Niclas Molinder – audio producer, engineer, mixing engineer, producer, songwriter
- Mary Anne Morgan – background vocalist, songwriter
- Marc Nelkin – composer, songwriter
- Robbie Nevil – songwriter
- Anna Nordell – background vocalist, main vocalist
- Mats Norrefalk – acoustic guitarist
- Clas Olfsson – guitarist
- Cheryl Parker – songwriter
- Joacim Persson – audio producer, engineer, guitarist, mixing engineer, producer, songwriter
- Niklas Pettersson – songwriter
- Bruce Resnikoff – executive producer
- Ray Roc – producer, remixing engineer
- Markus Sepehrmanesh – songwriter
- Doug Shawe – engineer, mixing engineer, producer
- Deborah Siegel – producer
- D. Sime – songwriter
- Dana Smart – a&r
- Brandy D. Stevens – songwriter
- Peter Swartling – a&r, executive producer
- D. Steven Thomas – songwriter
- A.P. Thompson – composer
- Ali Thomson – songwriter
- Niko Valsamidis – acoustic guitarist, guitarist
- Vartan – art director

== Charts ==
Chart performance for Rock Angelz
Chart (2005)	Peak position
Australian Albums (ARIA)	22
Norwegian Albums (VG-lista)	25
Scottish Albums (OCC)	31
UK Albums (OCC)	42
US Billboard 200	79
US Billboard Kid Albums	1
US Billboard Soundtracks	2

== Release history ==
Region	Date	Format	Label	Ref.
United States	July 26, 2005	CD	Hip-O	
Canada	September 6, 2005	CD	Universal	
Germany	September 27, 2005	CD	Universal	
United Kingdom	October 10, 2005	CD	Universal	
