= Made in Sweden (TV program) =

Swedish television program

Made in Sweden is a Swedish television program produced by TV4 targeting music talents and helping them to create new musical projects. The program was broadcast for two seasons in 2009 and 2010 and was supervised by Swedish Idol series judges Anders Bagge, Andreas Carlsson and Laila Bagge. Made in Sweden was a company owned by the trio with the vision to find and coach talent on the difficult road to fame. Video clips were also distributed of music done for the show.

== 2009: Season 1 ==
The first season of Made in Sweden was in the spring of 2009 and went on for 4 episodes. The judges went out to find two musicians who would be involved in preparing an album. The two selected acts were Janet Leon and Kim Fransson.

Janet Leon had been in search of a solo career since breaking up from the band Play. During the debut series, Janet worked on an album with the judges of Idol and renowned producers Laila Bagge, Anders Bagge and Andreas Carlsson. On 30 January 2009, Janet's debut solo album (resulting from the series) reached #3 on the Swedish Albums Chart.

As for Kim Fransson, during the program, he was shown assembling materials for a future album, cooperating with the judges and working with Desmond Child for a track on the album. The result was the self-titled album Kim with a track list including seven songs:

- "3 Floors Down" (K. Fransson, A. Bagge, F. Hallström, Andreas Carlsson)
- "Kiss and Make Up" (K. Fransson, A. Bagge, F. Hallström, Andreas Carlsson)
- "Let That Feeling Grow" (K. Fransson, F. Hallström, Andreas Carlsson)
- "The Hardest Lesson" (D. Child, A. Carlsson, K. Fransson, A. Bagge)
- "Another State of Mind" (K. Fransson, F. Hallström, Andreas Carlsson)
- "Man in the Moon" (K. Fransson, F. Hallström)
- "Here Comes the Night" (K. Fransson, A. Bagge, F. Hallström, Andreas Carlsson)

== 2010: Season 2 ==
In the second season in 2010, the judges tried to reunite the Swedish pop group Play to record a single and an album. Laila Bagge has been Play's previous manager and Janet Leon from season 1 had been a previous member of Play. Three members from the original Play line-up were due to take part: Faye Hamlin, Anaïs Lameche and Rosanna "Rosie" Munter, but Rosie dropped out two weeks before filming, meaning Play had to search for a new member in their limited time. After a long search, their demo recorder for one of their songs, Sanne Karlsson, came in and Laila and Anders both thought she was right for the job. She joined the band and the cameras followed Play in their journey to get back in shape for the music industry. There was a lot of discussion on whether to choose "Girls" or "Famous" (Made in Sweden's original title tune) as the Play's new single, but in the end, "Famous" was chosen, as they thought it would most likely reach the music charts. It peaked at #1 in Sweden, and their electro-pop themed album Under My Skin reached #7 in Sweden. The season also comprised just four episodes.
