= Heartstrings (Janet Leon song) =

Single by Janet Leon
- Released: February 16, 2013
- Recorded: 2013
- Genre: Dance, pop
- Length: 3:03
- Songwriter(s): Janet Ava Leon, Fredrik Kempe, Anton Malmberg Hård af Segerstad

Janet Leon singles chronology
| "Heartache on the Dance Floor" (2009) | "Heartstrings (Janet Leon song)" (2013) | "New Colours" (2013) |

"Heartstrings" is a song by Swedish singer Janet Leon. After Janet was officially confirmed as an contestant for Sweden's Melodifestivalen songwriting competition. Leon performed the song, written by Fredrik Kempe and Anton Malmberg Hård af Segerstad, in third heat of the competition in Skellefteå on 16 February 2013. Janet placed in fifth in the semi-finals and did not qualify for the next round. The song charted 36 on the Swedish charts.

== Charts ==
| Chart (2013) | Peak position |
|---|---|
| Sweden (Sverigetopplistan) | 36 |
