= Play Around the Christmas Tree =

Studio album by Play
- Released: 23 November 2004
- Recorded: October 2004
- Studio: Zoo Studios; Stockholm, Sweden
- Genre: Christmas
- Length: 27:16
- Label: Columbia

Play chronology
Don't Stop the Music (2004)	Play Around the Christmas Tree (2004)	Girl's Mind (2005)

Professional ratings
Review scores
Source	Rating
AllMusic	3/5 stars

Play Around the Christmas Tree is a 2004 album by the Swedish singing group Play. The album was rated 3 stars out of 5 by Johnny Loftus in AllMusic, praising the band's vocals but panning its instrumentation.

== Track listing ==
1. "Sleigh Ride" – 3:24
2. "Winter Wonderland" – 2:03
3. "O Holy Night" – 3:38
4. "Let It Snow" – 1:48
5. "Rudolph the Red Nosed Reindeer" – 1:54
6. "Silver Bells" –2:10
7. "Rockin' Around the Christmas Tree" – 2:07
8. "The Christmas Song" – 3:13
9. "All I Want for Christmas Is You" – 3:55
10. "Silent Night" – 3:04

== Personnel ==
- Anaïs Lameche – lead vocals
- Janet Leon – lead vocals
- Rosie Munter – backing vocals
- Anna Sundstrand – backing vocals
