= It's the Hard Knock Life =

Song by Annie and Orphans
- Published: 1977
- Composer: Charles Strouse
- Lyricist: Martin Charnin

"It's the Hard Knock Life" is a song from the musical Annie with music by Charles Strouse and lyrics by Martin Charnin. The song is sung by the eponymous protagonist, together with her fellow orphan girls, and is about how the girls are mistreated by Miss Hannigan.

In the 2014 film adaptation, the lyrics "No one cares for you a smidge, when you're in an orphanage" were changed to "no one cares for you a bit, when you're a foster kid". Additionally, the line "You'll stay up 'til this dump shines like the top of the Chrysler building" was changed to "Make my bathroom shine, but don't touch my medicine cabinet".

== Cover versions ==
- The song is sampled in the Jay-Z song "Hard Knock Life (Ghetto Anthem)". The Jay-Z version is parodied in the 2002 film Austin Powers in Goldmember.
- The song is sampled in the Lil' Romeo track "We Can Make It Right" from his second album Game Time.
- Play covered the song in 2004 for their third studio album Don't Stop the Music which was later featured on the 20th Anniversary DVD release of Annie.
- The song is interpolated in the chorus of Lukas Graham's 2014 single "Mama Said".
