= Famous (Play song) =

2010 single by Play

Single by Play

from the album Under My Skin
- Released: 15 February 2010
- Recorded: 2009
- Genre: Electropop; dance-rock
- Length: 2:52
- Label: Bonnier Amigo
- Songwriter(s): Andreas Carlsson; Desmond Child
- Producer(s): Alexander Almonte; Marcus Englöf

Play singles chronology
"everGirl" (2004)	"Famous" (2010)	"Not the One" (2010)

Music video
- "Famous" on YouTube

"Famous" is an English language hit by Swedish girl group Play, taken from the album Under My Skin (released on 21 April 2010). It is the only number-one single for the group on the Swedish Singles Chart, and their only top 10 hit since Play began in 2001.

The song was released as a one-track digital download on 15 February 2010, while on 16 February it was released as a two-track CD single including the song "Girls" as a B-side. It debuted on the Swedish Singles Chart for the week ending 19 February 2010 at number five, reaching number one the following week and staying there for one week. After five consecutive weeks on the chart, it left for one week before returning for two more, giving it a seven-week run.

== Background ==
In late 2009, as part of the Swedish television program Made in Sweden, the show's judges tried to reunite the Swedish pop group Play which split up in 2005. Three members from the original group were due to take part: Fanny Hamlin, Anaïs Lameche and Rosanna Munter, but Rosanna dropped out two weeks prior to filming. After a search for a third member, Sanne Karlsson, a demo recorder for one of their songs, was chosen. She joined the band and the cameras followed the group throughout the four-episode program in their journey to get back in shape for the music industry. By the last episode of the show on 11 February 2010, "Famous", the show's theme song, was announced as the group's first single since 2004.

== Track listing ==
Digital download

1. "Famous" (Radio Version) – 2:52

CD single

1. "Famous" – 2:52
2. "Girls" – 3:12

== Release history ==
Country	Date	Format	Label
Sweden	15 February 2010	Digital download	Bonnier Music
Sweden	16 February 2010	CD single	Bonnier Music

== Charts ==
Chart performance for "Famous"
Chart (2010)	Peak position
Sweden (Sverigetopplistan)	1

== Big Time Rush version ==
"Famous"

Promotional single by Big Time Rush

from the album BTR
- Released: 29 June 2010
- Recorded: 2009
- Genre: Pop rock, power pop
- Length: 3:06
- Label: Nickelodeon; Columbia
- Songwriter(s): Andreas Carlsson; Desmond Child
- Producer(s): Alex Papaconstantinou; Andreas Carlsson; Desmond Child; Marcus Englof

Music video
- "Famous" on YouTube

"Famous" was recorded by American pop group Big Time Rush from the international version of their debut studio album BTR. It was also included in the Best of Season 1 extended play. The song was released on 29 June 2010 as second promotional single from the soundtrack. Commercially, the song only lasted one week on the Bubbling Under Hot 100 chart and Heatseekers Songs chart.

=== Background ===
The song was played in its entirety for the first time immediately following the debut of the episode "Big Time Fever" on 26 June 2010. It was released onto iTunes on 29 June 2010, as a digital-only promotional single. James Maslow spoke about song stating, "You're asking someone, 'Do you really want to be there?'. We're just starting to realize that it is an amazing opportunity but it also means you have less privacy."

=== Music video ===
The music video was released on 25 June 2010 and was recorded in both a studio and at a concert held in Times Square on 10 June 2010.

=== Charts ===
Weekly chart performance for "Famous"
Chart (2010)	Peak position
Lithuania (European Hit Radio)	55
US Bubbling Under Hot 100 Singles (Billboard)	19
US Heatseeker Songs (Billboard)	18
US Kid Digital Song Sales (Billboard)	12
US Pop Digital Song Sales (Billboard)	42
