= Kim (album) =

Studio album by Kim Fransson
- Released: early 2009
- Genre: pop, rock
- Length: 26 minutes
- Label: Sony BMG Entertainment
- Producer: Marcus Englof, Alex Papaconstantinou

Kim is Kim Fransson's debut studio album, released in 2009.

== Track listing ==
1. 3 Floors Down (K. Fransson, A. Bagge, F. Hallström, Andreas Carlsson)
2. Kiss And Make Up (K. Fransson, A. Bagge, F. Hallström, Andreas Carlsson)
3. Let That Feeling Grow (K. Fransson, F. Hallström, Andreas Carlsson)
4. The Hardest Lesson (D. Child, A. Carlsson, K. Fransson, A. Bagge)
5. Another State of Mind (K. Fransson, F. Hallström, Andreas Carlsson)
6. Man in the Moon (K. Fransson, F. Hallström)
7. Here Comes the Night (K. Fransson, A. Bagge, F. Hallström, Andreas Carlsson)

== Chart positions ==
Chart (2009)	Peak position
Sweden (Sverigetopplistan)	14
