= Bratz discography =

Bratz
- Also known as: Bratzillaz
- Origin: U.S.
- Genres: Pop; R&B; pop rock; teen pop
- Years active: 2003–2008, 2013, 2022, 2023, 2025
- Labels: Hip-O; Geffen; Sony BMG
- Past members: Cloe; Jade; Sasha; Yasmin; (see List of Bratz characters for other members)
- Website: bratz.com

Bratz discography
- Extended plays: 1
- Soundtrack albums: 6
- Compilation albums: 3
- Singles: 6
- Music videos: 3

The Bratz franchise's virtual band released six soundtrack albums, three compilation albums, one extended play, four singles and three music videos.

Their debut single, "Show Me What You Got" featuring BoA and Howie D. of the Backstreet Boys, was released in August 2003. The song was accompanied by two B-sides: "Can U Feel the Beat" and "Distance". It was followed by the release of "Look Around", featuring Christina Milian and Verbal, in November 2003. Both "Show Me What You Got" and "Look Around" were released by Avex Trax exclusively for the Japanese market.

In July 2005 their first soundtrack album, Rock Angelz, was released by Hip-O Records. The album peaked at number 79 on the Billboard 200, becoming their highest charting album in the United States. It also reached the top 30 in Australia and Norway, the top 40 in Scotland, and the top 50 in the United Kingdom. The album produced the hit single "So Good", which peaked at number 5 in Norway, 14 in Australia and in the top 30 in New Zealand and the United Kingdom. The song was nominated for a Daytime Emmy Award in 2007 for Outstanding Original Song for a Children's Animated Show.

Their second soundtrack album, Genie Magic, was released in April 2006. It was less successful than its predecessor, peaking at 106 in the United States, and failing to chart internationally. Forever Diamondz followed in September 2006 and managed to peak at number 40 in Australia and 184 in the United States. Their fourth soundtrack album, Fashion Pixiez, was released in February 2007 and peaked at number 166 in the United States. This was followed by the release of Bratz: Motion Picture Soundtrack in July 2007, which peaked at number 83 in the United States. Their sixth and final soundtrack album, Girlz Really Rock, was released in July 2008 and failed to chart on any national charts. Two compilation albums, Bratz Girlz and Bratz Girlz 2, were released under the Bratz banner in December 2007 and December 2008. They peaked at number 19 and 21 on the UK Compilation Chart, respectively, and the former was certified silver by the British Phonographic Industry (BPI).

== Albums ==
=== Soundtrack albums ===
List of soundtrack albums, with selected chart positions
Title	Album details	Peak chart positions				
Title	Album details	US	AUS	NO	SCO	UK
Rock Angelz	Released: July 26, 2005; Label: Hip-O; Formats: CD, digital download	79	22	25	31	42
Genie Magic	Released: April 18, 2006; Label: Hip-O; Format: CD	106	67	—	—	—
Forever Diamondz	Released: September 19, 2006; Label: Hip-O; Formats: CD, digital download	184	40	—	—	—
Fashion Pixiez	Released: February 20, 2007; Label: Hip-O; Format: CD	166	81	—	—	—
Bratz: Motion Picture Soundtrack	Released: July 31, 2007; Label: Geffen; Formats: CD, digital download	83	99	—	—	—
Girlz Really Rock	Released: July 22, 2008; Label: MGA; Format: CD	—	—	—	—	—
"—" denotes a title that did not chart or was not released in that territory.

=== Compilation albums ===
List of compilation albums, with selected chart positions and certifications
Title	Album details	Peak chart positions	Certifications
Title	Album details	UK	Certifications
Bratz Girlz	Released: December 4, 2007; Label: Sony BMG; Format: CD	— (Note: Bratz Girlz did not chart on the UK Albums Chart, but peaked at number 19 on the UK Compilation Chart.)	BPI: Silver
Girlz Really Rock with Friends	Released: September 30, 2008; Label: Sony BMG; Format: CD	—	
Bratz Girlz 2	Released: December 2, 2008; Label: Sony BMG; Format: CD	— (Note: Bratz Girlz 2 did not chart on the UK Albums Chart, but peaked at number 21 on the UK Compilation Chart.)	
Bratz Angelz	Release: January 30, 2026; Label: Sony BMG; Format: CD	—	
"—" denotes a title that did not chart or was not released in that territory.

=== Extended plays ===
List of extended plays
Title	Album details
Bratz: Music from the Motion Picture	Released: November 27, 2007; Label: Geffen; Format: CD

== Singles ==
List of singles, with selected chart positions
Title	Year	Peak chart positions				Album
Title	Year	AUS	NO	NZ	UK	Album
"Show Me What You Got" (featuring BoA and Howie D.)	2003	—	—	—	—	Non-album singles
"Look Around" (featuring Christina Milian and Verbal)	2003	—	—	—	—	Non-album singles
"So Good"	2005	14	5	21	23	Rock Angelz
"Glam Gets Wicked (Tonight)" (as Bratzillaz)	2013	—	—	—	—	Non-album single
"Bratz (Bratz Tv Mix)"	2022	—	—	—	—	Non-album single
"We're The Bratz"	2023	—	—	—	—	Non-album single
"Think About It"	2025	—	—	—	—	Bratz Angelz
"Dollz Doll"	2025	—	—	—	—	Bratz Angelz
"If I'm Being Honest"	2026	—	—	—	—	Bratz Angelz
"—" denotes a title that did not chart or was not released in that territory.

== Music videos ==
List of music videos, with director
Title	Year	Director
"Show Me What You Got"	2003	Kiyohisa Nakamura
"So Good"	2005	—N/a
"Bein' Who We Are"	2006	—N/a
