= Play (Swedish group) =

Swedish pop girl group

- Origin: Stockholm, Sweden
- Genres: Pop; teen pop
- Years active: 2000–2005; 2009–2011
- Labels: Columbia (2001–2005); Bonnier Music (2009–2010)
- Past members: Anaïs Lameche; Faye Hamlin; Emelie Norenberg; Rosie Munter; Sanne Karlsson; Anna Sundstrand; Janet Leon

Play was a Swedish pop girl group. Faye Hamlin, Anna Sundstrand, Anaïs Lameche, and Rosie Munter formed Play's original lineup from the band's formation from 2000 until late 2003. After founding member Hamlin left the group, fifth member Janet Leon joined Play to fill Hamlin's position as lead singer. In 2005, the group officially announced an "indefinite break" and split up. At that time, Play had sold almost one million albums. Four years later, in 2009, the group reformed with a new lineup of three members consisting of Lameche, Hamlin, and the sixth and oldest member of Play, Sanne Karlsson. In February 2011, an official statement was made that Hamlin had once again left the group in 2010 and would be replaced by Emelie Norenberg. It was announced in May 2011 that the band had separated for the second time.

== History ==
=== 2000–2002: Formation and Us Against the World ===
Play was formed in 2000 as a result of a nationwide talent search led by Laila Bagge, a recording artist and dance studio owner. Her original lineup for Play consisted of four girls. Two girls were discovered at her dance studio: eleven-year-old Anna Sundstrand and thirteen-year-old Anaïs Lameche, younger sister of recording artist Amanda Lameche. The other two girls were found in the audition process: thirteen-year-olds Faye Hamlin and Rosie Munter, the latter of which had also starred in the popular Swedish film called Eva & Adam: Fyra födelsedagar och ett fiasko. Hamlin and Munter had also been best friends before being selected to be in Play. Play's career was launched both in Sweden and in the United States in 2001 and 2002. Their first single and video, "Us Against the World", was released in Sweden on 11 September 2001. The song hit number 14 on the Sverigetopplistan chart, and was later certified Gold. The single was released in the United States in January 2002, it charted at number 10 on Billboard's Hot 100 Singles Sales chart and stayed on the chart for 65 weeks. The song also charted in France, and Germany. In Sweden, Play's first full-length English-language album, Us Against the World, was released on 12 December 2001. In the United States the album was released on 25 June 2002 and named as Play. In 2002, the group released the second single, "Cinderella".

Play toured in the United States in the coming months, opening for Aaron Carter and Destiny's Child. While touring in the USA, the group often partnered with the groups clothing chain Limited Too. Play's song "M.A.S.T.E.R. part 2", which features Lil' Fizz of B2K and lead vocals by Hamlin, was also featured in the 2002 film The Master of Disguise, for which they filmed a video with numerous well-known soundtrack contributing artists including Lil' Fizz, J-Boog, Jhené Aiko and Solange Knowles. Their hit song "Us Against the World" was featured in the film Holiday in the Sun, and also on the Lizzie McGuire series soundtrack. The group concluded 2002 with an appearance on the nationally televised Macy's Thanksgiving Day Parade where they stood atop the Build-a-Bear float and performed a rendition of "I'm Gonna Make You Love Me" which they had previously recorded with Chris Trousdale of Dream Street. The album peaked at number seventy-four on the Billboard 200 and was certified gold on 24 March 2003 for sales of 500,000 copies.

=== 2003–2004: Replay and second lineup ===
Play returned to the studio to begin recording their second album, Replay. Prior to the release of their second album, a DVD titled Playin' Around was released and featured several Play music videos, special "Making of" segments, footage from a live concert, and clips of the members from Play recording and preparing for their second album. Replay, a more mature and R&B-influenced effort, was released on 10 June 2003. On the day of release, Play made several appearances to promote the album, including a guest spot on popular daytime talk show Live with Regis and Kelly. During the Replay era, Hamlin emerged as the group's lead singer. The album debuted at number sixty-seven and managed to stay in the top 200 albums for seven weeks. The first single was "I Must Not Chase the Boys" and the music video made was aired on MTV's TRL and made the top 10 requested videos countdown. It also managed to be featured on Carson Daly's radio show as one of his picks of the week. The song was also used for a promo for the Nickelodeon cartoon My Life As a Teenage Robot. Play continued to tour in 2003 and they also appeared on several Nickelodeon television specials as featured guests and performers. The group also released the second and final single from Replay, a cover of Atomic Kitten's "Whole Again".

In October 2003, Play's lead singer, sixteen-year-old Hamlin, decided to leave Play to pursue a college education. Hamlin continued to make appearances with Play until December 2003, and appeared in Play's video "It's a Hard Knock Life" which was featured on a DVD re-release of the hit musical film Annie. On 15 December, a formal press release on the group's official site informed fans of the lineup change and introduced new member, Janet Leon, who would become Play's new lead singer along with Lameche.

=== 2004–2005: Don't Stop the Music, Play Around the Christmas Tree and split ===
In 2004, Play became affiliated with everGirl, a doll and fashion brand from Nickelodeon. The group recorded the everGirl theme song as well as a music video.

Play's third US album, Don't Stop the Music, was released on 9 March 2004. The first single, "Every Little Step", featured Aaron Carter and the second single was the everGirl theme song. This album was aimed more at a younger audience. The title track from the album Don't Stop the Music was originally written and recorded by Swedish singer Robyn. The album is one of Play's least successful albums, failing to chart on Billboard.

In November 2004, Play released their fourth US album, a Christmas collection entitled Play Around the Christmas Tree. The album also failed to chart on the Billboard 200, and is their other worst selling album. Little news of Play was heard until the release of their compilation album entitled Girl's Mind which was released in April 2005. The album features ten of Play's best-known songs, and all feature Hamlin's vocals. Play never came to the US to promote Girl's Mind, and it was not widely released in stores across the country. It was their third consecutive album also failing to chart on Billboard 200. After a long period of no activity, in September 2005 an official statement from the members of Play confirmed that they were on an indefinite break as a group. At that time, Play had sold almost one million albums.

=== 2009–2011: Reunion, Under My Skin and second split ===
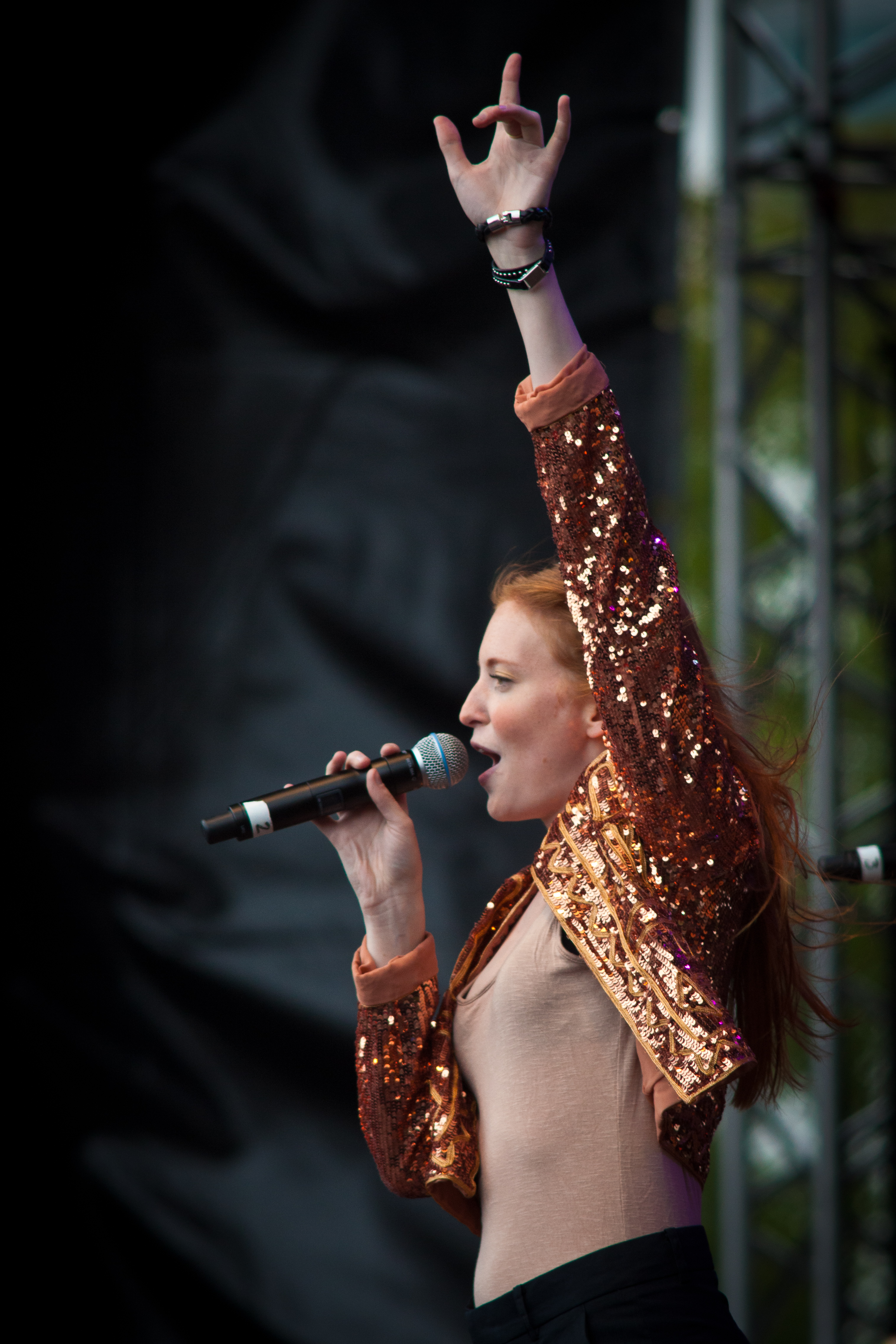
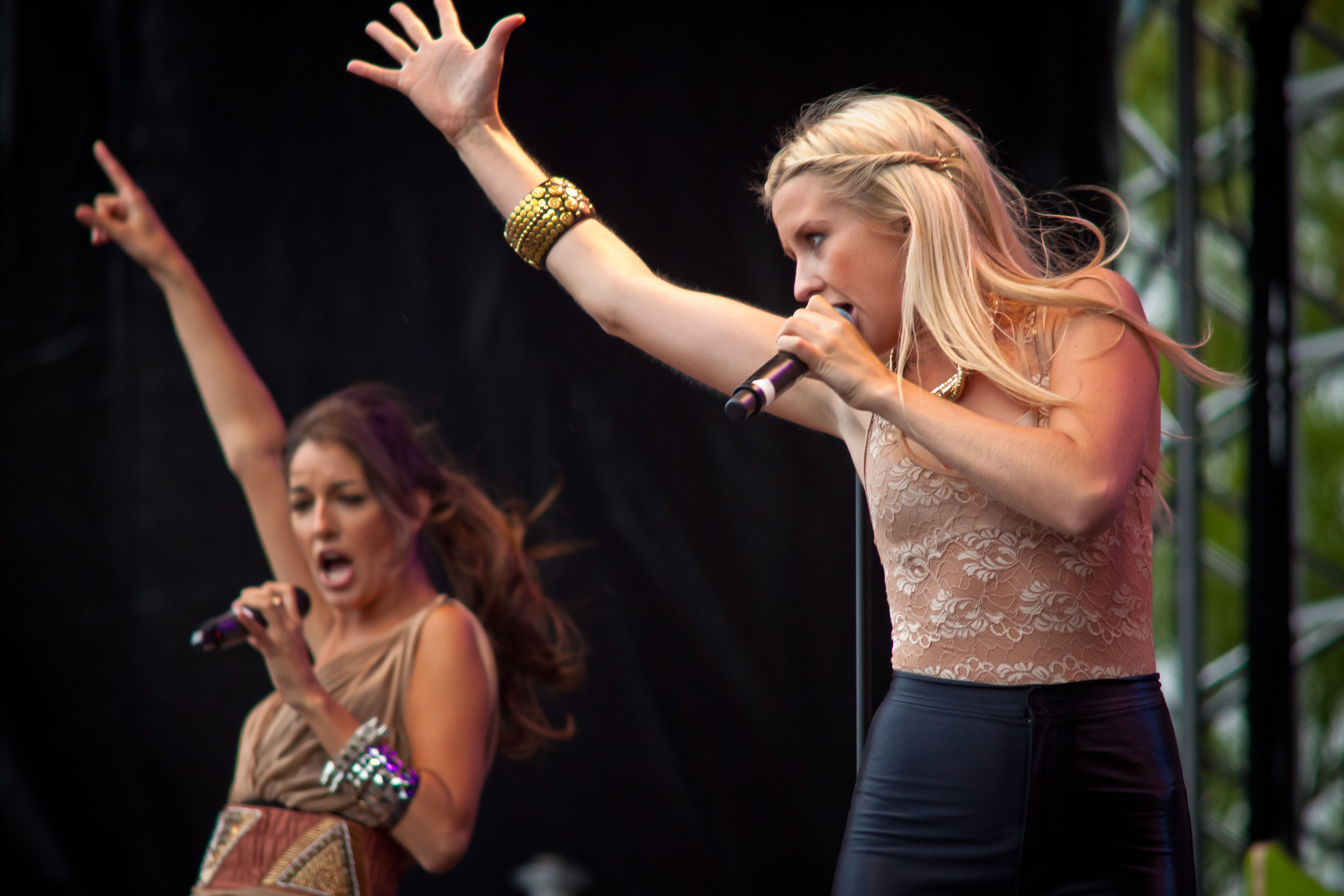
Faye Hamlin, Anaïs Lameche and Sanne Karlsson performing together in Malmö in July 2010.

On 26 November 2009, Hamlin and Lameche appeared on the Swedish radio stations NRJ and RIXFM, along with another singer named Sanne Karlsson. They then announced as a trio, they would return as "Play" and were to partake in the filming of reality show Made in Sweden just like former member Janet was. Sundstrand was not included in the reunion due to living in the United States. Munter was originally to be in the reunion, but dropped out three weeks before filming Made in Sweden in order to pursue a solo career as a singer/songwriter. This meant that Play had to find another member, which resulted in Karlsson joining the group. With the new lineup in place, Play recorded a full album in four weeks and on 27 November 2009, Play made their first public appearance in over 4 years since disbanding in 2005. Made In Sweden aired in December 2009, and followed the group searching for a new member, training, choosing and recording songs, recording the music video for "Famous" and following them on their journey to re-enter the music scene along with the Made In Sweden team: Andreas Carlsson, Anders Bagge and their old manager, Bagge. The reality programme consisted of four episodes. In 2009, Play was also a judge for the 8th annual Independent Music Awards to support independent artists' careers.

The lead single of their first studio album in six years was titled "Famous". It was the original theme tune for Made in Sweden the previous year, sung by Andreas Carlsson. There was some debate on whether to release "Famous" or "Girls" as the comeback single, but in the end "Famous" was chosen as the single. "Famous" debuted at number five, and in its next week peaked at number one. It became Play's only number one single of all time. It was later remade by Big Time Rush for their TV show on Nickelodeon. The group's new album, Under My Skin, was released on 21 April 2010. It debuted and peaked at number seven on the Swedish Albums Chart, making it their first album to chart in Sweden. In October, Play recorded a song called "Destiny" for the Disney Channel Original Movie Avalon High. However, just before the group were about to enter the studio to record the song, Hamlin called Bagge and told her that she had once again decided to leave the group. Hamlin's vocals are therefore not present in the song. It was also announced that Hamlin would not be joining Lameche and Karlsson for the promotion of the song. The song premiered on 26 October on Radio Disney. Hamlin had not been mentioned in the group's blog, nor seen with the others since late September, and some were doubting her place in the band. Multiple sources stated that Hamlin was writing and recording a solo album, and more pictures cropped of Hamlin on her own. Due to the search of a new member, Hamlin's decision to leave the group was not revealed to the public until February 2011, when Play announced that Emelie Norenberg, Karlsson's best friend, who knew many of the other former members, would become the newest member of Play. This left Lameche as the only original member of the group, and the only member to be in every incarnation of the group.

Lameche, Karlsson and Norenberg were planning a return to the United States and release an EP. However, on 23 May 2011, it was announced after a lack of news, that the plans that were made for the group would not happen and that the group had broken up for a second and final time. The band split up in early 2011. Moreover, it was later revealed through an official statement that the members were no longer on speaking terms for a variety of reasons. The reason was apparently due to the group not meeting after their trip to L.A. and some things were said about the commitment of some of the members. They have each since gone their separate ways both professionally and personally.

== Members ==
Member	2000	2001	2002	2003	2004	2005	2006	2007	2008	2009	2010	2011
Anaïs Lameche (2000–2005, 2009–2011)												
Faye Hamlin (2000–2003, 2009–2010)												
Anna Sundstrand (2000–2005)												
Rosie Munter (2000–2005)												
Janet Leon (2003–2005)												
Sanne Karlsson (2009–2011)												
Emelie Norenberg (2010–2011)												

== Discography ==
- Us Against the World (2001)
- Replay (2003)
- Don't Stop the Music (2004)
- Play Around the Christmas Tree (2004)
- Under My Skin (2010)
