= Anaïs Lameche =

Swedish singer

Anais Lameche
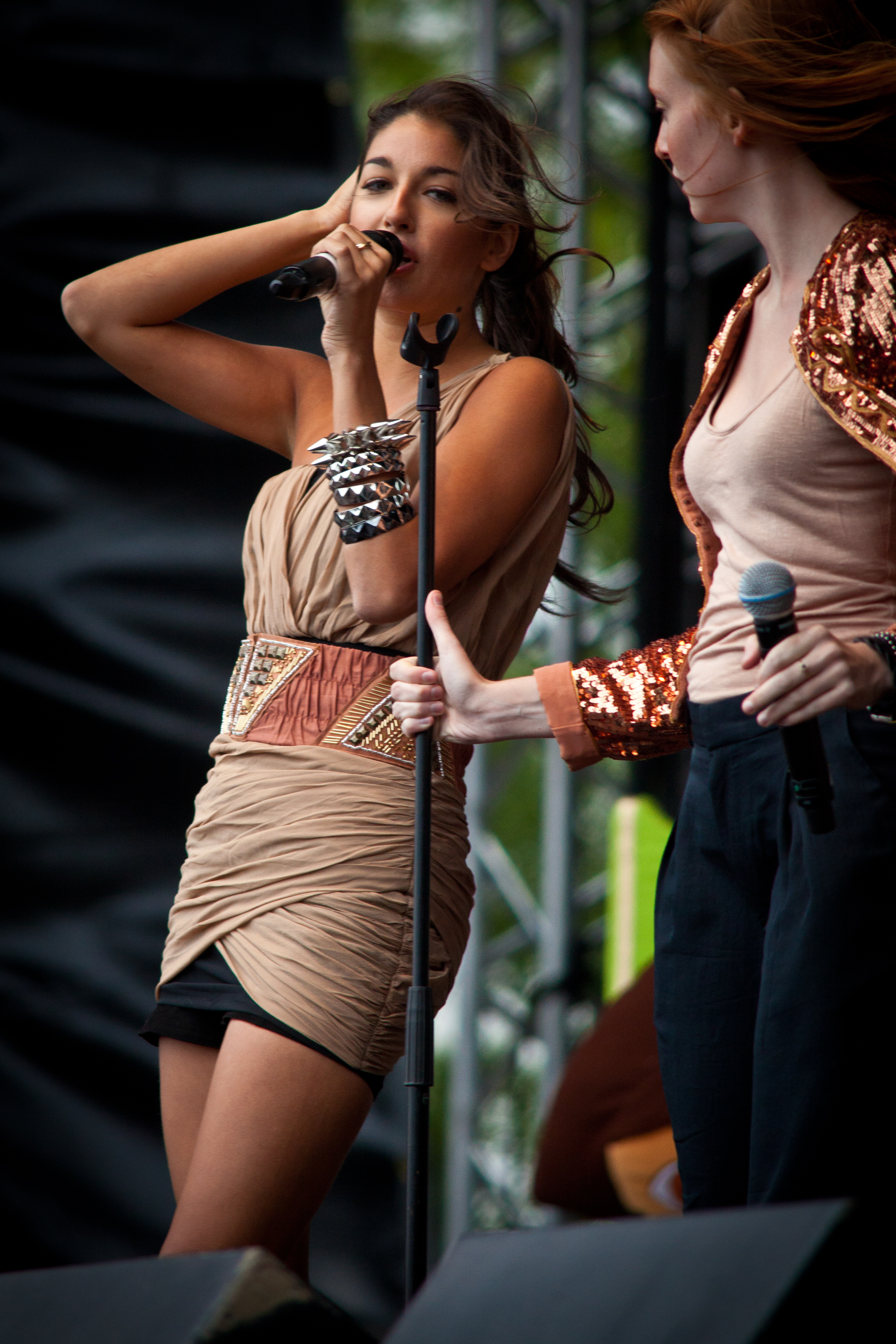
- Lameche performing with Play in 2010

Background information
- Born: Anaïs Helena Kretz Lameche; 19 August 1987 (age 39); French Alps, France
- Origin: Täby, Sweden
- Genres: Pop, dance
- Occupation: Singer
- Years active: 2000–2005, 2010–2011
- Labels: Sony BMG, Columbia, (Music World) (2001–2005)

Anaïs Helena Lameche Bonnier (née Kretz Lameche; born 19 August 1987) is a Swedish former singer and one of the original members of the Swedish pop group Play. She is the only member of Play out of its seven different members to appear in all four different line-ups of the group. Before the band's split, she was also the last remaining original member of the group since Faye's second departure in January 2011. She quit the music industry in 2011.

== Early life ==
Lameche was born in the French Alps. Her father is French. The family eventually moved back to Täby, Sweden, where Lameche's mother is from. She has an older sister, Amanda, who previously had a solo career as a singer. She has three younger half sisters and a younger half brother, following her parents' divorce.

== Music career: Play (2001–2005) ==
In 2001, Play's first single "Us Against the World" was featured on the Mary-Kate and Ashley Olsen movie Holiday In The Sun. "Us Against the World" was followed by "I'm Gonna Make You Love Me" a cover of a Diana Ross song. The song featured Chris Trousdale from Dream Street and received heavy rotation on Radio Disney.

Their first album dropped in 2001. Us Against the World included both singles plus 5 additional songs.

In 2003, Replay was released with 2 big hits "Whole Again" and "I Must Not Chase the Boys." It also featured another Diana Ross cover "Ain't No Mountain High Enough." After Replay's release, Faye Hamlin left the group to pursue education and modeling and was replaced by Janet Leon.

In 2004, Don't Stop the Music was released with the single being "everGirl" for a Nickelodeon series that was filmed but not greenlit. There was also a duet with Aaron Carter "Every Little Step." They also redid "Ain't No Mountain High" with Janet Leon.

In late 2004, the Christmas album Play Around the Christmas Tree was released. It has 10 of their favorite Christmas songs. It also was their last recorded album.

Anaïs was asked to join Play by the group's manager, Laila Bagge, who discovered Anaïs at her dancing school after the Lameche family settled in Näsbypark, Sweden. Anaïs' older sister, Amanda Lameche, had already worked with Laila Bagge and had released a pop record in the United States.

In Play, Anaïs sang alto harmonies and was considered to be one the Lead Vocalist. After the band's first split, Anaïs studied at the University of Stockholm and the University of Lund.

=== New lineup with Play and retirement from music (2009–2011) ===
In 2009, Lameche, along with Faye Hamlin and a new member, Sanne Karlsson, returned as Play, but as a trio. They were managed once more by Laila Bagge. They took part in Made in Sweden 2010, which documented their revival, search for a new third member, and recording and working on a new album. Their debut single from the album, "Famous", entered the Swedish music charts at No. 1. The group's fifth album and first with Sanne Karlsson, Under My Skin, was released in April 2010. It peaked in the Swedish music charts at No. 7. An EP and promotion in the US was expected, but plans were later shelved. In May 2011, the band announced their separation, and Lameche left the music industry.

== Personal life ==
Lameche speaks fluent French, Swedish and English. Her success with Play inspired friend and pop singer Tove Lo to pursue her own career in music. Following Play's first split, Lameche attended Stockholm University, where she studied fashion studies. At Lund University she studied art history. Since leaving the music industry, Lameche began a career in public relations in Stockholm. In 2011, she began working at Assefa Kommunikation, one of the leading public relations firms in Sweden. She currently works as a senior PR consultant for another Stockholm-based PR agency. She lives in Norrmalm, a district in Stockholm. Lameche and her longtime boyfriend of six years, Niklas, became engaged in 2014. They married in Sweden in August 2015. In July 2016, she announced her pregnancy with her first child. She gave birth to a baby girl in late December 2016. Due to her husband's job, she moved to New York City for several months in mid-2018. The family moved back to Stockholm in May 2019. She gave birth to her second child, a son, in July 2019. Her third child, also a son, was born in Sweden in July 2022.
