= EverGirl =

Children's lifestyle brand

everGirl is a discontinued product brand belonging to Viacom's Nickelodeon. It was aimed at the tween girl market and introduced in 2004. It was described as "a lifestyle brand specifically created for tween girls". All products include dolls, clothes, CDs, digital cameras, video games and a virtual community. The site has been on indefinite hiatus – "getting a makeover" – since 2006, and now redirects to Nick.com. Swedish pop girl group Play made and performed the site's theme music and they were also sponsors. A TV show based on the brand was rumored to be air on Nickelodeon, but it was not produced.
