= Amanda (singer) =

French-born Swedish pop singer (born 1985)

Amanda Lameche
- Born: Amanda Djamila Kretz Lameche; 24 March 1985 (age 40); French Alps, France
- Origin: Täby, Sweden
- Genres: Pop
- Years active: 2000–2002
- Labels: Maverick (2000–2001)

Amanda Djamila Kretz Lameche, known professionally as Amanda (born 24 March 1985), is a French-born Swedish pop singer who started her career in music after her family settled in Täby, Sweden. She was discovered at the age of 10 by the wife of Anders Bagge, who became one of her songwriters. Murlyn Songs became her producers.

Amanda became the first young female pop act to sign with Madonna's Maverick Records, making her professional debut with "You Don't Stand a Chance", from the Rugrats in Paris movie soundtrack. In 2000, Lameche recorded her debut album, entitled Everybody Doesn't, released in 2001. The title track "Everybody Doesn't" was her first and only single to date, peaking at #81 on the Billboard Hot 100. Before the release she embarked on a 40 city radio tour to promote her single.

Amanda's younger sister, Anaïs Lameche, is also a singer and is known for being a part of the successful group Play, which sold nearly one million albums.
