= Rosanna Munter =

Swedish actress and recording artist

Background information
- Also known as: Rosanna
- Born: Rosanna Bella Victoria Eriksdotter-Munter; 1987 (age 38–39)
- Genre: Pop
- Years active: 2000–present
- Label: Popjustice Hi-Fi
- Formerly of: Play (2001–2005) K.I.D.S. (2013–2015)

Rosanna Bella Victoria Eriksdotter Munter (born 1987) is an actress and recording artist from Sweden. She is best known as a member of the Swedish girl group Play, and she was in a collaborative project with White Lies bassist Charles Cave titled K.I.D.S.

She quit the music industry as a recording artist in 2015, but currently works as A&R at Universal Music in Stockholm. She founded and runs a music management company called Logic & Heart.

== Career ==
=== Early career ===
Munter's first introduction to stardom, prior to joining Play, was at the age of 12, with the supporting role of Petra in the successful Swedish film Eva & Adam – Fyra födelsedagar och ett fiasko, directed by Catti Edfeldt. The film was based on the popular Scandinavian sitcom Eva & Adam.

=== 2000–2005: Play ===
Munter was one of hundreds of teen girls who auditioned for a spot in Play, an all-girl pop group formed by Laila Bagge, Anders Bagge, and Andreas Karlsson in Stockholm, Sweden. While rehearsing at Laila Bagge's house, Tommy Mottola (who was speaking with Laila on the phone) overheard the group in the background. He was so impressed with their sound that he flew them to Los Angeles a few days later. After performing for label executives, Play was signed to Columbia Records.

In December 2001, Play released their first album entitled Us Against the World. The album peaked at number 74 on the Billboard Top 200 and their debut single, "Us Against the World", found success on Radio Disney and Nickelodeon. Play also made a cameo appearance in Mary-Kate and Ashley Olsen's movie Holiday in the Sun performing "Us Against the World". To promote the album, the group toured nearly non-stop for a year, opening for Destiny's Child, Aaron Carter, and touring with Chris Trousdale and A-Teens. Their song "Disco Hippie" was featured on a commercial for Build-A-Bear Workshop. In 2002, they recorded a song and later a filmed a video with Lil' Fizz, formerly of B2K, for the Master of Disguise film.

In 2003, the group released their second album titled Replay which debuted at number 67 on the Billboard Top 200, and remained on the chart for several weeks. The album's second single "I Must Not Chase the Boys" reached number 10 on MTV's TRL. The group later went on to perform "I Must Not Chase the Boys" on Live with Regis and Kelly. After nearly a year hiatus, it was officially reported in October 2003 that Faye had left the group, and was replaced by Janet Leon, a 13-year-old singer from Gothenburg.

The group's third album, Don't Stop the Music, was released in 2004. The group partnered with clothing brand Limited Too and became the official spokes models. Clothing and jewellery from the line was featured in the Swedish version of their music video for their single "everGirl". Limited Too used the song in commercials, and Play later toured various Limited Too stores across the U.S.. The following year, they released Play Around the Christmas Tree, and shortly after, a compilation of their singles was released on an album titled Girl's Mind. In late 2005, Play released an official statement on their website, stating that the girl's were going their "separate ways".

While in Play, Munter generally sang soprano harmonies and had occasional solos.

=== 2005–2010: solo career ===
After Play disbanded, Munter dabbled in modeling in New York City before moving back to Sweden. She enrolled in college and majored in Music.

In 2007, Munter partnered with Swedish artist and producer Kocky. She lent her vocals to Kocky's debut album Kingdom Came (released 2007). She is featured in three songs off the album: "My Grandma," "Be Part of It All," and "Tricks" – the latter being released as a single. The single "Tricks" was released 10 September 2007 and Munter also appeared in the song's music video.

Munter was once again featured heavily on Kocky's second album, Stadium Status, singing on four of the ten tracks. Featured on "We're Back," "4-ever Juvenile," and "Oh!" (which she co-wrote with Kocky). To promote the Stadium Status, Munter and Kocky performed on various Swedish television programs including the morning news show Nyhetsmorgon.

In 2009 Munter launched an official Myspace page and official website (both of which have been disbanded). She released several demo songs "The First Time", "Gameboy", "Heart Attack", "Tick Tock", "Under Attack", and "Flashing Lights". She posted a homemade music video for her song "Flashing Lights" on her Myspace page. By 2009 Munter was alternating between Stockholm and London pursuing her solo career and songwriting career. Munter signed with EMI Publishing as a songwriter in 2009. EMI Publishing later went on and became Sony/ATV Publishing and Munter continued working close with Sony/ATV for the next 6 years.

In 2010 Munter signed with U.K.-based label Popjustice Hi-Fi which worked out distribution with Virgin Records. On 22 August 2010 Munter released the single (and subsequent music video) "Waterfall", which was produced and co-written by Jim Eliot (Kylie, Ladyhawke). Popjustice Hi-Fi also made available for downloading a B-side titled "Runaway." Munter described her sound as "big emotional, chaotic, beautiful pop" while The Guardian has described her debut single "Waterfall" as "gorgeously gloomy sugar-pop" and "Sylvia Plath in American Apparel."

Throughout 2010 and 2011, Munter formed and performed with a DJ collective called XOXO with her friends Malin Cumzelius, Aino Neneh Jawo, and Caroline Hjelt. Jawo and Hjelt are best known as Icona Pop. They described themselves as "[b]est friends playing their favorite songs and whose constant goal is to make you euphoric and sweaty! Patti Smith and Stevie Nicks are household gods!"

=== 2013–2015: K.I.D.S. ===
Along with friend Charles Cave, Munter debuted a new collaborative project at South by Southwest in March 2013. Their performances at SXSW marked the first live performance for the duo. The debut was accompanied by a music video release of their song "Ragged Old Angels". According to the duo, they have finished recording an album and expect it to be released early 2014.

Nylon has described the band's sound as "dark-edged electro-pop" while Idolator has described their material as "rich and dramatic, avoiding overwrought theatricality thanks to an expert sense of sonic balance: driving bass grooves and moody, billowy synth textures underpin Rosanna’s sweetly inviting vocal melodies."

=== 2015–present ===
In early 2015 Munter started a management company called Logic & Heart and has since then worked with artists such as Icona Pop and Lune and producer/songwriter Elias Kapari.

In September 2017 Munter became engaged to her boyfriend and the couple married in August 2018. Munter gave birth to her first child, a daughter, in June 2021.

== Discography ==
=== Singles ===
- 2010: "Waterfall"

=== As featured artist ===
- 2007: "Tricks" with Kocky
