= Janet Leon =

Swedish singer-songwriter (born 1990)

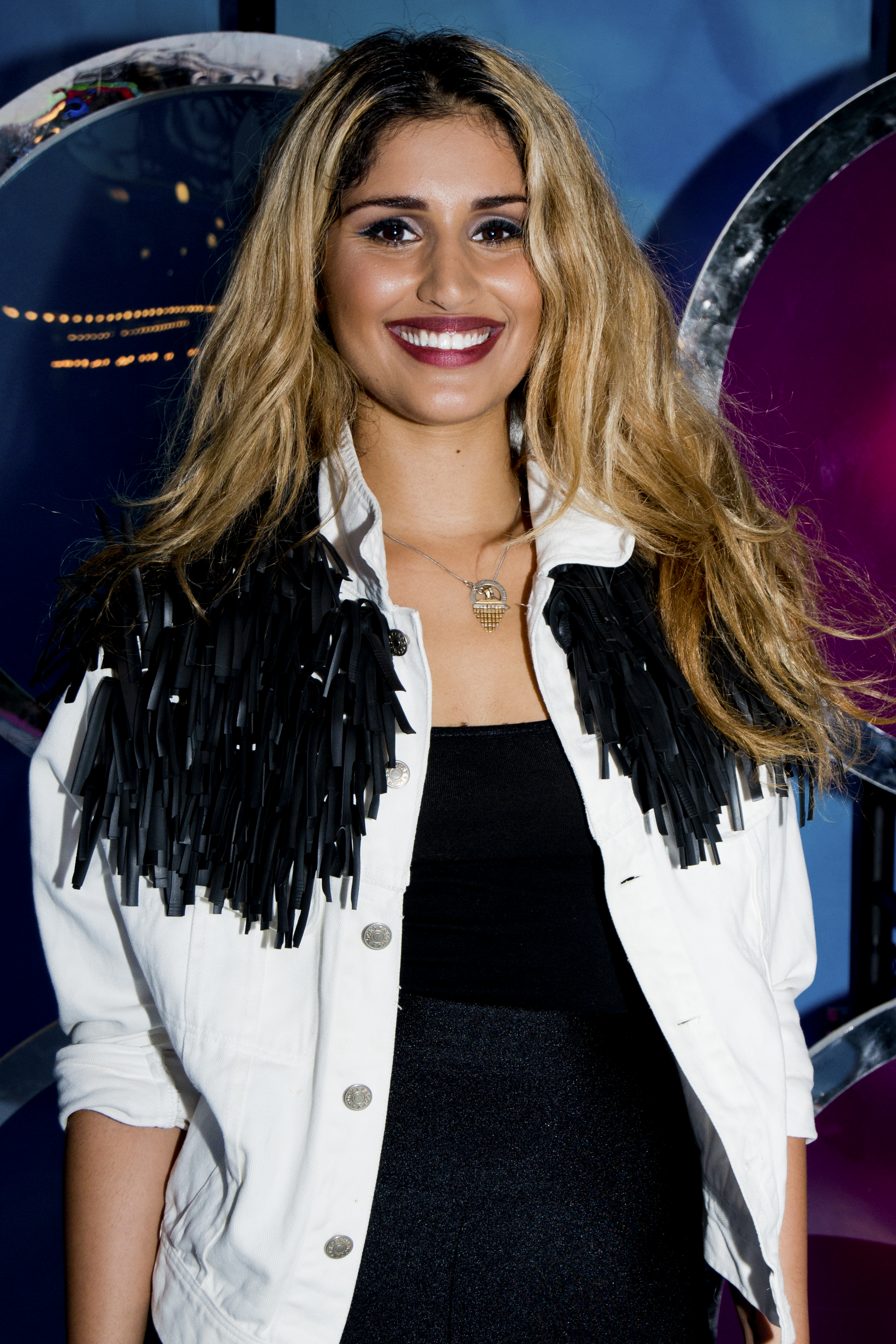
- Leon at Sommarkrysset in 2013

Background information
- Born: Janet Ava Owji; 19 October 1990 (age 35); Gothenburg, Sweden
- Genres: Pop; R&B
- Occupations: Singer, songwriter, a&r
- Instruments: Vocals, guitar
- Years active: 2003–present
- Labels: Sony BMG, Columbia, (Music World) (2003–2005); Roxy Recordings (2012–2013)
- Formerly of: Play (2003–2005)
- Website: owji.me

Janet Ava Owji (born 19 October 1990), also known by her stage name OWJI and her former stage name Janet Leon, is a Swedish singer, songwriter and A&R. Leon began her career as part of the pop group Play, for which she was lead singer 2003–2005. She rose to further prominence in Sweden with the release of her hit debut solo album Janet (2009) and the successful singles "Let Go" and "Heartache on the Dancefloor", both also released in 2009.

Leon competed in Melodifestivalen, an annual Swedish song competition which selects the country's representative for the Eurovision Song Contest, in 2013 and 2014. Her single "New Colours" was selected as the official song for Stockholm Pride 2013.

== Early life ==
Janet Ava Owji was born on 19 October 1990 in Gothenburg, Sweden to an Iranian father and a Spanish mother. She is an only child. Leon grew up in the Gothenburg borough Johanneberg and was in her childhood interested in music, theatre and football. She began playing the violin at the age of four and arranged performances of songs together with her friends while in kindergarten.

Leon began participating in talent shows as a singer at the age of seven; one of her earliest stage appearances was performing Spice Girls songs alongside some of her friends at a school talent show. She also began writing her own songs at around the age of 8. In her youth, Leon and some of her friends were part of a blues band called "Walking Spanish" which performed at various music festivals in Sweden.

Leon's musical idols and inspirations include Beyoncé, Mariah Carey, Eminem, Whitney Houston and Michael Jackson.

== Career ==
=== 2003–2005: Member of Play ===
Leon's professional music career began in 2003 when she at the age of 13 joined the Swedish pop group Play as lead singer in December 2003. She replaced the band's former lead singer, then 16-year-old Faye Hamlin, who left to finish her studies at school. Leon became acquintaned to the members of the band through her relatives and was recruited after sending in a demo to the band's manager, Laila Bagge. Bagge called back almost immediately after receiving the demo and travelled to Gothenburg the next day to hear Leon perform in person and ask her about her life goals. Leon was officially announced as part of Play in a press release on 15 December 2003.

Leon's first album with Play (and the group's third studio album overall), Don't Stop the Music, was released on 9 March 2004 but turned out to be a commercial failure. In the summer of 2004, Play went on a tour in the United States. The group were accompanied by some of their parents as well as a teacher to not fall behind in school. Play performed together with various artists during the tour, including Aaron Carter and Destiny's Child; Leon also had a dinner with her idol Beyoncé.

Play's next album, the Christmas-themed Play Around the Christmas, released in November 2004 and also failed to chart. In 2005 the group then released a compilation of hits, Girl's Mind, though only songs from Hamlin's time as lead singer were featured. In September 2005, Play announced an indefinite hiatus. Play was later briefly reformed 2009–2011, though Leon did not rejoin the group.

=== 2005–2011: Early solo career, debut album ===
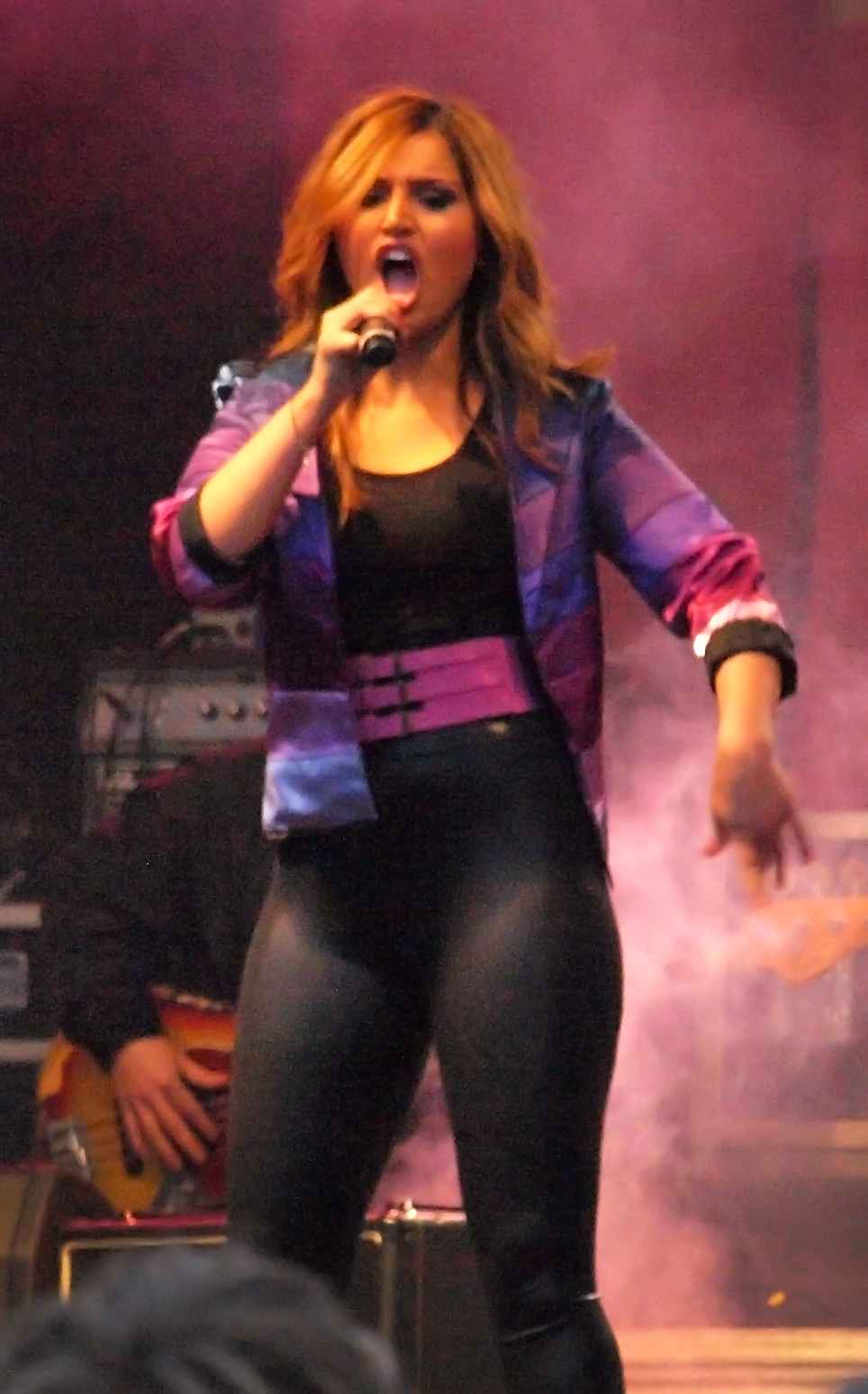
Leon performing in 2009

After the breakup of Play, Leon began a solo career, working towards the eventual goal of putting together a solo studio album. She continued to work with her manager Laila Bagge, as well as producers Anders Bagge and Andreas Carlsson, who had previously worked with Play. Her early solo work included recording songs for the American toy store brand Build-A-Bear Workshop and for Kohl's clothing brand everGirl. In 2005 she also contributed vocals to two songs on the Bratz: Rock Angelz Soundtrack. She voiced a fawn in the 2008 Swedish animated children's film Gnomes and Trolls: The Secret Chamber.

In late 2008, Leon was chosen to be one of two participants in the Swedish television show Made in Sweden, hosted by Laila Bagge, Anders Bagge and Andreas Carlsson. Made in Sweden saw the producers attempt to forge successful musical artists; in Leon's case the programme followed her over the course of two months as she worked on and prepared her first solo studio album. The album, titled Janet, was released in 2009 and became a hit, spending three weeks on the Swedish charts. Leon's debut single, "Let Go" (2009), also nearly topped the charts and her second single released later in the same year, "Heartache on the Dancefloor", rose to number 34 in Sweden and charted for a total of 10 weeks.

Following the release of her album and singles, Leon spent some time touring in Sweden and also began working on a second album. In 2010, she played a part in a Swedish musical stage production based on the film Grease (1978), which transplanted the plot of the film to 1960s Sweden. In 2011, Leon recorded vocals for the song "Fire Fly" on the Childish Gambino album Camp. On 3 December 2012, Leon released an acoustic version of the new song "These Chains" through the newspaper Expressen; "These Chains" was intended to eventually be part of her second album.

=== 2012–2014: Melodifestivalen ===
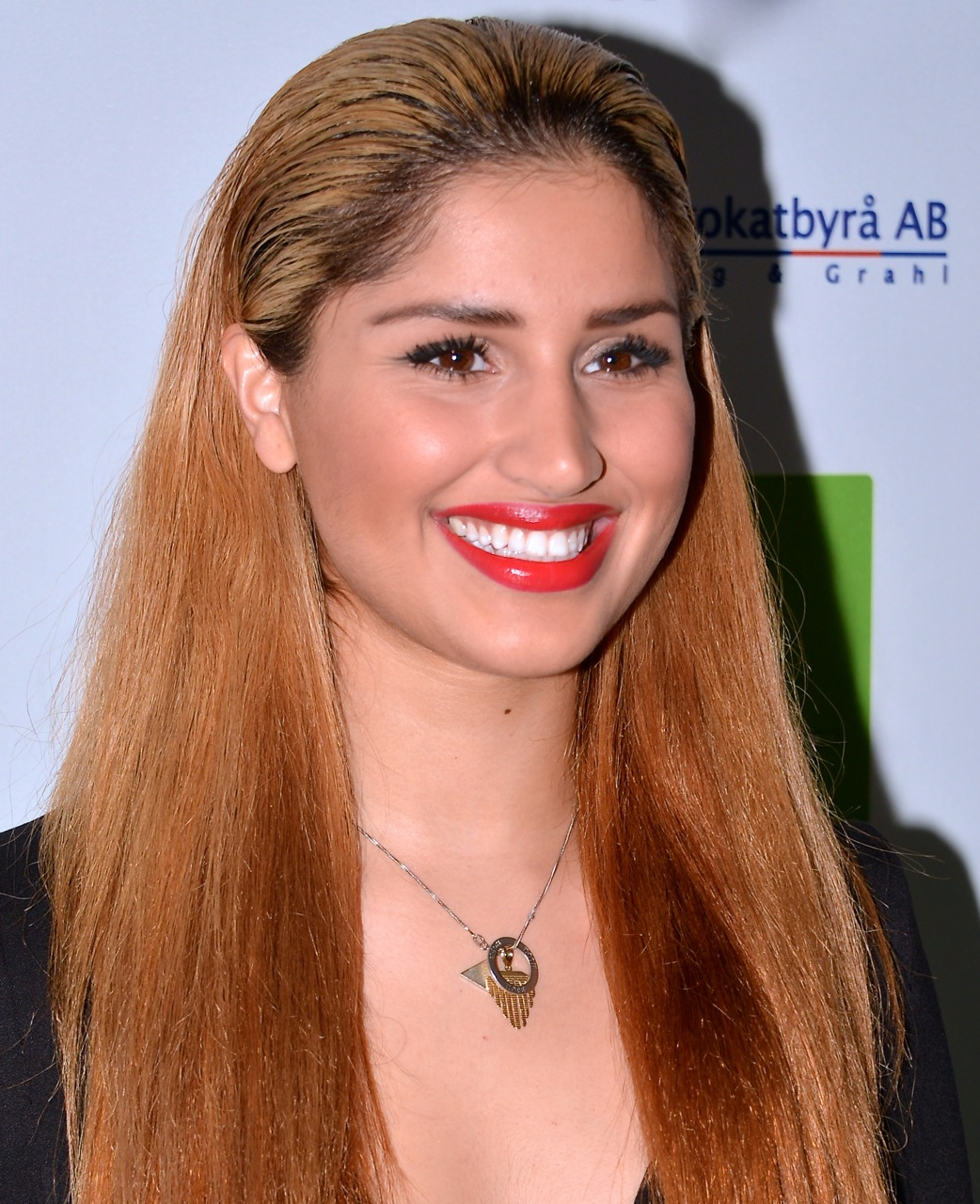
Leon at the 2013 Grammis ceremony

While working on her potential second album together with songwriter Jörgen Elofsson, the two had the idea to send in a song as a competing entry to Melodifestivalen, an annual Swedish song competition which selects the country's representative for the Eurovision Song Contest. Leon and Elofsson saw a potential performance in Melodifestivalen as a good comeback to relaunch Leon's musical career.

Leon's entry was accepted and she was officially announced as a contestant for Melodifestivalen 2013 in November 2012. Her entry, the original song "Heartstrings", was written by Fredrik Kempe and Anton Malmberg Hård af Segerstad. Leon performed "Heartstrings" in Skellefteå on 16 February 2013 and placed fifth in her semi-final, failing to qualify for the final. Leon had planned to release her second studio album in 2013 shortly after Melodifestivalen but it as of yet remains unreleased.

On 7 May 2013, Leon's new single "New Colours" was selected as the official song for Stockholm Pride 2013. The song was co-written by Leon, along with songwriters Jörgen Elofsson, Lisa Desmond and Jesper Jakobson and debuted at number 10 on the Swedish music chart Svensktoppen. Also in 2013, Leon provided backing vocals for Agnetha Fältskog's album A.

In November 2013, Leon was announced as a contestant for Melodifestivalen 2014, competing with the song "Hollow". The song was written by songwriters Karl-Ola Kjellholm, Jimmy Jansson, and Louise Winter and was performed by Leon in Örnsköldsvik on 22 February 2014. Leon placed eighth and last in the semi-final and did thus not qualify for the final. "Hollow" was a challenging song to sing; Leon lost her voice while singing it several times during rehearsals.

=== 2014–present: Career in the United States ===
In late September 2014, Leon moved to Los Angeles, California to further pursue her dreams. Beginning in 2014 she worked as a songwriter and A&R, for instance at the entertainment company DEFIENT. She has in this capacity worked together with various artists, including Elva Hsiao.

On 7 April 2021, Leon partook in the Clubhouse talk "Women in Music – Goddess Power Unite", hosted by Swedish musician Josefine. The talk also featured various other female musicians and music creatives and also brought attention to the UK-based social organization Girls Out Loud.

In October and November 2022, Leon joined fellow Swedish-Iranian singer Arash on a tour of North America, performing concerts in support of the Mahsa Amini protests in Iran.

On 14 April 2023, she stated that she would no longer be using the stage name "Janet Leon", citing as reasons the strange experience of growing up in the music industry and not being herself. She instead announced that she would henceforth use the stage name OWJI (pronounced O-G), adapted from her family name.

== Personal life ==
Leon moved from Gothenburg to Stockholm, where her musical collaborators were based, in 2009. Leon revealed in February 2012 that she then lived in Stockholm together with her boyfriend, whom she had been dating for sixteen months. In September of the same year Leon moved in together with her friend My in the Årsta borough of Stockholm. Leon has since moved to Los Angeles in 2014 but frequently travels back to Sweden.

== Discography ==
=== Studio albums ===
List of studio albums, with selected chart positions
Title	Album details	Peak chart positions
Title	Album details	SWE
Janet	Released: 18 February 2009; Label: Sony BMG, Columbia; Formats: CD, digital download	14

As a member of Play:

- 2004: Don't Stop the Music
- 2004: Play Around the Christmas Tree

=== Singles ===
List of singles as lead artist, with selected chart positions and certifications, showing year released and album name
Title	Year	Peak chart positions	Album
Title	Year	SWE	Album
"Let Go"	2009	3	Janet
"Heartache on the Dance Floor"	2009	34	Janet
"These Chains"	2012	—	—
"Heartstrings"	2013	36	Melodifestivalen 2013
"New Colours"	2013	10	—
"Hollow"	2014	—	Melodifestivalen 2014
