= Andreas Carlsson =

Swedish music producer and songwriter (born 1973)

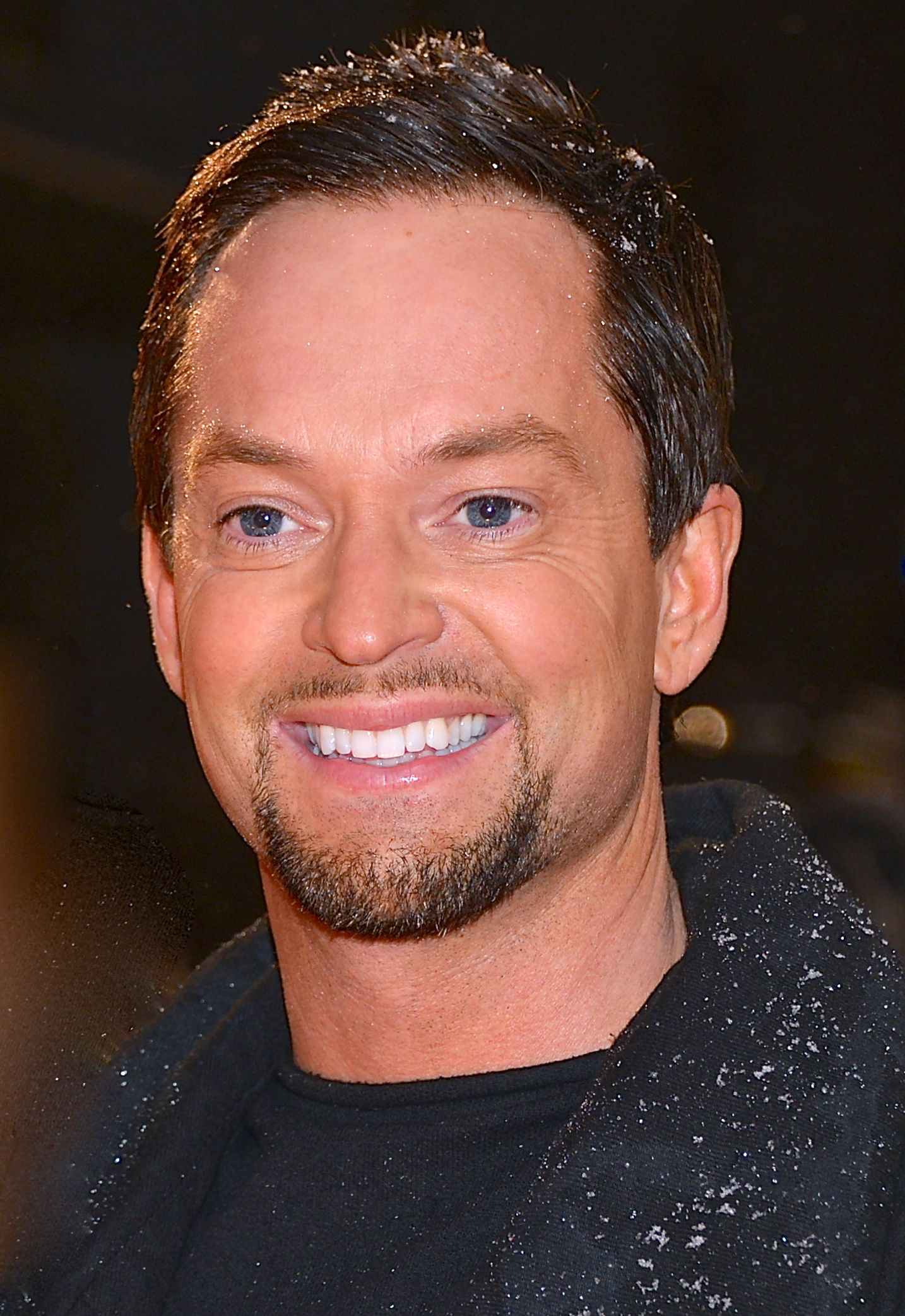
- Andreas Carlsson at a movie premiere in Stockholm, 2012.

Background information
- Born: Andreas Mikael Carlsson; 3 April 1973 (age 53); Danderyd, Stockholm, Sweden
- Genres: Pop; rock
- Occupations: Music producer; songwriter
- Website: www.andreascarlsson.se

Andreas Mikael Carlsson (Swedish pronunciation: [anˈdrêːas ˈkɑ̌ːɭsɔn]; born 3 April 1973) is a Swedish music producer and pop songwriter.

== Biography ==
Carlsson was part of the Cheiron Studios team until the studio was closed down in 2000. In January 2001, former Cheiron-members Andreas Carlsson, Kristian Lundin and Jake Schulze assumed the lease of the legendary Cheiron studios. Two years later, they launched production-company The Location and publishing-company Location Songs, where writer Savan Kotecha is signed.

Carlsson frequently collaborates with writers Desmond Child and Chris Braide. Together they have written many hit songs, including "Invisible" for Irish boy band D-Side and American Idol contestant Clay Aiken. The song became one of the most performed on American radio in 2004. A more recent collaboration is Katy Perry's "Waking Up in Vegas", featured on her album One of the Boys. Carlsson also co-wrote the song "Strange" for the Alice in Wonderland soundtrack, which was performed by Tokio Hotel and Kerli Kõiv.

In 2008, Carlsson formed production/publishing company Meriola with fellow producer and songwriter Anders Bagge, who has written and produced songs for Madonna, Janet Jackson, Cross Gene and Jennifer Lopez, among others.

In 2009, Carlsson wrote his autobiography Live to Win - låtarna som skrev mitt liv ("The songs which wrote my life"), about his career and journey to where he is today.

=== Television ===
Carlsson was part of the jury for the Swedish edition of Idol from 2008, its fifth season. The last season Carlsson was a judge in began its run on 7 September 2010 on the Swedish television channel TV4. On 14 March 2011, Carlsson announced his departure from the jury, citing his desire to go back to songwriting.

In 2012, he was one of the judges on the Swedish version of X Factor. In recent years, Carlsson has been lecturing and giving motivational speeches in different schools in Sweden.

== Notable writing credits ==
Year	Artist	Song	Appearance on album
1999	Britney Spears	"Born to Make You Happy"	...Baby One More Time
1999	Britney Spears	"I Will Be There"	...Baby One More Time
1999	Britney Spears	"Deep in My Heart"	...Baby One More Time
1999	Backstreet Boys	"I Want It That Way"	Millennium
1999	Westlife	"No No"	Westlife
1999	Westlife	"I Need You"	Westlife
1999	Westlife	"Open Your Heart"	Westlife
1999	Celine Dion	"That's the Way It Is"	All the Way… A Decade of Song
2000	NSYNC	"Bye Bye Bye"	No Strings Attached
2000	NSYNC	"It's Gonna Be Me"	No Strings Attached
2000	Britney Spears	"Where Are You Now"	Oops!... I Did It Again
2000	Britney Spears	"Can't Make You Love Me"	Oops!... I Did It Again
2000	Westlife	"When You're Looking Like That"	Coast to Coast
2000	Westlife	"Somebody Needs You"	Coast to Coast
2000	Westlife	"Soledad"	Coast to Coast
2000	Backstreet Boys	"Everyone"	Black & Blue
2000	Backstreet Boys	"Not for Me"	Black & Blue
2000	Backstreet Boys	"It's True"	Black & Blue
2001	NSYNC	"Just Don't Tell Me That"	Celebrity
2001	NSYNC	"That Girl (Will Never Be Mine)"	Celebrity
2001	Backstreet Boys	"Drowning"	The Hits: Chapter One
2002	Celine Dion	"I'm Alive"	A New Day Has Come
2002	Celine Dion	"The Greatest Reward"	A New Day Has Come
2002	Celine Dion	"Coulda Woulda Shoulda"	A New Day Has Come
2002	Def Leppard	"Unbelievable"	X
2002	LeAnn Rimes	"Life Goes On"	Twisted Angel
2002	LeAnn Rimes	"Suddenly"	Twisted Angel
2002	Bon Jovi	"Everyday"	Bounce
2002	Bon Jovi	"Misunderstood"	Bounce
2002	Bon Jovi	"All About Lovin' You"	Bounce
2002	Bon Jovi	"Hook Me Up"	Bounce
2002	Bon Jovi	"You Had Me from Hello"	Bounce
2002	Sandy & Junior	"Words Are Not Enough"	S&J Internacional
2003	Clay Aiken	"Invisible"	Measure of a Man
2004	Hilary Duff	"Crash World"	A Cinderella Story: Original Soundtrack
2004	Hilary Duff	"Who's That Girl?"	Hilary Duff
2004	Ana Johnsson	"We Are"	The Way I Am
2004	Lindsay Lohan	"Symptoms of You"	Speak
2004	Diana DeGarmo	"Emotional"	Blue Skies
2004	Diana DeGarmo	"Dreams"	Blue Skies
2005	Carrie Underwood	"Inside Your Heaven"	Some Hearts
2005	Jesse McCartney	"Because You Live"	Beautiful Soul
2005	Lindsay Lohan	"I Live for the Day"	A Little More Personal (Raw)
2005	Amanda Stott	"Homeless Heart"^{[A]}	Chasing the Sky
2005	Bratz	"So Good"	Rock Angelz
2006	Clay Aiken	"Lonely No More"	A Thousand Different Ways
2006	Paul Stanley	"Live to Win"	Live to Win
2006	Paul Stanley	Wake Up Screaming	Live to Win
2006	Paul Stanley	Bulletproof	Live to Win
2006	Paul Stanley	All About You	Live to Win
2006	Paul Stanley	Second To None	Live to Win
2007	Erik Segerstedt	"I Can't Say I'm Sorry"	A Different Shade
2008	Katy Perry	"Waking Up in Vegas"	One of the Boys
2008	Kevin Borg	"With Every Bit of Me"	The Beginning
2009	Janet Leon	"Heartbreak on the Dancefloor"	Janet
2009	Tata Young	"Boys Will Be Boys"	Ready for Love
2009	Europe	"Last Look at Eden"	Last Look at Eden
2009	Europe	"New Love in Town"	Last Look at Eden
2010	Tokio Hotel and Kerli	"Strange"	Almost Alice
2010	Play	"Famous"	Under My Skin
2010	Play	"Trash"	Under My Skin
2010	Play	"Girls"	Under My Skin
2010	Play	"Personal Victory"	Under My Skin
2010	Ricky Martin	"The Best Thing About Me Is You"	Música + Alma + Sexo
2010	Idol Allstars 2010	"All I Need Is You"	Det bästa från Idol 2010
2010	Big Time Rush	"Famous"	BTR
2011	Erika Jayne	"Party People (Ignite the World)"	Party People (Ignite the World)
2012	Jedward	"P.O.V."	Young Love
2013	VIXX	"B.O.D.Y"	Voodoo
2014	Cross Gene	"Amazing"	Ying Yang
2015	SHINee	"Black Hole"	Odd
2018	BoA	"Manhattan Tango"	Watashi Kono Mama de Ii no Kana
2019	Tomorrow X Together	"9 and Three Quarters (Run Away)"	The Dream Chapter: Magic
2020	Lil Uzi Vert	"That Way"	Eternal Atake
2020	Taeyeon	"Worry Free Love"	#GirlsSpkOut
2020	ENHYPEN	"Given-Taken"	Border: Day One
2021	fromis_9	"Talk & Talk"	Non-album single
2021	BamBam	"riBBon"	riBBon
