= Laila Bagge Wahlgren =

Palestinian Swedish singer (born 1972)

Laila Bagge
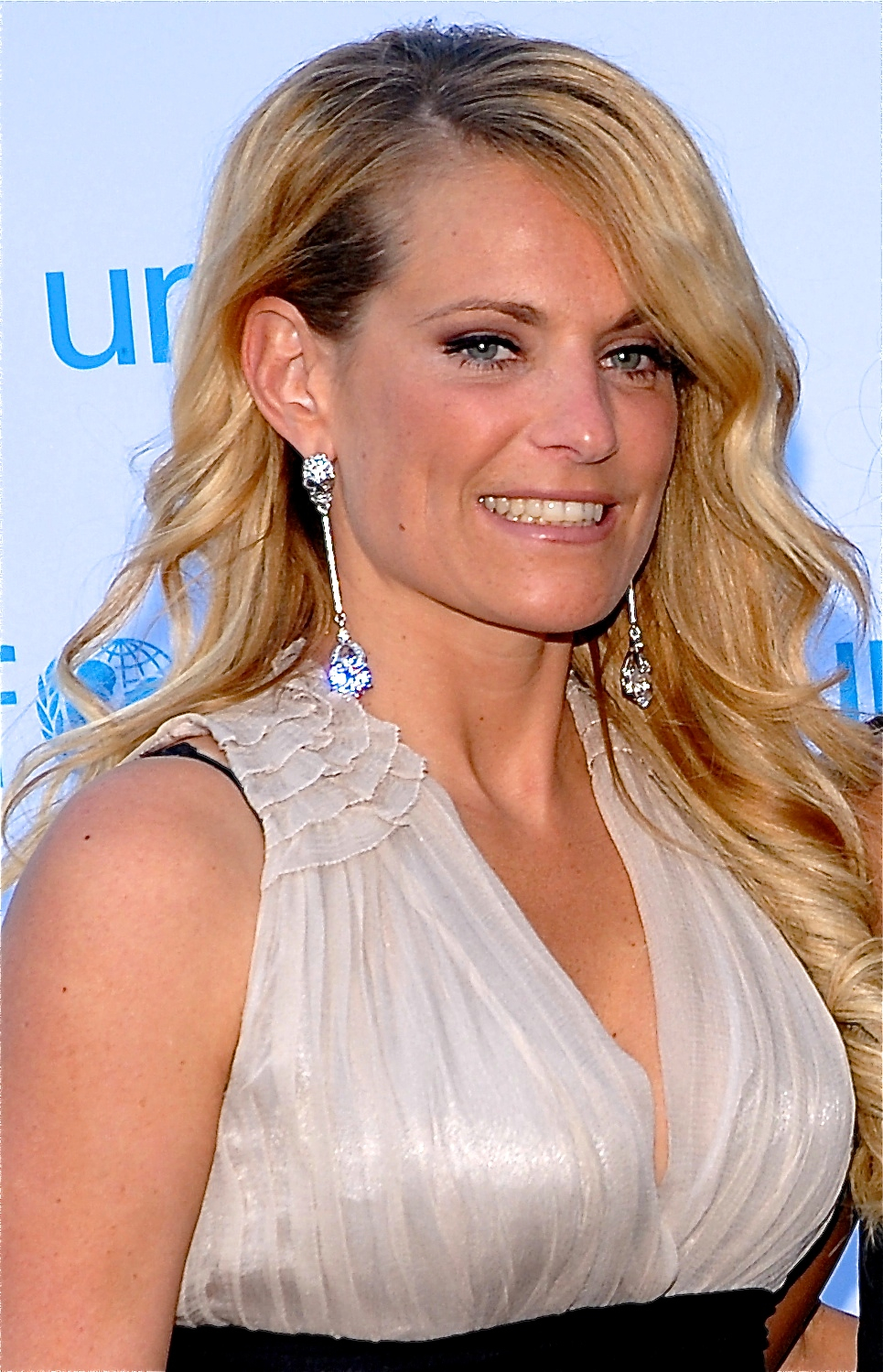
- Laila Bagge (2012)

Background information
- Born: Laila Natali Cahling; 15 December 1972 (age 53)
- Origin: Lund, Sweden
- Genres: Pop
- Occupations: Songwriter, manager, singer, radio host
- Years active: 1997–present
- Label: Motown

Laila Natali Bagge (born 15 December 1972 in Lund, Sweden, as Laila Natali Cahling), formerly Laila Bagge Wahlgren, is a Palestinian-Swedish singer, manager and songwriter.

== Biography ==
Her mother is Swedish and her father is Palestinian.

She was signed to Motown Records in the 1990s, and released the top-40 hit "Here We Go Again" in 1998.

She worked for Sony BMG New York for three years as a talent scout. Laila also found the members and developed the girl group Play which she co-managed with Mathew Knowles. Play was signed to Sony BMG New York and the group sold nearly 1 million albums. Laila has written songs for Céline Dion, 98 Degrees, 702 and Mýa. In 2007 Laila started two new companies together with Anders Bagge (songwriter & producer) and Andreas Carlsson (songwriter): Meriola Media Group AB and Meriola Songs AB.

== Television ==
Wahlgren was an Idol 2008 judge together with Anders Bagge and Andreas Carlsson, and returned for the sixth season Idol 2009. The show began to air 8 September 2009 on TV4. She was a part of the jury every year until 2015.

Laila also participated in the Let's Dance 2009 show on the Swedish television channel TV4. She finished in second place. In 2009 she also participated in the television program Jag ska bli stjärna (English: I'm going to become a star) and flew with singer Zara Larsson to the United States, hoping to release her there.

Laila, Anders and Andreas worked in the television program Made in Sweden, which was broadcast for two seasons, in 2009 and 2010.

== Personal life ==
In July 2003, Laila Wahlgren gave birth to a boy, Liam Pitts with her former partner Mason Pitts, founding member of the Swedish rock band (Apollo Drive), currently a producer, talent scout and licensing executive. Previously, Pitts worked as road manager for Bagge and her then co-manager Mathew Knowles, for Swedish pop group PLAY. Bagge and Pitts also formerly co-managed Swedish artists together, including – (John Martin), current collaborator/vocalist with two time Grammy nominated group (Swedish House Mafia), whom Pitts originally discovered in a department store in Stockholm, where Martin worked as a sales person. Laila was once married to Anders Bagge. On 6 March 2010, she married Niclas Wahlgren, with whom she has one son, Kit, born in October 2011. The couple split in late 2014.

== Discography ==
=== Albums ===
- Hello Laila (1998)
- All About Love (2004)

=== Singles ===
- Here We Go Again (1998)
