= Oscar Zia =

Swedish singer, songwriter, and actor (born 1996)

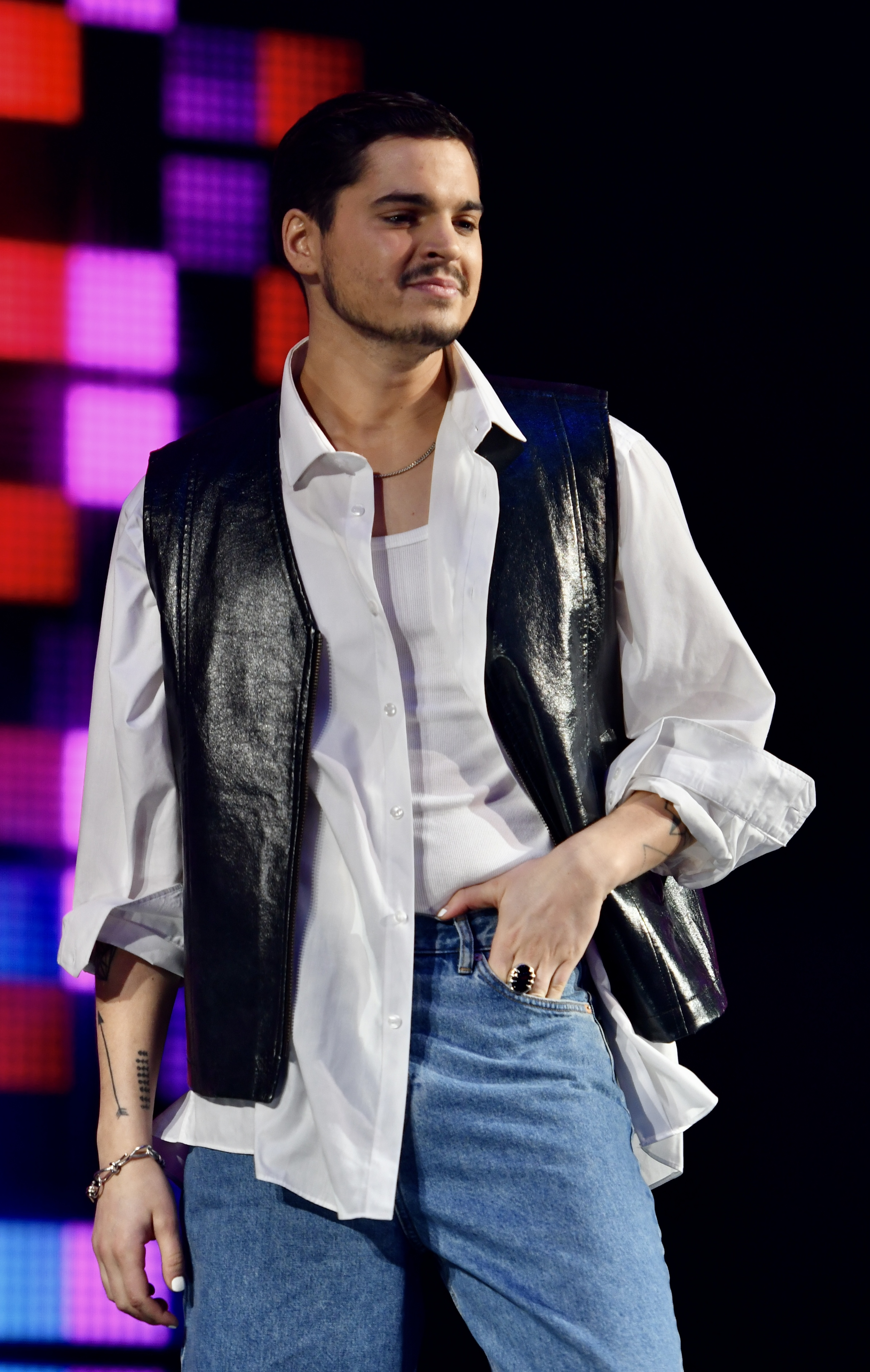
- Zia in 2022

Background information
- Born: 10 October 1996 (age 29); Svedala, Sweden
- Genres: Pop
- Occupations: Singer; songwriter
- Years active: 2012–present
- Label: Parlophone Sweden

Oscar Zia (born 10 October 1996) is a Swedish singer, songwriter, and actor. In 2012, he first came to national attention for coming eighth in the Swedish version of X Factor. In 2014, Zia finished as runner-up on the eighth season of Let's Dance, the Swedish version of Dancing with the Stars.

Following X Factor, Zia signed a record deal with Warner Music, and in 2014, he released his debut album I Don't Know How to Dance, which peaked at number three in Sweden. He has competed in Melodifestivalen twice, in 2014 with "Yes We Can" and in 2016 with "Human". In 2021, he returned to the competition as a guest co-host with Anis Don Demina, and later hosted the entire competition in 2022. In 2020, Zia made his acting debut on Cryptid on Viaplay.

== Career ==
=== 2012: X Factor ===
Zia first appeared in the 2012 Swedish X Factor in the show's inaugural season auditioning with "Without You" by David Guetta. He ended in the Final 12 in the "Boys under 25" category coached by the judge assigned for the category Ison Glasgow. He finished 8th overall between 12 final contestants. His performances included:

- Week 1 (5 October 2012) – "Boyfriend" from Justin Bieber – Result: Safe
- Week 2 (12 October 2012) – "DJ Got Us Fallin' in Love from Usher – Result: Safe
- Week 3 (19 October 2012) – "Danza Kuduro" from Don Omar featuring Lucenzo – Result: Safe
- Week 4 (26 October 2012) – "When You Say Nothing at All" from Ronan Keating – Result: Safe
- Week 5 (2 November 2012) – "Moves Like Jagger" from Maroon 5 – Result: Bottom 2
- Bottom 2 duel (3 November 2012) – "It Will Rain" from Bruno Mars – Result: Deadlock by judges (2 of 4 votes) / Elimination by public vote / 8th overall

=== 2013: Melodifestivalen 2013 and Let's Dance 2013 ===
In 2013, Zia was in the backing vocals alongside Loulou Lamotte in the Behrang Miri song "Jalla Dansa Sawa" performed in Melodifestivalen 2013, the Swedish selection process for Eurovision Song Contest 2013. Although the song failed to make it to the finals after a duel elimination round won by Anton Ewald and his song "Begging", the song gained great popularity with the Swedish public and the single was released immediately after the competition reaching number 4 on Sverigetopplistan, the official Swedish Singles Chart.

Zia was one of the contestants in Let's Dance 2013, the eighth season of the Swedish version of Dancing with the Stars, broadcast on the Swedish television channel TV4. He finished as the runner-up behind the winner Markoolio.

=== 2014–2015: Melodifestivalen 2014 and I Don't Know How to Dance ===
In 2014, he took part in Melodifestivalen 2014 in a bid to represent Sweden in the Eurovision Song Contest 2014, this time as a solo singer with the song "Yes We Can". It reached the Final 10 held on 8 March 2014, and he finished 8th overall in the Final 10. He was chosen as a member of the Swedish jury for that year's Eurovision Song Contest 2014. After this, he released his debut studio album I Don't Know How to Dance on the 26 March on the Warner Music Group label. The album peaked at number 3 on the Swedish album charts, Sverigetopplistan.

=== 2016: Melodifestivalen 2016 and "Human" ===
In 2016, Zia again participated in Melodifestivalen 2016 with the song "Human", which was co-written with Victor Thell and Maria Smith. He took part in the third semi-final on 20 February 2016, and again progressed to the final held on 12 March 2016 in a bid to represent Sweden in the Eurovision Song Contest 2016. In the final, he won the jury vote by 1 point over Frans, placed third with the Swedish public, and was the overall runner-up.

=== 2017–present: Din and Melodifestivalen hosting ===
In November 2018, Zia released his first extended play, Din. The extended play has yielded two charting singles, "Kyss mig i slo-mo" and "Betong", peaking at number seven and thirteen on the Swedish Heatseekers Chart, respectively.

In February 2021, Zia co-hosted the semi-final 2 of the Melodifestivalen 2021 along with Swedish singer and producer Christer Björkman and Swedish DJ Anis Don Demina as a guest host. Zia and Demina performed "Stad i ljus" on the stage.

On 7 September 2021, it was announced that Zia would be presenting Melodifestivalen 2022.

== Personal life ==
In February 2016, Zia came out as gay. Both his parents are Italian-born, from the Venice area. He has five siblings named Anna, Dante, Isac, Leonardo and Isabella.

== Discography ==
=== Studio albums ===
Title	Details	Peak chart positions
Title	Details	SWE
I Don't Know How to Dance	Released: 26 March 2014; Label: Warner Music; Format: Digital download, CD	3
Heartbreakmiljonär	Released: 13 October 2023; Label: Sony; Format: Digital download	—

=== Single albums ===
Title	Details
dö(d) för mig	Released: 10 September 2021; Label: Self-released; Format: Digital download

=== Extended plays ===
Title	Details
Din	Released: 2 November 2018; Label: Warner Music; Format: Digital download

=== Singles ===
==== As lead artist ====
Title	Year	Peak chart positions	Certifications	Album
Title	Year	SWE	Certifications	Album
"#Fail"	2013	—		I Don't Know How to Dance
"Yes We Can"	2014	19	GLF: Gold	I Don't Know How to Dance
"Ballare Con Me"	2014	—		I Don't Know How to Dance
"Human"	2016	7	GLF: Platinum	Melodifestivalen 2016
"I Want You"	2016	—		Non-album singles
"Det går aldrig"	2018	— (Note: "Det går aldrig" did not enter the Swedish Singles Chart, but peaked at number nine on the Swedish Heatseekers chart.)		Non-album singles
"Kyss mig i slo-mo" (featuring Leslie Tay)	2018	— (Note: "Kyss mig i slo-mo" did not enter the Swedish Singellista Chart, but peaked at number seven on the Swedish Heatseeker Chart.)	GLF: Gold	Din
"Vem tar hand om dig" (featuring Lamix)	2018	—		Din
"Betong"	2018	— (Note: "Betong" did not enter the Swedish Singellista Chart, but peaked at number 13 on the Swedish Heatseeker Chart.)		Din
"Finns det nån"	2019	—		Non-album singles
"Ingen kan göra dig hel"	2019	—		Non-album singles
"Dansar"	2020	—		Non-album singles
"Liten"	2020	—		Non-album singles
"Antidepp"	2020	—		Non-album singles
"Älska mig" (with Janice)	2020	—		Non-album singles
"Vill ha dig nu"	2020	— (Note: "Vill ha dig nu" did not enter the Swedish Singles Chart, but peaked at number six on the Swedish Heatseeker chart.)		Non-album singles
"Skuggor"	2021	—		Non-album singles
"Då tror du fel"	2021	— (Note: "Då tror du fel" did not enter the Swedish Singellista Chart, but peaked at number 16 on the Swedish Heatseeker Chart.)		Non-album singles
"Ta på mig"	2021	—		Non-album singles
"Säga inget säger allt"	2021	—		dö(d) för mig
"Nyårsvals"	2021	—		Non-album singles
"Autopilot"	2023	— (Note: "Autopilot" did not enter the Swedish Singellista Chart, but peaked at number 15 on the Swedish Heatseeker Chart.)		Non-album singles
"Golvet i hallen"	2023	—		Non-album singles
"Vem bryr sig"	2023	—		Heartbreakmiljonär
"Tiotusen"	2023	—		Heartbreakmiljonär
"Famlande fingrar"	2023	—		Heartbreakmiljonär
"Kan nått fint få hända sen" (with Clara Klingenström)	2023	—		TBA
"Heartbreakmiljonär"	2023	— (Note: "Heartbreakmiljonär" did not enter the Swedish Singellista Chart, but peaked at number four on the Swedish Heatseeker Chart.)		Heartbreakmiljonär
"—" denotes a single that did not chart or was not released in that territory.

==== As featured artist ====
Title	Year	Peak chart positions	Certifications	Album
Title	Year	SWE	Certifications	Album
"Jalla Dansa Sawa" (Behrang Miri featuring Oscar Zia and Loulou Lamotte)	2013	4	GLF: Platinum	Non-album single
"Stad i ljus" (Anis Don Demina featuring Oscar Zia)	2021	— (Note: "Stad i ljus" did not enter the Swedish Singellista Chart, but peaked at number 16 on the Swedish Heatseeker Chart.)		Underbarn
