= Alibi (disambiguation) =

An alibi is a statement by a person, who is a possible perpetrator of a crime, of where they were at the time a particular offence was committed, which is somewhere other than where the crime took place.

Alibi(s) or The Alibi may also refer to:

== Arts and entertainment ==
=== Film, television, theatre and podcasts ===
- Alibi (1929 film), an American crime film
- Alibi (1931 film), a British film based on the Agatha Christie play (see below)
- The Alibi (1937 film), a French mystery film
- Alibi (1942 film), a British mystery film
- Alibi (1955 film), a West German drama film
- Alibi (1969 film), an Italian comedy film
- Alibi, a 1997 American television film directed by Andy Wolk
- The Alibi, a 2006 American romantic comedy film
- Alibi (podcast), an African investigative podcast series
- Alibi (TV channel), now known as U&Alibi
- "Alibi" (NCIS), a television episode
- "Alibi" (Vinyl), a television episode
- Alibi (play), a 1928 play by Agatha Christie
- The Alibi (play), by Arthur M. Brilant, adapted for the 1918 film Broken Ties
- The Alibi (TV series), a Philippine drama series

=== Literature ===
- Alibi, a 2005 novel by Joseph Kanon
- Weekly Alibi, a newspaper in Albuquerque, New Mexico, US
- Alibi Bar, a bar in the Nick Knatterton comic strip

=== Music ===
- Alibi (duo), English dance music duo
- Alibi, Swedish singer of Tunisian descent in the duo Medina
- Alibi (Dutch duo), Dutch trance music project by Armin van Buuren and DJ Tiësto

==== Albums ====
- Alibi (America album), 1980
- Alibi (Vandenberg album) or the title song, 1985
- Alibis (album) or the title song (see below), by Tracy Lawrence, 1993
- Alibis, by Carole Laure, 1978

==== Songs ====
- "Alibi" (David Gray song), 2006
- "Alibi" (Eddie Razaz song), 2013
- "Alibi" (Ella Henderson song), featuring Rudimental, 2024
- "Alibi" (Milica Pavlović song), 2014
- "Alibi" (Sevdaliza, Pabllo Vittar and Yseult song), 2024
- "Alibi", by Christopher Cross from Back of My Mind, 1988
- "Alibi", by Banks from Goddess, 2014
- "Alibi", by Bradley Cooper from the A Star Is Born film soundtrack, 2018
- "Alibi", by Elvis Costello from When I Was Cruel, 2002
- "Alibi", by Ringo Starr from Old Wave, 1983
- "Alibi", by Thirty Seconds to Mars from This Is War, 2009
- "Alibis" (song), by Tracy Lawrence, 1993
- "Alibis", by Marianas Trench from Fix Me, 2006
- "Alibis", by Martika from Martika, 1988
- "Alibis", by Moev, 1984
- "Alibis", by Sérgio Mendes from Confetti, 1984
- "Alibis", by Sneaker Pimps from Squaring the Circle (2021)

== Other uses ==
- Alibi (Portland, Oregon), a restaurant
- Alibi transformation, in mathematics

== See also ==
- "A" Is for Alibi, a 1982 novel by Sue Grafton
