= Din (EP) =

- EP artwork. Creative direction and photography by Alexander Collin

EP by Oscar Zia
- Released: November 2, 2018
- Recorded: 2017–2018
- Genre: Pop; R&B; dance pop
- Length: 22:14
- Label: Warner Music Sweden
- Producer: Martin René; Rob Milo; Edgeology; Frans Torell; Teo Runsiö; Pontus Persson

Oscar Zia chronology
I Don't Know How to Dance (2014)	Din (2018)

Singles from Din
- 1. "Kyss mig i slo-mo" Released: 6 April 2018; 2. "Vem tar hand om dig" Released: 25 May 2018; 3. "Betong" Released: 21 September 2018

Din is the first extended play by Swedish singer and songwriter Oscar Zia. It consists of four previously released songs and two new songs as well as the acoustic version of "Nice". The extended play was released on November 2, 2018 through Warner Music Sweden via digital download. The songs on the extended play are entirely written and sung in Zia's native language, Swedish.

== Background ==
About the reason why Zia decided to write songs in Swedish, he stated that "it's easier to be personal in Swedish and I've always felt that I want to be as personal as possible in my songs. Singing in Swedish is much more honest and straightforward. It just feels just right" in an interview with Aftonbladet.

The Swedish newspaper TTELA reported that Din was supposed to be a full album, however, but Zia decided to release the songs as an extended play to end a chapter in his life, a relationship that ended.

== Promotion ==
=== Singles ===
"Kyss mig i slo-mo" was released on 6 April 2018 as the lead single from Din and Zia's second Swedish language single, following his standalone single "Det Går Aldrig". The song, which features the Swedish R&B singer Leslie Tay, peaked at number seven on the Swedish Heatseeker Chart. Zia promoted the song with Tay, appearing the Swedish morning television show, Nyhetsmorgon. The music video was directed by Zia himself and has accumulated more than 220,000 views on YouTube as of June, 2020.

"Vem tar hand om dig" was released on 25 May 2018 as the second single from Din. The song features the Swedish rapper, Lamix as the guest vocalist.

The third single from the extended play, "Betong" was released on 21 September 2018 and reached number 13 on the Swedish Heatseeker Chart. The song was called "a beautiful, heartfelt ballad" by the Scandinavian popular music website, Scandipop. Antranig Shokayan of Wiwibloggs wrote that the song "marks a stellar continuation in Oscar's evolution as an artist".

=== Other songs ===
"Nice" was originally released as the B-side song of the single, "Betong" on 21 September 2018. As well as the original version, the acoustic version of the song, titled "Nice (Akustisk version)" is included on the extended play as the bonus track.

=== Concert ===
To promote the extended play, Zia played his own very first concert at the photography museum Fotografiska, in Södermalm, Stockholm.

== Track listing ==
Credits adapted from Spotify.

No.	Title	Writer(s)	Producer(s)	Length
1.	"Din"	Oscar Zia; Martin René; Rob Milo; Wilhelm Börjesson	Martin René; Rob Milo	2:49
2.	"Kyss mig i slo-mo" (featuring Leslie Tay)	Zia; Jonas Jurström; Kim Koubou; Rasmus Blixt; Petter; Leslie Tay	Edgeology	3:04
3.	"Säg om du vill"	Zia; René; Nadja Evelina; Cassandra Strömberg	René	3:26
4.	"Betong"	Zia; Frans Torell; Teo Runsiö; Annika Norlin; Fanny Hultman; Julia Adams; Madelene Eliasson	Frans Torell; Teo Runsiö	2:46
5.	"Nice"	Zia; Linnea Henriksson; Pontus Persson	Pontus Persson	3:11
6.	"Vem tar hand om dig" (featuring Lamix)	Zia; Persson; Lamix; Petter Tarland	Persson	3:26
7.	"Nice" (Acoustic version)	Zia; Henriksson; Persson	Persson	3:32
Total length:				22:14

== Release history ==
Region	Date	Format	Label	Ref.
Sweden	November 2, 2018	Digital download	Warner Music Sweden	
