= Eddie Razaz =

Swedish singer (born 1988)

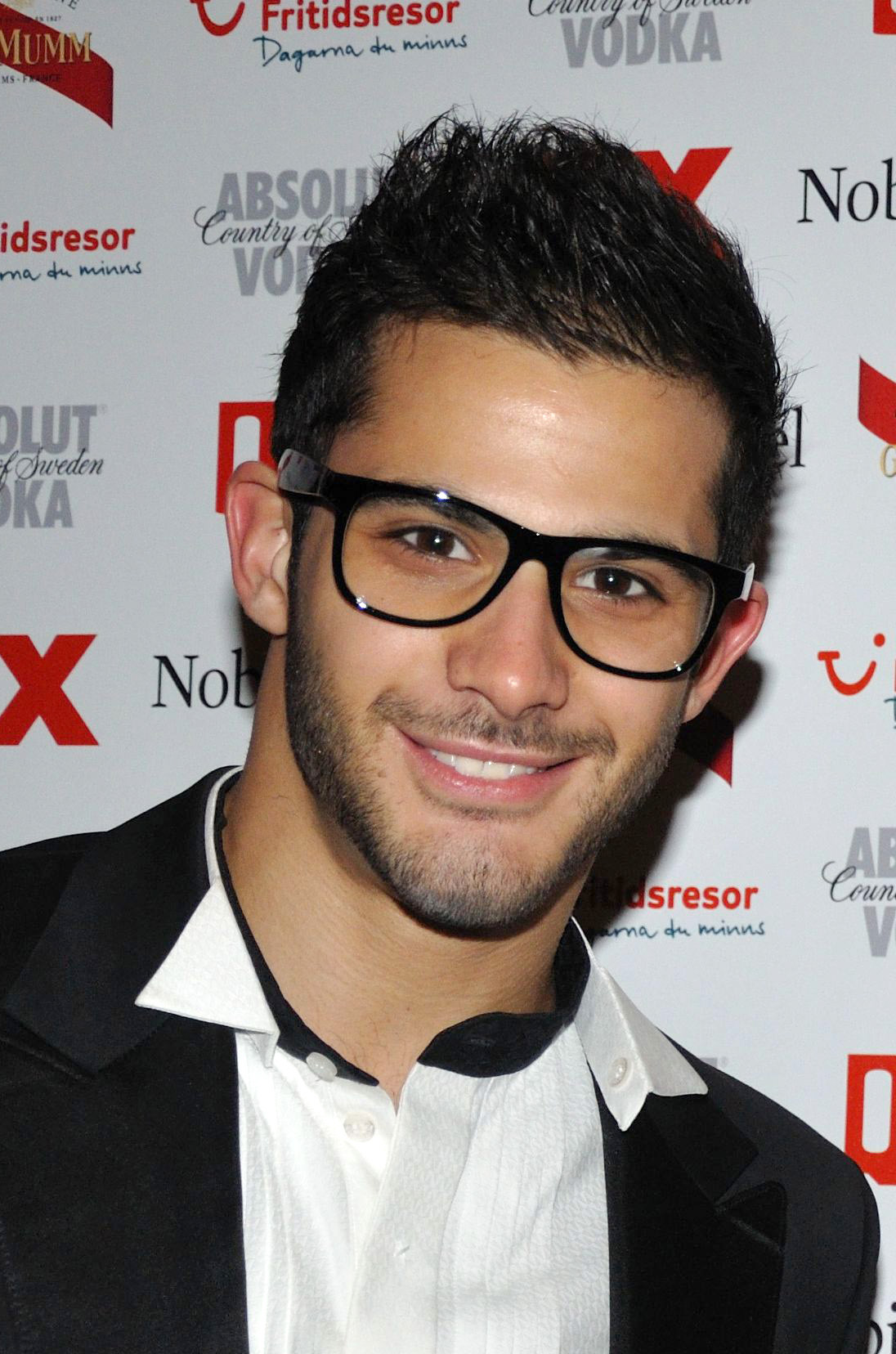

Background information
- Born: Ardalan Razaz Rahmati; 21 December 1988 (age 37); Stockholm, Sweden
- Genres: Pop
- Occupations: Singer, Model
- Instrument: Vocals
- Formerly of: Rebound!
- Website: www.myspace.com/eddierazaz

Ardalan Razaz Rahmati (Persian: اردلان رزاز رحمتى; born 21 December 1988), known as Eddie Razaz (ادى رزاز), is a Swedish singer. He was a former participant of Swedish Idol 2009 and finished sixth. Eddie Razaz and Rabih Jaber, yet another Idol participant, became a duo pop boy band as REbound! in 2010 with a number of hits on the Swedish charts. After the split-up of the band in April 2011, Eddie Razaz is continuing as a solo singer. In November 2012, he was signed to Warner Music Sweden. He has done also modelling and was featured in advertisements.

== Beginnings ==
Born in Stockholm to Iranian parents, he first auditioned for Swedish Idol in 2005 but was eliminated during the qualifying rounds. He also worked with a modeling agency.

== Idol 2009 ==
In 2009, he took part in TV4 Idol 2009, the sixth season of the Swedish version of Idol. This was his second, more successful, shot at the competition after not qualifying in 2005. In the 2009 edition of Idol, he reached Week 6 of the live shows before being eliminated and coming sixth overall.

He sang the following songs during the 2009 series:

- Audition: "Lonely No More" by Rob Thomas
- Qualifying semi-final: "Man in the Mirror" by Michael Jackson
- Qualifying final: "Hurtful" by Erik Hassle
- Week 1 (Club Idol): "Release Me" by Agnes Carlsson
- Week 2 (Michael Jackson): "They Don't Care About Us" by Michael Jackson
- Week 3 (Rock): "Beautiful Day" by U2
- Week 4 (Las Vegas): "Can't Take My Eyes Off You" by Frankie Valli
- Week 5 (International best track): "If You're Not the One" by Daniel Bedingfield
- Week 6 (Topplisten hits): "Curly Sue" by Takida as solo and "If Only You" (by Danny Saucedo feat. Therese) as a duo with Reza Ningtyas Lindh
- Eliminated finishing 6th overall

== In band REbound! ==
After the end of the Idol, Eddie Razaz paired with Rabih Jaber, a Swedish singer of Lebanese origin and another contestant on sixth season of the Swedish Idol to form Rebound! (often stylized as REbound! with Capital R standing for Rabih and capital E for Eddie) and ended up having a few hits, most notably the chart topping "Hurricane" that reached No. 1 of Sverigetopplistan, the official Swedish Singles chart on 7 May 2010. The band had follow up singles "Not Helpless" and "Psycho" before splitting up in April 2011.

== Solo music career ==
Razaz was reportedly preparing his debut solo album for release in 2012 and cooperating in this regard with Swedish rapper and songwriter Rebstar of Kurdish-Persian origin. No such album materialized.

Eddie Razaz took part in Melodifestivalen 2013 with the song "Alibi" written by Peter Boström and Thomas G:son in a bid to represent Sweden during Eurovision Song Contest 2013 to be held in Malmö, Sweden. He performed in the third semi-final held in Skellefteå Kraft Arena, Skellefteå on 16 February 2013, but did not qualify for the finals.

== Other careers ==
Razaz is also pursuing a modeling career. Many semi-nude pictures of his circulated around even before his appearances on Idol. They were taken by a modeling agency as he revealed in an interview with Swedish gay magazine QX. Because of the pictures, he enjoyed notable interest in many lifestyle and gay forums internationally. He also modeled for Tom Ford Eyewear with photography by Bingo Rimér.

== Personal life ==
In the May 2010 issue of the Swedish gay magazine QX, Eddie Razaz came out as gay. When asked about why he didn't come out while on Idol, he answered to QX's Anders Öhrman: "I have always lived openly and I have stood for it all my life. And my parents have really been a fantastic support and never had any problems with it. I am fortunate to have such good parents. But when you find yourself in the spotlight, questions like "coming out" comes up again. And I did not want to. It [coming out] should never be forced. But now I do not feel compelled, I like it here."

== Discography ==
=== Singles ===
With Rebound!

Title	Year	Peak positions	Album
Title	Year	SWE	Album
"Hurricane"	2010	1	Non-album single
"Not Helpless"	2010	—	Non-album single
"Not Helpless (Rink's If Only You Knew Remix)"	2010	—	Non-album single
"Psycho"	2011	—	Non-album single

Solo

Title	Year	Peak positions	Album
Title	Year	SWE	Album
"Alibi"	2013	47	Melodifestivalen 2013
