= Alibi (Eddie Razaz song) =

Single by Eddie Razaz
- Released: March 2013
- Recorded: 2013
- Genre: Pop, Dance music
- Label: Warner Music Sweden
- Songwriter(s): Thomas G:son; Peter Boström

Music video
- "Alibi" on YouTube

"Alibi" is a pop / dance song released in 2013 by Swedish singer of Persian origin Eddie Razaz. He had been a contestant in Swedish Idol 2009 finishing sixth and eventually forming the duo REbound! with fellow Idol contestant Rabih Jaber. After breaking-up, Razaz decided to go on with a solo career.

Razaz took part in Melodifestivalen 2013 on 16 February 2013, in a bid to represent Sweden in Eurovision Song Contest 2013 in Malmö, Sweden. The song was co-written by Thomas G:son and Peter Boström and performed by Razaz in the third semi-final leg of the competition, but it failed to move forward to the finale.

== Chart performance ==
Although the song failed to secure a spot in the national finals of Melodifestivalen, it garnered immense popularity among the Swedish public. As the competition drew to a close in March 2013, the song found its place on the prestigious Sverigetopplistan official Swedish Singles Chart. Notably, this achievement marked Razaz's inaugural appearance on the chart, following the disbandment of REbound!

== Charts ==
Chart (2013)	Peak position
Sweden (Sverigetopplistan)	47
