= Rooftop (album) =

Studio album by Ulrik Munther
- Released: March 6, 2013
- Recorded: 2012–2013
- Label: Universal Records Sweden

Ulrik Munther chronology
Ulrik Munther (2011)	Rooftop (2013)	Allt jag ville säga (2015)

Singles from Rooftop
- 1. "San Francisco Says Hello" Released: December 5, 2012; 2. "Tell the World I'm Here" Released: February 24, 2013; 3. "Requiem" Released: July 20, 2013

Rooftop is the second studio album from Swedish singer-songwriter Ulrik Munther released through Universal Music Sweden. Released on 6 March 2013 to coincide with his performance during Melodifestivalen 2013, it includes his rendition during the competition titled "Tell the World I'm Here" first performed on 23 February 2013 reaching the final stage of the competition finishing third in the finals held on 9 March 2013.

== Singles ==
- The first single from Rooftop was "San Francisco Says Hello", released on December 5, 2012 to iTunes with a single containing the radio edit and album version of the song.
- Munther's song for Melodifestivalen 2013, "Tell the World I'm Here", was released officially as the album's second single on February 24, 2013. It entered at #21 on the Swedish Singles Chart in its first week, before climbing to and peaking at #11 the next week.
- "Requiem" was released as the third single on July 20, 2013, with a single on iTunes containing two remixes of the song (one containing additional vocals from Swingfly), an acoustic version.

== Track listing ==
No.	Title	Writer(s)	Length
1.	"Tell the World I'm Here"	Peter Boström, Thomas G:son, Ulrik Munther	3:33
2.	"Crash Test Dummy"	Ulrik Munther, Johan Gustafson, Fredrik Häggstam, Sebastian Lundberg, Herbie Crichlow	3:06
3.	"San Francisco Says Hello"	Ulrik Munther, Martin Ekman	3:56
4.	"Glad I Found You"	Ulrik Munther, Robin Mortensen Lynch, Niklas Olovson	3:08
5.	"Requiem"	Ulrik Munther, Tony Nilsson, Fernando Fuentes	3:22
6.	"You&You"	Ulrik Munther, Christian Walz, Ana Diaz	3:45
7.	"Rooftop"	Ulrik Munther, Boström, Andreas Matsson	3:48
8.	"Symphony"	Walz, David Kocky Äström, Marten Tromm	3:30
9.	"Thousand Years"	Ulrik Munther, Matsson	3:17
10.	"I Think I Love You"	Ulrik Munther, Erik Hassle, Grizzly	3:27
11.	"8:45"	Ulrik Munther, Matsson	4:20

iTunes bonus track
No.	Title	Length
12.	"Dolphins"	3:18

Spotify bonus track
No.	Title	Length
12.	"Born To Get Older"	3:26

== Charts ==
Chart (2013)	Peak position
Swedish Albums (Sverigetopplistan)	4
