= En riktig jävla schlager =

Single by Ravaillacz
- A-side: "En riktig jävla schlager"
- Released: 2013
- Genre: schlager
- Songwriters: Kjell Jennstig, Leif Goldkuhl, Henrik Dorsin

"En riktig jävla schlager" is a song written by Kjell Jennstig, Leif Goldkuhl and Henrik Dorsin, and performed by Ravaillacz during Melodifestivalen 2013, where the song ended up 10th.

The song charted at Svensktoppen for five weeks. before leaving the chart.

== Charts ==
Chart (2013)	Peak position
Sweden (Sverigetopplistan)	18
