= Ulrik Munther (album) =

Studio album by Ulrik Munther
- Released: 24 September 2011
- Recorded: 2010–2011
- Label: Universal Records Sweden

Ulrik Munther chronology
Ulrik Munther (2011)	Rooftop (2013)

Singles from Ulrik Munther
- 1. "Boys Don't Cry" Released: December 29, 2010; 2. "Born This Way" Released: March 2, 2011; 3. "Moments Ago" Released: June 17, 2011; 4. "Soldiers" Released: February 25, 2012

Ulrik Munther is the self-titled debut studio album by Swedish singer-songwriter Ulrik Munther. It was released on 24 August 2011 in Sweden under the Universal Music record label and hit number one on the Swedish Albums Chart in its first week of release, staying at that position for one week. All of the songs were composed by Munther himself.

Munther re-released the album on 29 February 2012 after his participation in the Melodifestivalen 2012. It contains two more tracks; "Soldiers", which was performed at Melodifestivalen 2012 and the track "Fool".

== Singles ==
- Munther's debut single was "Boys Don't Cry", and was released on 29 December 2010. It first charted in the Swedish Singles Chart on July 14, 2011, entering at #42 before dropping out. It then re-entered on August 11 at its peak position of #31. The single release on iTunes contained the demo version of eventual album track "Life".
- "Born This Way" received a single release on iTunes on 2 March 2011, making it the second single from the album.
- "Moments Ago" was the third single from the album, released on 17 June 2011.
- The final single from Ulrik Munther was from the 2012 re-issue. "Soldiers" was the song Munther performed at Melodifestivalen 2012 and finished in third place with. It was released on 25 February 2012 and peaked at #6 in Sweden on its third week after entering at #53.

== Track listing ==
Credits adapted from the liner notes of Ulrik Munther.

No.	Title	Writer(s)	Length
1.	"Sticks and Stones"	Ulrik Munther, Aaberg, Debx2, D-Jax	3:32
2.	"Boys Don't Cry"	Munther, Aaberg, Debx2, D-Jax	3:12
3.	"King of Our Days"	Munther, Aaberg, Debx2, D-Jax	4:18
4.	"Moments Ago"	Munther, Aaberg, Debx2, D-Jax	3:53
5.	"Kill For Lies"	Munther, Aaberg, Debx2, D-Jax	3:39
6.	"Fake It"	Munther, Aaberg, Debx2, D-Jax	3:44
7.	"Alburn Road"	Munther, Aaberg, Debx2, D-Jax	3:42
8.	"The Box"	Munther, D-Jax	3:52
9.	"Heroes in Defeat (Change Your Mind)"	Munther, Aaberg, Debx2, D-Jax	2:53
10.	"Life"	Munther, D-Jax	3:51
Total length:			36:32

Bonus track
No.	Title	Writer(s)	Length
11.	"Born This Way"	Stefani Germanotta, Jeppe Laursen	3:35

iTunes bonus track
No.	Title	Length
12.	"In My Own Little Heaven"	3:18

Hidden bonus track
No.	Title	Length
12.	"The Scarecrow"	3:25

2012 re-issue
No.	Title	Writer(s)	Length
11.	"Soldiers"	Munther, Aaberg, Debx2, D-Jax	3:02
12.	"Fool"	Munther, Aaberg, Debx2, D-Jax	4:02
13.	"Born This Way"	Stefani Germanotta, Jeppe Laursen	3:35

== Charts ==
=== Weekly charts ===
Chart (2011)	Peak position
Swedish Albums (Sverigetopplistan)	1

=== Year-end charts ===
Chart (2011)	Position
Swedish Albums (Sverigetopplistan)	51
Chart (2012)	Position
Swedish Albums (Sverigetopplistan)	72

== Certifications ==
Region	Certification	Certified units/sales
Sweden (GLF)	Gold	20,000^{‡}
^{‡} Sales+streaming figures based on certification alone.
