= Jalla Dansa Sawa =

Single by Behrang Miri
- Released: March 2013
- Recorded: March 2013
- Genre: Pop
- Songwriter(s): Anderz Wrethov; Firas Razak Tuma; Tacfarinas Yamoun; Behrang Miri

"Jalla Dansa Sawa" (meaning Come on and dance together) is a 2013 song by Swedish singer of Iranian origin Behrang Miri which was performed in Melodifestivalen 2013. In the vocals, he is accompanied by Malmö local artists the American-Swede Loulou Lamotte and Italian-Swede Oscar Zia, a contestant in the 2012 series of Swedish X Factor.

A song co-written by Anderz Wrethov, Firas Razak Tuma, Tacfarinas Yamoun and by Behrang Miri himself, it is a trilingual song in Swedish, French and Arabic.

"Jalla dansa sawa" was first performed in the 2013 Melodifestivalen fourth semi-final held on 23 February 2013 in Malmö Arena, Malmö coming 3rd/4th that qualified it to Andra Chansen (Second Chance) round that was held in Löfbergs Lila Arena, Karlstad on 2 March 2013. In a duel with Anton Ewald song "Begging", it failed to move on to the finals of the competition.

Despite this, the song gained great popularity with the Swedish public and the single was released immediately after the competition reaching number four on Sverigetopplistan, the official Swedish Singles Chart.

== Music video ==
A music video was released with added English language lyrics replacing most of the basic Swedish lyrics with English ones, in addition to adding a long introduction footage in Persian language alluding to Behrang Miri's infancy. The music video ends with footage and slogans in Spanish language alluding to popular protests in Latin America. The music video also keeps most original refrain sections in Swedish, French and Arabic making the song even more appealing internationally.

The English language version music video is directed and produced by Fernando Illezca.

The music video makes additional references for Miri's activism in immigration issues, with further references to social justice, gentrification, racial discrimination, censorship and grass roots popular revolts, and other issues.

Personnel (music video)

- Director & producer: Fernando Illezca
- Cinematographer: Gabriel Mkrttchian
- Focus Puller: Dinis Rodrigues
- SteadyCam: Nestor Salazar
- Assistant: Tanvir Hossain
- Makeup: Nava Zolgharnian
- Choreography: Mona Razzaz
- Production company: Ferhango Film

== Charts ==
Chart (2013)	Peak position
Swedish Singles Chart	4
