= Sean Banan =

Iranian-Swedish comedian and musician

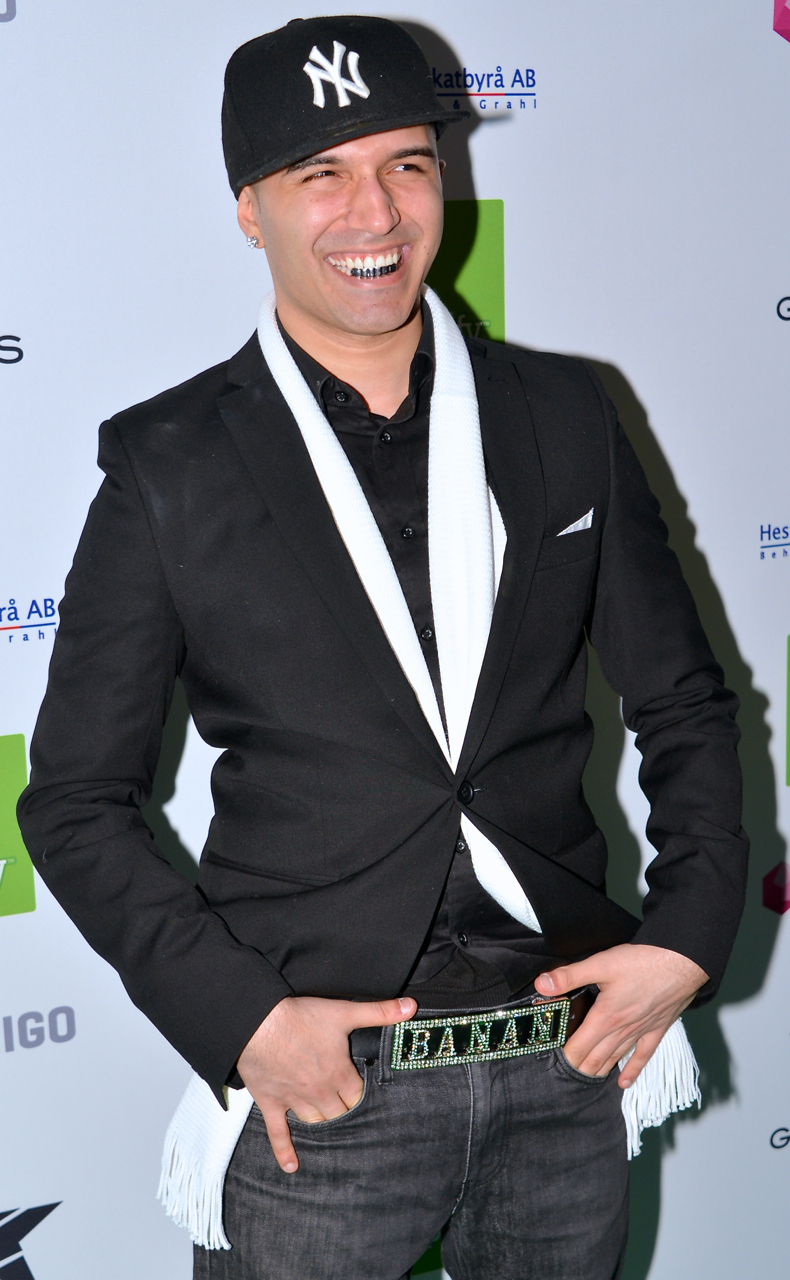
- Sean Banan during Grammis gala in Cirkus, Stockholm, 2013
- Born: Sina Samadi; 7 April 1985 (age 41); Iran

Comedy career
- Years active: 2006–present
- Medium: stand-up, dancer, television personality, musician
- Genres: Satire, improvisational comedy, observational comedy
- Website: www.seanbanan.se

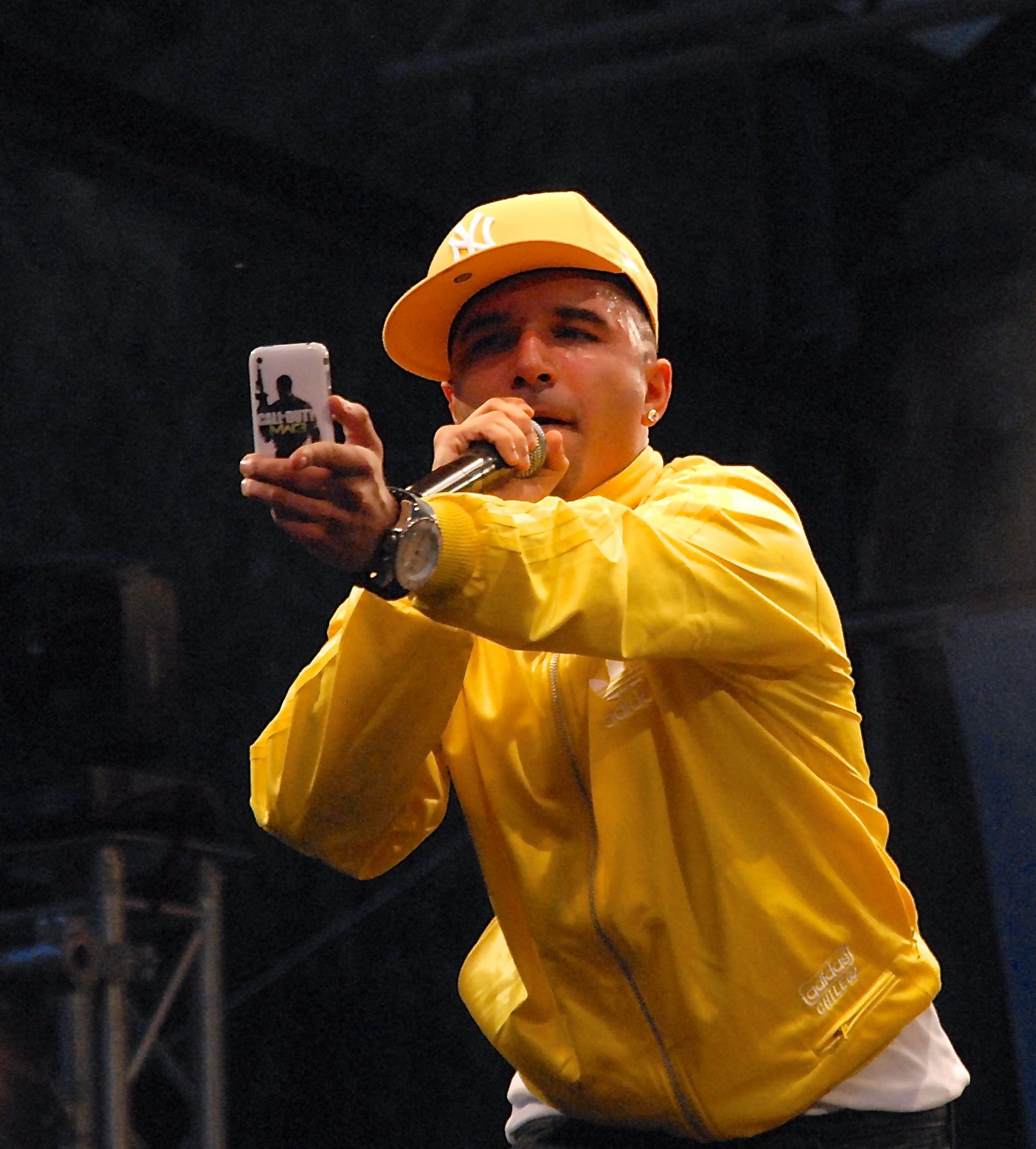
Sean Banan in Ung08 Festival in Stockholm, 2011

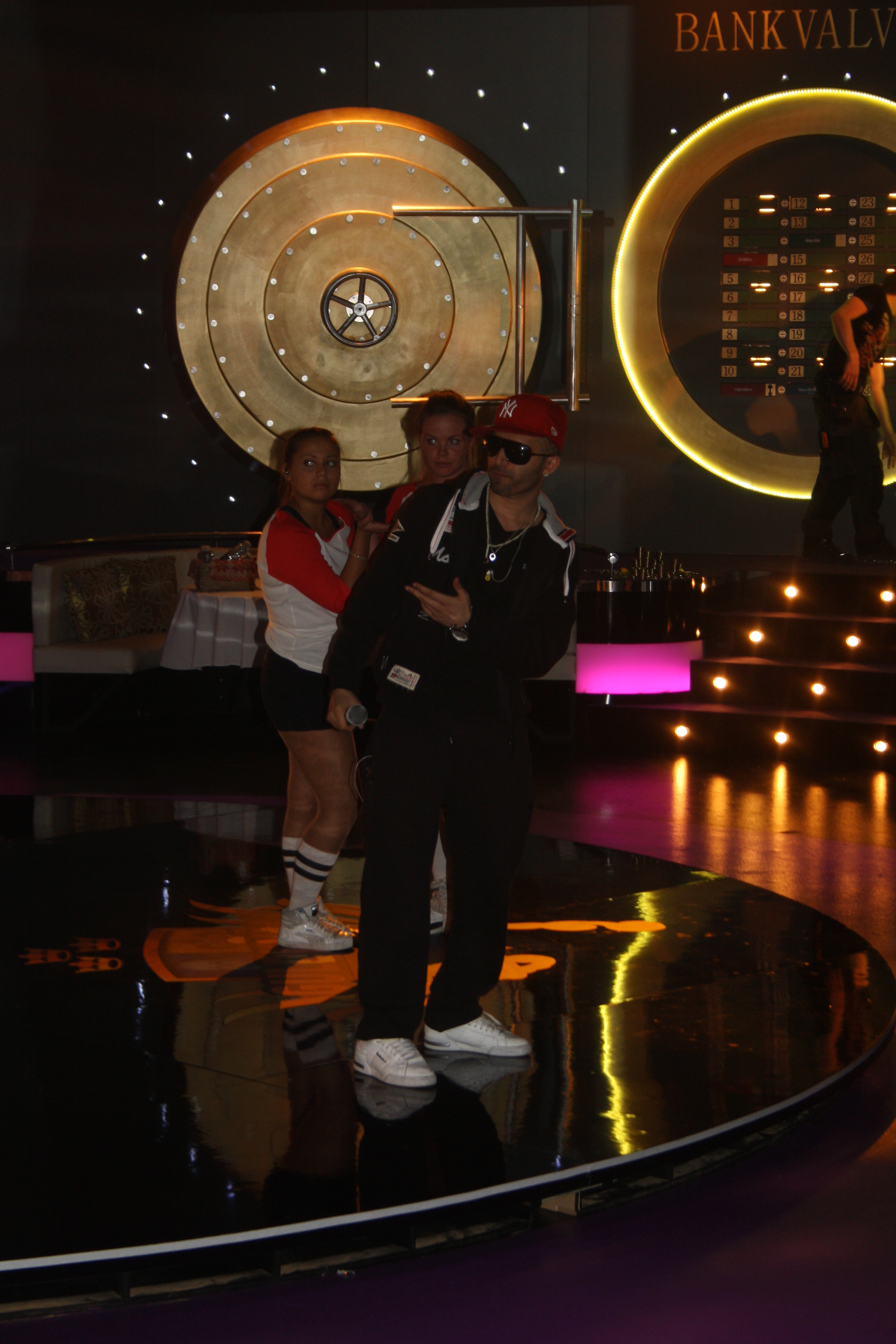
Sean Banan performing

Sina Samadi (born 7 April 1985), known by his stage name Sean Banan ("Sean Banana") is an Iranian-Swedish comedian and musician. His family immigrated to Sweden when he was 2 years old and resided in Gothenburg. Samadi took lessons in rumba, flamenco, rock, cha-cha-cha, ballet and street dance. He then worked as a choreographer and dance instructor. In 2006, he appeared on TV3's now defunct dance programme Floor Filler. He became an immediate internet phenomenon after appearing in an interview in 2007 after answering some questions about his preferences and said he preferred rumpa (buttocks) to breasts. Rumpa became a catch phrase he would use in many of his future gigs.

He played a travelling reporter in the 2010, comedy television show Cirkus Möller that aired on TV4. The same year he took part in the Kanal 5's programme Djävulsrallyt in its third series.

His 2010 single "Skaka Rumpa" was released on 16 June 2010, and entered the Swedish Singles Chart at No. 13 in its first week, topping at No. 8 the following week.

Samadi took part in Melodifestivalen 2012, with "Sean den förste Banan" that passed the Semi-final stage, but was eliminated in the "Second Chance" round without reaching the finals. But despite this, the song proved very popular reaching number 3 on Sverigetopplistan, the official Swedish Singles Chart.

In Melodifestivalen 2013, he took part with "Copacabanana". After performing in the semi-final in Scandinavium, Gothenburg, he came 1st and qualified directly to the final, where he finished in 6th place.

Samadi's first film Sean Banan inuti Seanfrika was released in 2012, and was panned by critics.

== Filmography ==
=== Appearances in films ===
- 2010: Skills as Stretch
- 2012: Sean Banan inuti Seanfrika as himself

=== Appearances in TV series ===
- 2006: Floor Filler (dance)
- 2010: Cirkus Möller (comedy)
- 2010: Djävulsrallyt
- 2010: Sommarkrysset
- 2011: Helt magiskt
- 2011: Äntligen fredag

== Discography ==
=== Albums ===
Year	Title	Peak Position (SWE)	Certifications
2012	Sean den förste Banan	3	GLF: Platinum
2013	Copacabanana	2	GLF: Gold
2014	En svensk klassiker	3	

=== Singles ===
Year	Title	Peak Position (SWE)	Certifications	Album
2010	"Skaka rumpa"	4	GLF: Platinum	
2010	"Puss puss"	54		
2010	"Gott nytt jul"	2	GLF: Platinum	
2011	"Händer i luft"	–		
2012	"Sean den förste Banan"	3		Sean den förste Banan
2013	"Copacabanana"	3	GLF: 2× Platinum	Copacabanana
2016	"Gamerz"	—		Non album singles
2018	"Bananaman"	—		Non album singles
