= Tell the World I'm Here =

2013 Ulrik Munther song

Single by Ulrik Munther

from the album Rooftop
- Released: March 2013
- Recorded: 2013
- Genre: Pop
- Label: Universal Music
- Songwriter(s): Thomas G:son; Peter Boström; Ulrik Munther

Ulrik Munther singles chronology
"San Francisco Says Hello" (2013)	"Tell the World I'm Here" (2013)	"Requiem" (2013)

"Tell the World I'm Here" is a pop song released in 2013 by Swedish singer songwriter Ulrik Munther. He took part in Melodifestivalen 2013 on 9 March that year, in a bid to represent Sweden in Eurovision Song Contest 2013 in Malmö, Sweden. The song came third overall after Robin Stjernberg won with "You" and Yohio was runner-up with "Heartbreak Hotel".

== Charts ==
Chart (2013)	Peak position
Sweden (Sverigetopplistan)	11
