= Only the Dead Fish Follow the Stream =

Single by Louise Hoffsten
- Released: 2013
- Genre: Blues
- Label: Warner Music
- Songwriter(s): Louise Hoffsten, Sandra Bjurman, Stefan Örn

"Only the Dead Fish Follow the Stream" is a song written by Louise Hoffsten, Stefan Örn and Sandra Bjurman, and performed by Louise Hoffsten at Melodifestivalen 2013, reaching the final where it ended up 5th with 85 points (36 from the international jury, 49 from the televoters).

== Charts ==
Chart (2013)	Peak position
Sweden (Sverigetopplistan)	31
