= Allt jag ville säga =

Studio album by Ulrik Munther
- Released: May 13, 2015
- Label: Universal Records Sweden

Ulrik Munther chronology
Rooftop (2013)	Allt jag ville säga (2015)

Singles from Allt jag ville säga
- 1. "Jag vet inte hur man gör" Released: October 27, 2014; 2. "Nån gång" Released: March 4, 2015

Allt jag ville säga is the third studio album from Swedish singer-songwriter Ulrik Munther released on Universal Music Sweden. The album was Munther's first with lyrics written in Swedish. He collaborated with Swedish novelist Jonas Gardell who wrote the lyrics, while Munther composed the music.

== Singles ==
- The first single from Allt jag ville säga was "Jag vet inte hur man gör", released on October 27, 2014.
- "Nån gång" was released as the second single on March 4, 2015.
- From May 8, 2015 to its release date, five additional songs from the album were released as singles. The five songs were the following: "Allt jag ville säga", "Närmare himlen, Ditt andetag", "Förlåt att jag frågar" and "Alltid leva, aldrig dö".

== Track listing ==
No.	Title	Writer(s)	Length
1.	"Närmare himlen"	Ulrik Munther, Jonas Gardell	3:48
2.	"Ditt andetag"	Munther, Gardell	3:56
3.	"Nån gång"	Munther, Gardell	3:20
4.	"Allt jag ville säga"	Munther, Gardell	4:11
5.	"Alltid leva, aldrig dö"	Munther, Gardell	3:14
6.	"Förråda dig"	Munther, Gardell	3:21
7.	"Förlåt att jag frågar"	Munther, Gardell	3:43
8.	"Jag vet inte hur man gör"	Munther, Gardell	3:50
9.	"Du är inte ensam"	Munther, Gardell	3:46
10.	"Sparkar mitt liv"	Munther, Gardell	4:19
11.	"Monster"	Munther, Gardell	3:58
Total length:			41:26

== Charts ==
Chart (2014)	Peak position
Swedish Albums (Sverigetopplistan)	3
