= Sean Banan inuti Seanfrika =

- Starring: Sean Banan; Dr. Alban; Kikki Danielsson; Johannes Brost
- Release date: 15 February 2012 (Sweden)
- Country: Sweden
- Language: Swedish

Sean Banan inuti Seanfrika (en:Sean Banan inside Seanfrica) is a 2012 Swedish comedy film starring comedian Sina Samadi as Sean Banan, Dr. Alban, Kikki Danielsson and Johannes Brost.

== Plot ==
A guy named Sean Banan heads to Africa with a diva to record a music video. What was supposed to be a simple trip turns out to be a crazy road trip with boat hunts, wild animals and many strange people. Losing all his money after a mysterious stockbroker goes missing, they go on an adventure around Africa to find the mysterious stockbroker and his money.

== Cast ==
- Sean Banan as himself
- Kikki Danielsson as herself
- Dr. Alban as himself
- Johannes Brost as Swedish Ambassador
- Armando Sando Vilanculos as Director
- António Rocha as Hotel Manager
- Fátima Pedro as Fatima
- Benedito Duna as Entourage
- Inácio Duna as Entourage
- Constantino Mateus as Entourage
- Francisco Ihaca as Albans Bodyguard
- Inácio Ricardo Chirute as Postal Worker
- Miguel Alfredo Manjate as Postal Worker
- Jerónimo Eduardo as Postal Worker

== Reception ==
The movie was unanimously panned by Swedish reviewers, several describing it as among the worst films produced in Sweden. Sydsvenskan called it an insult to paying audiences and Ronny Svensson of TV4 describing it as utterly untalented.
