= Ulrik Munther =

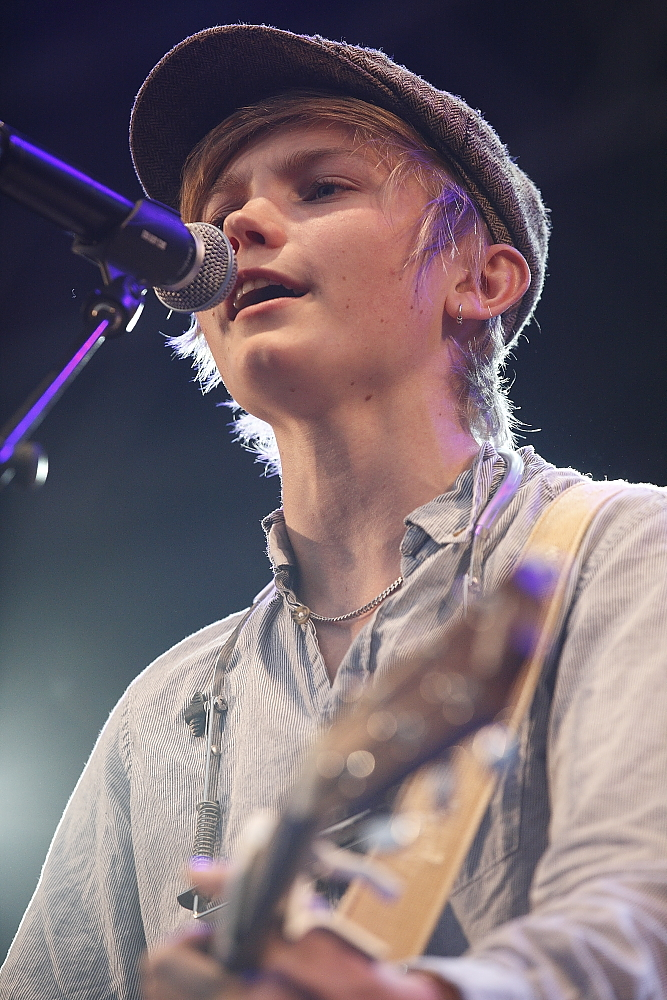
- Ulrik Munther performing in Helsingborgsfestivalen

Background information
- Born: Jens Ulrik Munther; 18 February 1994 (age 32)
- Origin: Kungsbacka, Sweden
- Genres: Pop, Rock
- Occupations: Singer, songwriter
- Instruments: Vocals, guitar, piano, drums, harmonica
- Years active: 2009 – present
- Label: Universal
- Member of: Björnzone
- Spouse: Beata Wallgren (m. 2023)

Jens Ulrik Munther (born 18 February 1994) is a Swedish singer-songwriter, actor and multi-instrumentalist signed to Universal Music Sweden. His debut studio album Ulrik Munther, was released on 24 August 2011 and peaked at number 1 in Sweden. His second studio album Rooftop, was released on 6 March 2013 and peaked at number 4 in Sweden.

== Early life ==
Munther started very young playing in different youth rock bands around Kungsbacka, just outside Gothenburg. After playing rock covers for some time, he started writing his own material and toured extensively promoting his YouTube songs. He also appeared on a number of Swedish television shows.

== Career ==
=== 2009: Lilla Melodifestivalen / MGP Nordic ===
At age 15, he took part in Lilla Melodifestivalen, a national Swedish competition for young singers to qualify to the MGP Nordic (Melody Grand Prix Nordic) competition with his own song "En vanlig dag" ("An Ordinary Day"). After winning the Swedish contest, he went on to win the title at the MGP Nordic competition in which participants from Denmark, Norway, Sweden and Finland competed.

=== 2010–12: Ulrik Munther ===
After 1 year from winning the MGP Nordic title, Munther took part in Metro Music Challenge again with his own composition "Life" coming second. Producer Johan Åberg, seeing the potential, started a musical co-operation with Munther. After the song "Boys Don't Cry" was leaked on the internet, a number of international record company affiliates contacted him, with Universal Records Sweden eventually signing him in September 2010. He also toured the United States, Britain and Continental Europe. He is also well known for his cover of Lady Gaga's "Born This Way" after Perez Hilton posted the video on his website. Munther has also participated in SVT's Bobster program entitled Humorgalan as part of charity for UNICEF in May 2010. There he sang "My Generation" together with Peter Johansson, Rock-Olga and others. Munther has also been involved in SVTB's Sommarlov hosted by Malin Olsson. He has also appeared in Allsång på Skansen and Lotta på Liseberg festivals in Summer 2011. On 24 August 2011, he released his self-titled debut album Ulrik Munther that went straight to No. 1 on the Swedish Album Charts on its week of release. The album was recorded in Stockholm, and part in his own home. He appears with Caroline Costa in a single entitled "Je t'ai menti" which is the French version of "Kill for Lies". Released on 19 December 2011, it entered the French Singles Chart in February 2012.

==== Melodifestivalen 2012 ====
In 2012, Munther participated in the second semi-final of Melodifestivalen 2012 with the song "Soldiers". He was among the two winners of the night, managing to get to the contest's final, that took place on 10 March 2012 at the Globe Arena in Stockholm. Loreen with her song "Euphoria" won not only the Melodifestivalen but the Eurovision Song Contest 2012 as well. Munther and "Soldiers" finished 3rd overall in the Melodifestivalen behind Loreen and runner-up Danny Saucedo.

=== 2012–13: Rooftop ===
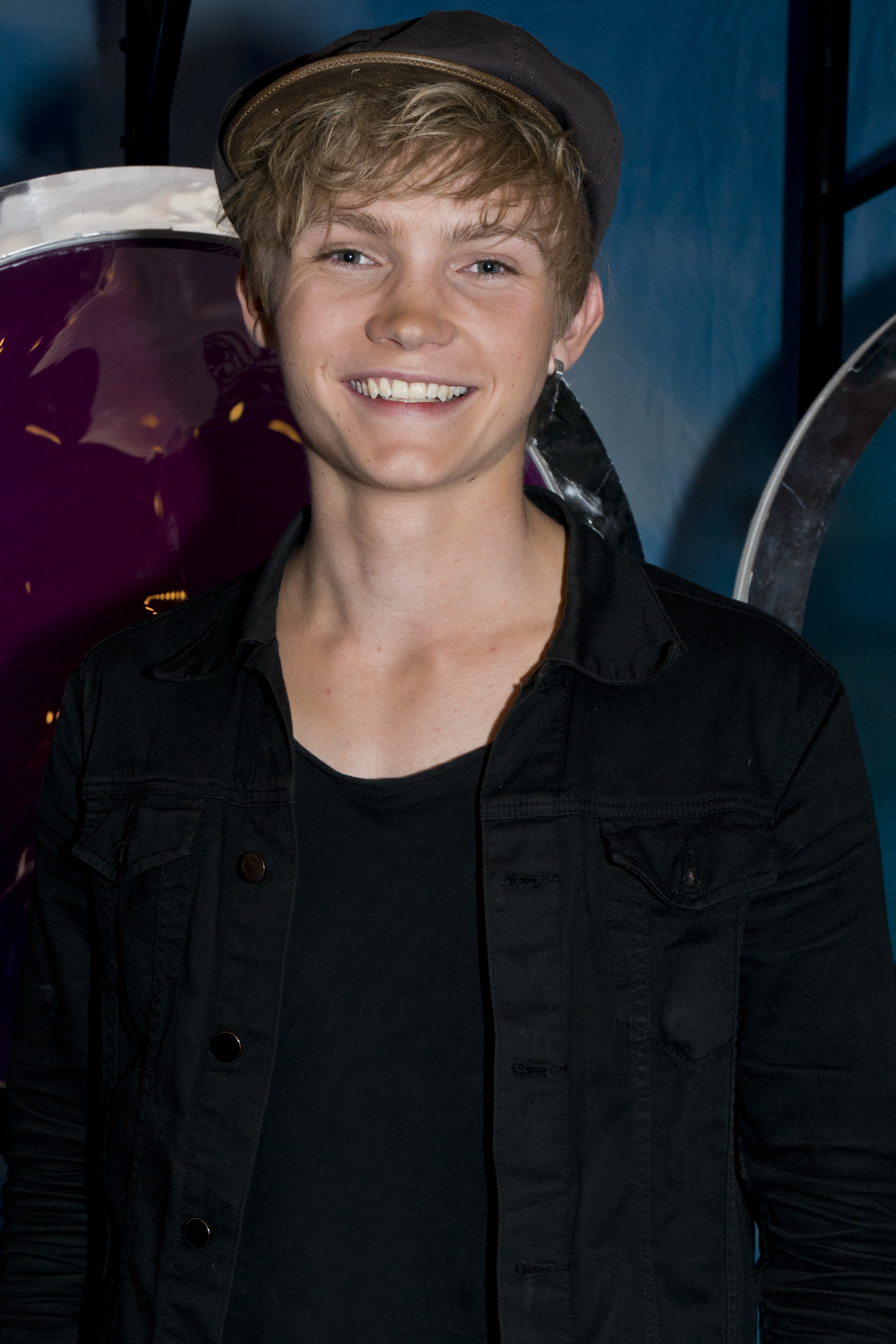
Munther at Sommarkrysset 2013.

On 21 December 2012, the music video for his single "San Francisco Says Hello" came out on YouTube which was filmed in San Francisco earlier that month. It also received more attention when Perez Hilton posted it on his Twitter page three weeks later.

==== Melodifestivalen 2013 ====
In 2013, Munther participated in the 4th semi-final Melodifestivalen 2013 on 23 February 2013 in Malmö, Sweden singing the song "Tell the World I'm Here" co-written by Munther with songwriters Thomas G:son and Peter Boström. Munther again finished 3rd overall in the Melodifestivalen behind Robin Stjernberg and Yohio. Shortly after, Munther released his second album Rooftop, which reached No. 4 on the Swedish Album Charts. The album was preceded by third-place 2013 Melodifestivalen entry "Tell the World I'm Here", with "Requiem" being released as the third single afterwards.

== Personal life ==
Ulrik continues to be private about his personal life, however when pressed by a journalist at Melodifestivalen 2013, Ulrik stated he was single. Despite him being so private, he told Perfect Day Media in their podcast Sommartankar, that he is now living with his girlfriend Beata Wallgren in Stockholm. The two wed in 2023 and their first child was born in September 2025.

== Discography ==
=== Albums ===
List of studio albums
Title	Details	Peak chart positions		Certifications
Title	Details	SWE	JPN	Certifications
Ulrik Munther	Released: 24 August 2011; Label: Universal Music; Format: CD and digital download	1	—	GLF: Gold
Rooftop	Released: 6 March 2013; Label: Universal Music; Format: CD and digital download	4	207	
Allt jag ville säga	Released: 13 May 2015; Label: Universal Music; Format: CD and digital download	3	—	
Put Your Self Out There	Released: 30 April 2021; Label: Dysther; Format: CD and digital download	—	—	

=== Extended plays ===
List of extended plays
Title	Extended play details
Shine a Light - a Gift for You	Released: 28 November 2012; Label: Nippon Columbia; Formats: CD and digital download
Are You Alright?	Released: 20 April 2018; Label: Dysther; Formats: digital download

=== Singles ===
List of singles
Title	Year	Peak chart positions				Certifications	Album
Title	Year	SWE	BEL (Wa)	FRA	JPN	Certifications	Album
"Boys Don't Cry"	2010	31	—	—	—	GLF: Gold	Ulrik Munther
"Born This Way"	2011	—	—	—	—		Ulrik Munther
"Moments Ago"	2011	20	—	—	—		Ulrik Munther
"Je t'ai menti (Kill for Lies)" (with Caroline Costa)	2011	—	6	107	—		J'irai
"Soldiers"	2012	6	—	—	—	GLF: Platinum	Ulrik Munther
"Sticks and Stones"	2012	—	—	—	—		Ulrik Munther
"San Francisco Says Hello"	2013	—	—	—	—		Rooftop
"Tell the World I'm Here"	2013	11	—	—	40	GLF: Gold	Rooftop
"Requiem"	2013	—	—	—	—		Rooftop
"Jag vet inte hur man gör"	2014	—	—	—	—		Allt jag ville säga
"Nån gång"	2015	—	—	—	—		Allt jag ville säga
"Alltid leva, aldrig dö"	2015	—	—	—	—		Allt jag ville säga
"Närmare himlen"	2015	—	—	—	—		Allt jag ville säga
"Coffee in Shanghai"	2017	—	—	—	—		Non-album single
"Before"	2018	— (Note: "Before" did not enter the Swedish Singles Chart, but peaked at number six on the Swedish Heatseekers chart.)	—	—	—		Are You Alright?
"Say Goodbye"	2018	—	—	—	—		Are You Alright?
"I Don't Wanna Talk Right Now"	2018	—	—	—	—		Are You Alright?
"Frank Ocean"	2018	—	—	—	—		Are You Alright?
"Daughter"	2018	—	—	—	—		Are You Alright?
"Are You Alright?"	2018	—	—	—	—		Are You Alright?
"Gloom."	2020	—	—	—	—		Put Your Self Out There
"Man in Need"	2020	—	—	—	—		Put Your Self Out There
"C'est la vie"	2020	—	—	—	—		Put Your Self Out There
"Don't Worry"	2020	—	—	—	—		Put Your Self Out There
"Jag älskar dig" (featuring Maia Hirasawa)	2021	—	—	—	—		Put Your Self Out There
"Come Find Me"	2021	—	—	—	—		Put Your Self Out There
"—" denotes a single that did not chart or was not released.

== Filmography ==
Year	Title	Role	Notes
2015	The Here After	John	

Documentaries

- 2012: Big in Japan
