= Soldiers (Ulrik Munther song) =

Single by Ulrik Munther

from the album Ulrik Munther (2012 Version)
- Released: March 2012
- Recorded: 2012
- Genre: Pop
- Label: Universal Music
- Songwriter(s): Ulrik Munther; Johan Åberg; Linnea Deb; Joy Deb; David Jackson

Ulrik Munther singles chronology
"Je t'ai menti" (2011)	"Soldiers" (2012)	"San Francisco Says Hello" (2013)

"Soldiers" is a pop song released in 2012 by Swedish singer-songwriter Ulrik Munther. He took part in Melodifestivalen 2012 on 11 February that year with the song, in a bid to represent Sweden in Eurovision Song Contest 2012 in Baku, Azerbaijan. The song finished third overall after Loreen won with "Euphoria" and Danny Saucedo was runner-up with "Amazing".

== Charts ==
=== Weekly charts ===
Chart (2012)	Peak position
Sweden (Sverigetopplistan)	6

=== Year-end charts ===
Chart (2012)	Position
Sweden (Sverigetopplistan)	86
