= Gunnar Hoffsten =

- Born: 7 December 1923; Stockholm, Sweden
- Died: 11 September 2010
- Genres: jazz
- Instruments: trumpet; piano

Nils Gunnar Hoffsten (7 December 1923, Stockholm – 11 September 2010) was a Swedish composer, bandleader and jazz musician (trumpet, piano). He was the father of Karin Hoffsten, the singer Louise Hoffsten, the artist Lars Hoffsten, and brother of the actress Rut Hoffsten.

== Biography ==
In 1946 together with tenor saxophonist Hans Fromholtz, he formed his first own orchestra. Just a year later they were at Nalen in Stockholm and played in an orchestra competition held in collaboration with the Orkester Journalen. Hoffsten's orchestra won and the jury's motivation was: "Good comp, equally good soloists and nice arrangements in good performance".

The first recordings made Gunnar Hoffsten's orchestra for the record company Cupol in 1949 and 1951. His own composition Cupol Boogie is also featured in Caprice's collection of Swedish Jazz History. He had great success with his composition "Utan dej" (Without you) with lyrics by Tryggve Arnesson. It was recorded with Sonia Sjöbeck, accompanied by Åke Jelving's orchestra in 1952. The Swedish publisher Gehrmans sold out the rights to an American music publisher entitled I Confess. The English text was written by Jack Lawrence. It became a real hit in the US. Sarah Vaughan recorded it, but it was Perry Como made it a huge seller. His recording was sold in over 750,000 copies (78-discs). His recording peaked at the time of the 1953 Billboards top list.

== Honors ==
- 1947: Winner of an orchestra competition held in collaboration with Orkester Journalen.
