= Louise Hoffsten =

Swedish songwriter, musician and singer

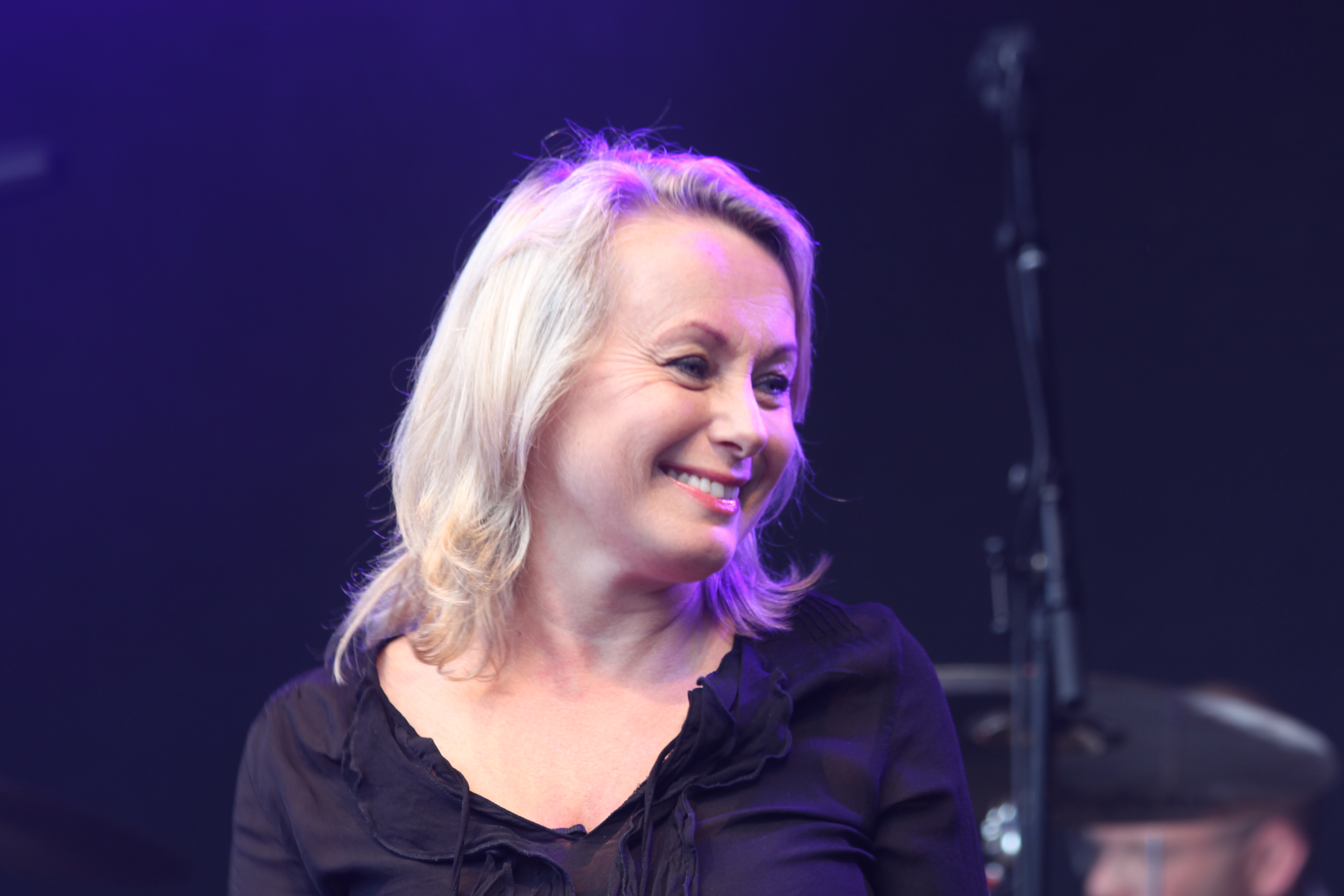
- Louise Hoffsten live on July 4, 2013.

Background information
- Born: November 6, 1965 (age 60); Linköping, Sweden
- Genres: blues, rock, jazz
- Occupations: musician, singer, songwriter
- Instrument: harmonica

Louise Hoffsten (born September 6, 1965) is a Swedish songwriter, musician and singer spanning several genres, notably rock, blues, folk and pop.

== Biography ==
Hoffsten was born in Linköping, Sweden. Her father, Gunnar Hoffsten, was also a musician and played the trumpet in a jazz band.

From her first recordings, Hoffsten's music and stage act have weaved together rock, folk and blues influences, while sometimes moving into R'n'B and jazz territory, unified by her earthy, slightly operatic singing style and driving, lean grooves. Like many blues singers she plays the harmonica as well, a recurrent element in her songs; she is arguably the most well-known and recognized female blues singer of contemporary Sweden. She has built a wide following in her native land, has won several awards and currently resides in Stockholm. She participated in Melodifestivalen 2013 with the song "Only the Dead Fish Follow the Stream".

Four songs from her sixth studio album 6 (1995), "Dance On Your Grave", "Box Full Of Faces", "Miracle", and "Nice Doin' Business", were featured on the American primetime soap opera Melrose Place. In 1999, American country artist Faith Hill recorded a cover of Hoffsten's "Bringing Out the Elvis", which Hill included on her album Breathe, one of the best-selling country albums of all time.

In 1996, Hoffsten was diagnosed with multiple sclerosis, but despite the complications and occasional depressions (mirrored in the book/record Blues), she continues to write, tour and perform music. On January 21, 2015, she released her second book En näve grus (a fist of gravel), which was co-written by Lena Katarina Swanberg. In 2018, she appeared on Så mycket bättre on TV4.

== Discography ==
=== Albums ===
- 1987: Genom eld och vatten
- 1988: Stygg
- 1989: Yeah, Yeah
- 1991: Message of Love
- 1993: Rhythm & Blonde
- 1995: 6
- 1996: Kära du
- 1999: Beautiful, But Why?
- 2004: Knäckebröd Blues (Remix and re-release of the Blues CD, 1997)
- 2005: From Linköping to Memphis
- 2007: Så speciell
- 2009: På andra sidan Vättern
- 2012: Looking for Mr. God
- 2014: Bringing Out the Elvis
- 2015: L
- 2017: Röster ur mörkret
- 2022: Crossing the Border

Compilation albums

- 2002: Collection 1991–2002

Live albums

- 2003: Louise Hoffsten live med Folkoperans Orkester

=== Singles and EPs ===
- 1987: "Genom vatten, genom eld" (Vinyl)
- 1987: "Ge upp, lägg av" (Vinyl)
- 1988: "Längtans röst" (Vinyl)
- 1988: "Vin av frihet" (Vinyl)
- 1989: "Opium för dig" (Vinyl)
- 1989: "Hon gör allt för dig" (Vinyl)
- 1990: "Yeah Yeah" (Vinyl)
- 1991: "Message of Love" (Vinyl)
- 1991: "Warm & Tender Love" (Vinyl)
- 1991: "Slowburn" (Vinyl)
- 1993: "All About Numbers" (CD)
- 1993: "Hit Me with Your Lovething" (CD & Maxi)
- 1993: "Let the Best Man Win" (CD)
- 1993: "When the Blue is Gone" (CD)
- 1993: "For Your Love" (CD)
- 1994: "Padded Bra" (CD)
- 1995: "Nice Doin' Business" (CD)
- 1995: "Dance on Your Grave" (CD)
- 1995: "Explain It to My Heart" (CD)
- 1995: "Healing Rain" (CD)
- 1996: "Det sorgsna hjärtat" (CD, ft. Lasse Englund & Esbjörn Svensson Trio)
- 1997: "Kära du, jag är ju bunden" (CD, Promo, ft. Lasse Englund & Esbjörn Svensson Trio)
- 1999: "Nowhere in This World" (CD)
- 2000: "Try a Little Harder" (CD)
- 2000: "Fire Is a Good Thing" (CD)
- 2002: "Sockerkompis" (CD)
- 2005: "My Favourite Lie" (CDr, Promo)
- 2005: "Shut Up & Kiss Me" (CDr, Promo)
- 2008: "Stumbled into Heaven" (CD, Promo, ft. Sulo (3))
- 2013: "Only the Dead Fish Follow the Stream" (CD, Melodifestivalen 2013)
- 2018: "Lovesick" (CD)
- 2019: "Tease Me" (CD)

== Books, CDs, DVDs ==
Others

- 1997: Blues (book with CD record)
- 1998: Tilde & tiden (children's story narrated by Louise Hoffsten)
- 2015: En näve grus (book co-written by Lena Katarina Swanberg)

Soundtracks

- 1995 Women of the House (TV) Ep. 8: The Afternoon Wife (writer: "Shut Up And Kiss Me")
- 1996 Barb Wire (performer, writer: "Miracle")
- 1996 The Associate (performer, writer: "Nice Doin' Business")
- 1996 Just Your Luck (performer, writer: "Bebop and Lulu")
- 1996 Baywatch (season 7) (TV) Ep. 1: Shark Fever (performer, writer: "Nice Doin' Business")
- 1997 Baywatch (season 7) (TV) Ep. 12: Bachelor of the Month (performer, writer: "Bringing Out the Elvis in Me")
- 1998 Baywatch (season 8) (TV) Ep. 20: Bon Voyage (performer, writer: "Padded Bra")
- 1998 Just a Little Harmless Sex (performer, writer: "Dance On Your Grave")
- 1999 Cupid (TV) Ep. 14: The Children's Hour (performer, writer: "Let the Best Man Win")
- 1999 Coming Soon (performer, writer: "Hit Me With Your Love Thing")
- 2006 American Idol (season 5) (TV) Top 9 – Country (writer: "Bringing Out the Elvis in Me")
