= Rabih Jaber =

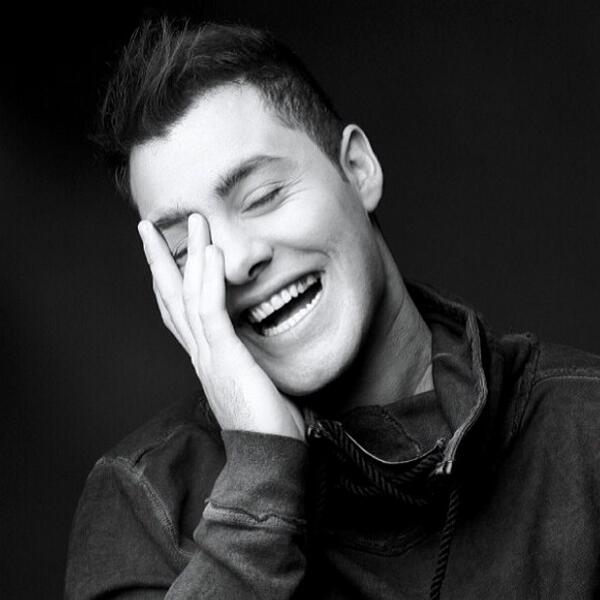
- Rabih Jaber

Background information
- Born: Rabih Mahmoud Jaber; 5 August 1987 (age 38)
- Origin: Lebanon
- Genres: POP; Electronica; EDM
- Occupations: Songwriter; Singer; Artist
- Instrument: Vocals
- Years active: 2009–present

Rabih Jaber (in Arabic ربيع جابر) (full name Rabih Mahmoud Jaber; born 5 August 1987, in Lebanon), also known by his simply Rabih is a Swedish singer of Lebanese origin. He is a former participant of Swedish Idol 2009, where he finished in seventh place. Jaber and Eddie Razaz, yet another Idol participant, became a duo pop boy band as Rebound! in 2010 with a number of hits on the Swedish charts. After the split-up of the duo in April 2011, Jaber continued for a while as a solo singer. He has of recent years made a career as a songwriter for other artists.

== Life and career ==
=== 1987–2009: Early life ===
Rabih Jaber immigrated with his family to Sweden when he was just 2 years old. They resided in Lycksele. An active sportsman, he was a striker in a Swedish soccer team playing in the Swedish Division III.

=== 2009: Idol ===
In 2009, he took part in TV4 Idol 2009, the sixth season of the Swedish version of Idol and finished 7th overall.

He sang the following songs during the competition:

- First audition: "Waiting on the World to Change" by John Mayer
- Qualifying semi-final: "With You" by Chris Brown
- Qualifying final: "Stand by Me" by Ben E. King
- Week 1 (Club Idol): "When Love Takes Over" by David Guetta and Kelly Rowland
- Week 2 (Michael Jackson): "You Are Not Alone" by Michael Jackson
- Week 3 (Rock): "Driving One of Your Cars" by Lisa Miskovsky
- Week 4 (Las Vegas): "That's Amore" by Dean Martin
- Week 5 (International best track) "All My Life" by K-Ci & JoJo
- Eliminated finishing 7th overall.

Rabih Jaber's live performance of Michael Jackson's "You Are Not Alone" during Idol 2009 became a hit that stayed one week in the Swedish Singles Chart of 23 October 2009 at No. 44

=== 2010: Let's Dance ===
In 2010, Rabih Jaber took part in the fifth season of Let's Dance 2010 the Swedish version of Strictly Come Dancing, broadcast on the Swedish television channel TV4 in January to March 2010. In weeks 1 and 2, his dancing partner was Maria Lindberg. In the inaugural week, he danced the valse on the tunes of "The Last Waltz" sung by Engelbert Humperdinck finishing 8th among 12 contestants. In week 2, he danced the rumba on the tunes of Bobby Vinton's "Sealed with a Kiss" finishing last of 12 contestants.

In weeks 3 and 4 his dancing part was Oksana Spichak. In week 3 he danced the "quickstep" to the tune of Alesha Dixon song "The Boy Does Nothing" finishing 9th among 11 contestants. He was in danger of elimination in week 3 and was confronted by comedian Peter Wahlbeck and his dancing partner Maria Bild, but Jaber passed to the following round. In week 4 he danced the pasodoble on the tunes of "Hurtful" by Eric Hassle finishing 7th among 10 contestants.

In week 5, his earlier dancing partner Maria Lindberg returned. Both danced the cha-cha-cha on Lipps Inc.'s "Funky Town". He finished 7th among 9 contestants. He was put in danger of elimination and couldn't pass through against the poet and writer Marcus Birro and his dancing partner Helena Fransson. Rabih Jaber was eliminated from the competition finishing ninth overall in the season.

=== 2010–2011: Rebound! ===
After the Idol, Rabih Jaber paired with a Swedish singer of Iranian origin and another contestant on sixth season of the Swedish Idol Eddie Razaz to form Rebound! (often stylized as REbound! with Capital R standing for Rabih and capital E for Eddie)

They released their debut single named "Hurricane" on 12 April 2010. It reached No. 1 on the Swedish Singles Chart for 7 May 2010.

The follow-up singles were "Not Helpless" and "Psycho". Their debut album was to follow in 2011 but it never materialized. The duo announced the split-up of the group in two posts on the official website of the group on 30 April and 1 May 2011. They both declared that they were pursuing solo careers.

=== 2011–2014: Solo career ===
After the split-up, Rabih Jaber is continuing as a solo artist.

Jaber released his solo single "Millionaire" in summer 2011 produced by Robbin "Raaban" Söderlund who has produced other materials from Rabih In June 2015, he released the bilingual Arab/English single "Habibi Hayati" (meaning My love, my life in Arabic).

In 2011, Jaber released the charity single "Leave the World Behind" with proceeds going to Karen Gebraeb Memorial Fund, after she was brutally murdered on 3 October 2011, while serving as a prison officer. Karen had been a fan of Rabih Jaber's music and came to a number of his concerts.

=== 2014: The Voice Ahla Sawt ===
In 2014, he auditioned to the second season of the pan-Arab version of The Voice called The Voice Ahla Sawt broadcast on MBC. In the blind audition, he sang "I Believe I Can Fly". Three of the four judges, Kadhim Al-Saher (Iraq), Saber Rebaï (Tunisia) and Sherine (Egypt) turned their chairs, with Assi El Helani (Lebanon) the only dissenting judge that didn't turn his chair. He was presented to the audience as a Lebanese-Swedish contestant and was the only contestant from Europe in that season's competition. In the Battle Round, he sang "Rule the World" and in the following round "Just the Way You Are" before being eliminated. After The Voice Ahla Sawt, he took part in a number of Lebanese and pan-Arab entertainment shows. He also released a bilingual Arabic/English duet titled "Nazra" (in Arabic نظرة) with the Lebanese singer Assi El Helani.

=== 2016–present: Songwriter ===
In 2016 Rabih Jaber signed an exclusive worldwide publishing agreement with EKKO Music Rights Europe.

== Discography ==
=== As a songwriter ===
- 2017: Henrik Høven feat. Andreyun – "Gotta Move On”
- 2017: Zhana Bergendorff – Dokrai
- 2016: Justice Crew – Pop Dat Buckle

=== Solo Artist ===
- 2009: "You Are Not Alone" (a release during Idol) (reached No. 44 in the Swedish Singles Chart)
- 2011: "Grenade" (Raaban feat. Rabih)
- 2011: "Millionaire"
- 2011: "Leave the World Behind"
- 2012: "Om du vill se mig"
- 2013: "Pyromanen"
- 2014: "Nazra" (in Arabic نظرة) (with Assi El Hellani)
- 2015: "Don't Wanna Wake Up"
- 2015: "Habibi Hayati"
- 2016: "Heartbeat"

=== With Rebound! ===
- 2010: "Hurricane" (reached No. 1 in the Swedish Singles Chart)
- 2010: "Not Helpless"
- 2010: "Not Helpless" (Rink's If Only You Knew Remix)
- 2011: "Psycho"

=== Featured in ===
- 2019: "Mamma" (CLUEE featuring Rabih Jaber)
