= Ravaillacz =

- Origin: Sweden
- Genres: schlager
- Years active: 2013-
- Labels: Lionheart
- Members: Tommy Körberg, Claes Malmberg, Johan Rabaeus, Mats Ronander

Ravaillacz is a superquartet from Sweden, which participated at Melodifestivalen 2013 with the charting song "En riktig jävla schlager". Consisting of Tommy Körberg, Claes Malmberg, Johan Rabaeus and Mats Ronander, it ended up 10th.

The group also appeared at Allsång på Skansen on 6 August 2013.
