= Eric Gadd =

Swedish singer and songwriter (born 1965)

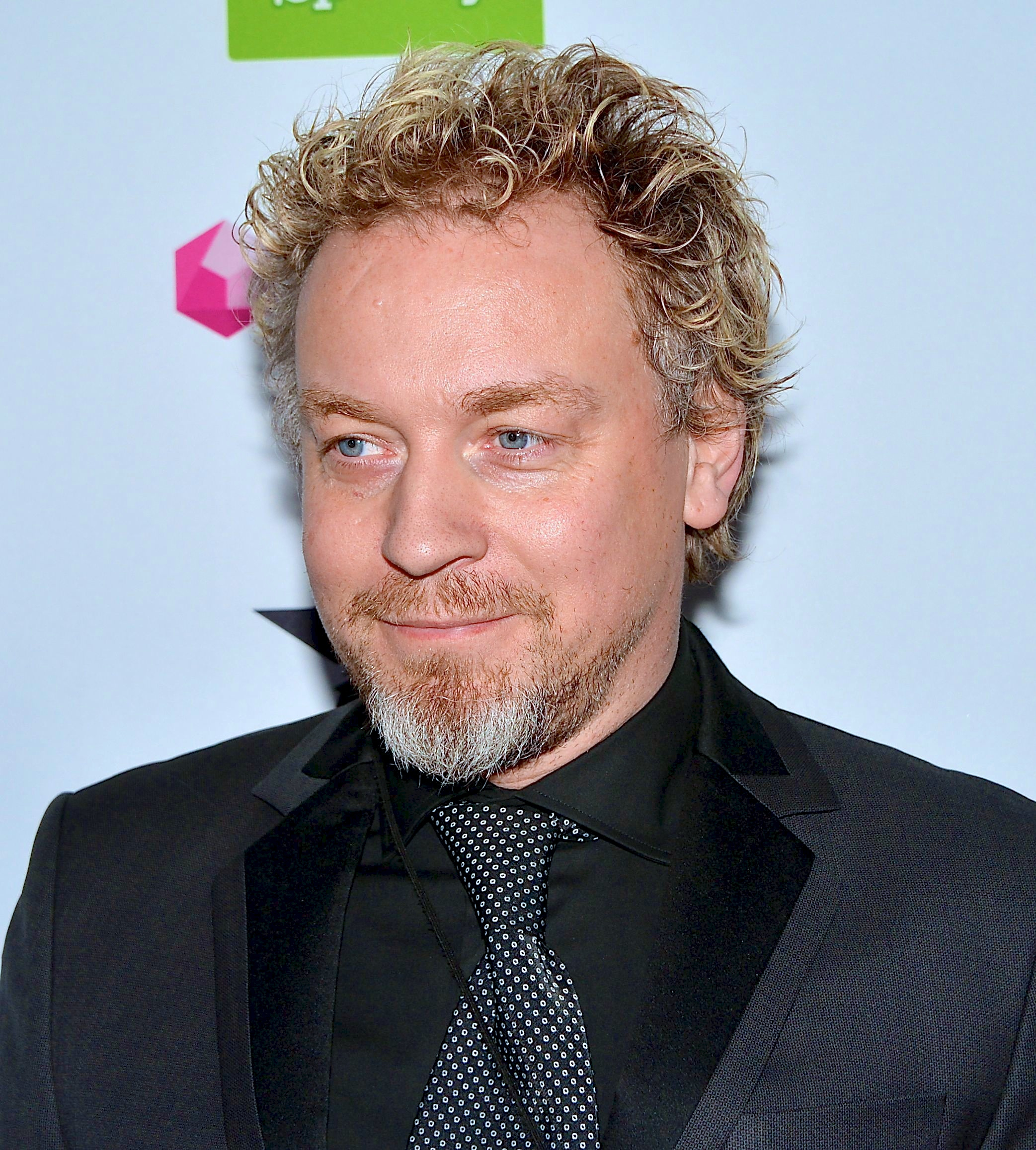
- Eric Gadd in 2013

Background information
- Born: Carl Erik Gudmund Sojdelius; 31 July 1965 (age 60)
- Origin: Uppsala, Sweden
- Occupation: Singer
- Website: Official website

Carl Erik Gudmund Sojdelius (born 31 July 1965), known as Eric Gadd, is a Swedish singer and songwriter. He has released thirteen music albums since his debut in 1987 and has also participated in Melodifestivalen.

== Career ==
Gadd was born in Uppsala, but grew up first in Visby, then, from the age of nine onwards, in Vallentuna. Gadd released his debut album Hello in 1987 with the single "Ett ensamt hjärta". Two years later, he released his second album Hurra du lever – Pang du är död, an album influenced by the music of the American singer Prince. In 1991, he released his third album Do You Believe in Gadd?; the single "Do You Believe in Me" was a dance hit in the Philippines. He then released a few more English-language albums including the collaboration with soul singers Caron Wheeler and Biti Strauchn on 'Floating' (1995) and 'The Right Way' (1997) before turning back to Swedish with his 2008 album Stockholm står kvar men jag ligger.

He was awarded a Swedish Grammis award as "Artist of the Year" in the years 1991, 1993 and 1997. Gadd participated in the first semi-final of Melodifestivalen 2013 on 2 February 2013 with the song "Vi kommer aldrig att förlora". The song was written by Gadd himself, Thomas Stenström and Jacob Olofsson. The song made it to the Second Chance round of the competition but failed to make it to the final. In 2018, he appeared on Så mycket bättre, broadcast on TV4.

== Personal life ==
Eric Gadd is married to singer Cornelia Sojdelius (née Åkerman).

== Discography ==
=== Albums ===
- 1987 – Hello
- 1989 – Hurra, du lever! Pang, du är död!
- 1991 – Do you Believe in Gadd?
- 1993 – On Display
- 1995 – Floating
- 1997 – The Right Way
- 1998 – Greatest Hits
- 1999 – Spirit
- 2002 – Life Support
- 2006 – Eric Gadd
- 2008 – Stockholm står kvar men jag ligger
- 2010 – Rise Up!
- 2013 – Fiende Eller Vän
- 2018 – Så Mycket Bättre

=== Singles ===
- 1987 – "Ett ensamt hjärta"
- 1989 – "Kom Hit Och Ta"
- 1989 – "Bara Himlen Ser På"
- 1989 – "Plus Minus"
- 1989 – "Din Man"
- 1990 – "Jag Säljer Mig"
- 1991 – "Do You Believe in Me"
- 1991 – "Excuse Me, Hallelujah"
- 1991 – "Deadstone"
- 1991 – "Power of Music"
- 1993 – "Wish I"
- 1993 – "Heaven Is Asleep"
- 1993 – "God Gave Me You"
- 1995 – "Why Don't You Why Don't I"
- 1995 – "There's No One Like You"
- 1995 – "What Once Was"
- 1997 – "The Right Way"
- 1997 – "My Personality"
- 1997 – "Summer Is Here"
- 1998 – "Everybody's Business"
- 1998 – "I Found Someone"
- 1998 – "Saint in the Parish"
- 1998 – "On My Way"
- 1998 – "Someone Who Cares"
- 1999 – "Riding High"
- 1999 – "Eye of the Spirit"
- 2000 – "One Touch"
- 2002 – "Hold On"
- 2003 – "Stay This Way"
- 2006 – "Meet Me Here"
- 2008 – "Tvåhundratusen"
- 2010 – "Rise Up!"
- 2013 – "Vi kommer aldrig att förlora!"

=== Charting singles ===
Title	Year	Peak chart positions	Album
Title	Year	SWE	Album
"Do You Believe in Me"	2013	7	
