= Rebound! =

Swedish boyband pop duo

- Origin: Sweden
- Genres: Pop, R&B
- Years active: 2010 – April 2011
- Labels: Sony Music
- Past members: Rabih Jaber; Eddie Razaz
- Website: Official Site

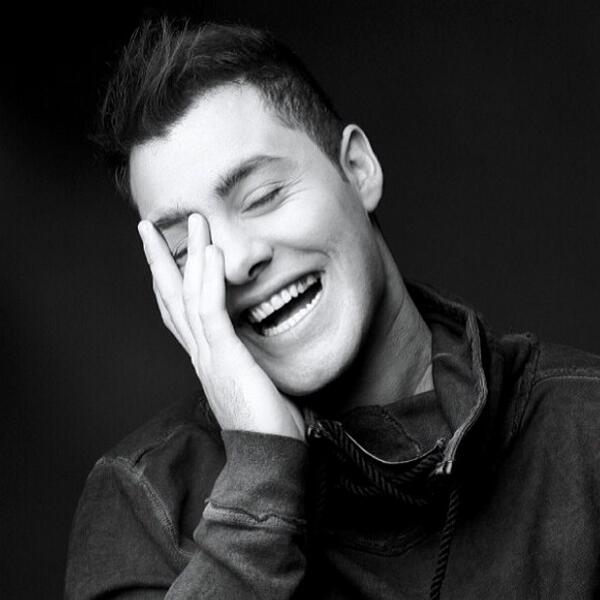
Rabih Jaber

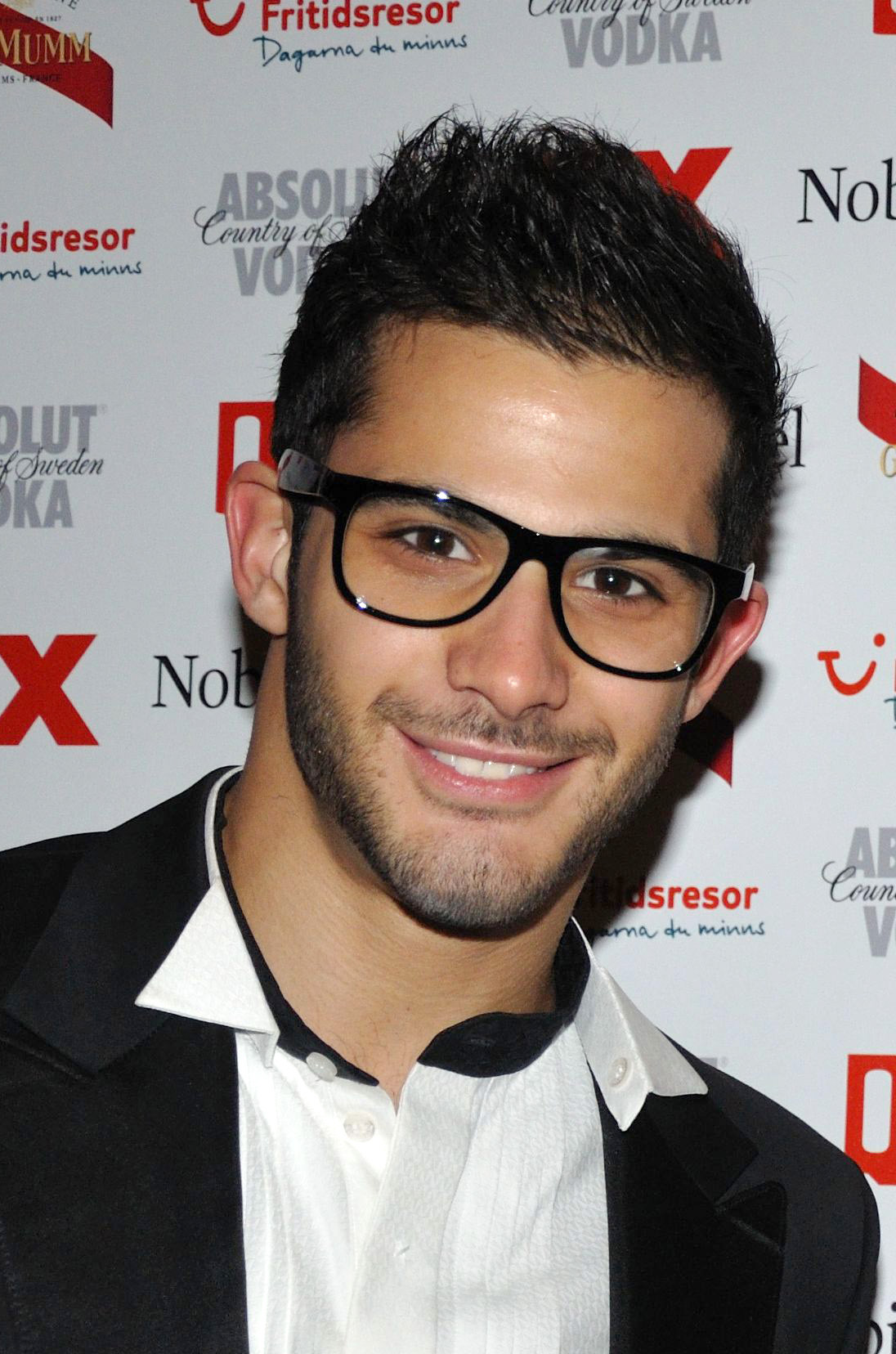
Eddie Razaz

Rebound! was a Swedish boyband pop duo established in 2010. Rebound! (written many times as REbound!) was made up of Rabih Jaber and Eddie Razaz, two contestants in Swedish Idol. The band was dissolved in April 2011 after three hits, including a #1 hit "Hurricane". After the split-up, the members continued pursuing solo singing careers.

== Career ==
The duo was formed in the beginning of 2010 and included the Swedish singer of Lebanese origin Rabih Jaber and Swedish singer of Persian origin Eddie Razaz. They adopted the stylized form REbound! with Capital R standing for Rabih and capital E standing for Eddie

They released their debut single named "Hurricane" on 12 April 2010. It reached #1 on the Swedish Singles Chart for 7 May 2010.

The follow-up singles were "Not Helpless" and "Psycho". Their debut album was to follow in 2011, but it never materialized. The duo announced the split-up of the group in two posts on the official website of the group on 30 April and 1 May 2011. They both declared that they were pursuing solo careers.

== Members ==
Both members of REbound! are former participants of Swedish Idol 2009 where they met.

Rabih Jaber (in Arabic ربيع جابر) (full name Rabih Mahmoud Jaber) was born on 5 August 1987 in Lebanon. His family immigrated to Sweden when he was 2 years old and resided in Lycksele. He was a striker in a Swedish soccer team playing in the Swedish Division III. He took part in TV4 Idol 2009. He survived until Week 5 when he was eliminated finishing seventh overall. His live performance of Michael Jackson's" You Are Not Alone" during Idol 2009 became a hit that stayed one week in the Swedish Singles Chart of 23 October 2009 at #44

Eddie Razaz (full name Ardalan Razaz Rahmati) is a Swedish singer of Persian origin born in Stockholm on 21 December 1988. He first auditioned for Swedish Idol in 2005 but was eliminated during the qualifying rounds. He also worked with a modeling agency. During Idol 2009, he was more successful, as he survived until Week 6 before being eliminated and finishing sixth overall. In the May 2010 issue of the Swedish gay magazine QX, Eddie Razaz came out as gay. He is also pursuing a modelling career. He modeled for Tom Ford Eyewear with photography by Bingo Rimér.

== After split-up ==
After the split-up, each of the two members has decided to continue in a solo career.

Rabih Jaber cooperated with producer Raaban in "Grenade", a cover of a Bruno Mars. The release was credited to Raaban feat. Rabih. Jaber is releasing his solo single "Millionaire" in summer 2011. In 2011, he also released the charity single "Leave the World Behind" with proceeds going to Karen Gebraeb Memorial Fund, after she was brutally murdered on 3 October 2011, while serving as a prison officer. The established fund helps young people recover from exclusion.

Eddie Razaz, signed with Warner Music Sweden. is preparing his debut solo album. He is cooperating in this regard with Kurdish-Persian-Swedish rapper and producer Rebstar. He is also taking part in Melodifestivalen 2013 with the song "Alibi".

== Discography ==
(For releases by duo members Rabih Jaber and Eddie Razaz after split-up, refer to their individual pages.)

=== Singles ===
Year	Album	Peak positions	Certification
Year	Album	SWE	Certification
2010	"Hurricane"	1	
2010	"Not Helpless"	–	
2011	"Psycho"	–	

Others

- 2010: "Not Helpless (Rink's If Only You Knew Remix)"
