= The Associate (soundtrack) =

Soundtrack album by various artists
- Released: October 15, 1996
- Recorded: April 1996–September 1996
- Length: 53:15
- Label: Motown
- Producer: Cassandra Mills; Christopher Tyng; Daryl Simmons; Donald Lawrence; Narada Michael Walden; Chris "Tricky" Stewart; Sean K.Hall; DJ Clark Kent; Vassal Benford; Steve Russell; Clifton "Specialist" Dillon; James Brown; Steve Lindsey; Leif Larson; Erik "E Smooth" Hicks

Compact disc

Professional ratings
Review scores
Source	Rating
Allmusic	2/5 stars

The Associate is the original motion picture soundtrack of the 1996 film The Associate, starring Whoopi Goldberg.

The soundtrack features actress and rapper Queen Latifah, Sophie B. Hawkins, American country singer Wynonna Judd, Canadian-American recording artist Tamia, CeCe Peniston, Kate Pierson and Cindy Wilson (both of The B-52s), Jamaican reggae singer Patra and Swedish musician Louise Hoffsten.

The cover version of "Yes We Can Can", originally released by the American R&B girl group The Pointer Sisters as their first hit single (No.#11 on the US Hot 100) in 1973, was re-recorded for the soundtrack by Taral Hicks, Chantay Savage, LaShanda Reese and the Pointer Sisters themselves. Kate Pierson along with Cindy Wilson contributed with the new version of the McFadden & Whitehead's disco track "Ain't No Stoppin' Us Now" (No.#1 in the US R&B, at #5 in UK Top 75 in 1979). From the classics, James Brown's composition "It's a Man's Man's Man's World" (No.#1 on the US R&B in 1966), and Elton John's gospel ballad "The Border Song" (No.#92 in the US Hot 100 in 1970 were also present.

== Track listing ==
No.	Title	Writer(s)	Performer(s)	Length
1.	"All That I Need"	Christopher Tyng, Taylor Tyng	CeCe Peniston	4:06
2.	"Makin' My Way (Any Way That I Can)"	Diane Warren	Wynonna Judd	5:23
3.	"The Border Song"	Bernie Taupin, Elton John	Sophie B. Hawkins	3:53
4.	"Keep Hope Alive"	Narada Michael Walden, Sally Jo Dakota	Tamia	4:42
5.	"Eventually"	Christopher A.Stewart, Sean K.Hall, London D.Jones	Shades (group)	4:49
6.	"Mr. Big Stuff"	J.Broussard, R.Williams, C.Washington, Queen Latifah, Free, DJ Clark Kent	Queen Latifah, Shades and Free	4:13
7.	"Yes We Can Can"	Allen Toussaint	Taral Hicks, Chantay Savage, LaShanda Reese and The Pointer Sisters	3:37
8.	"Are You Ready for Me"	Dorothy Smith, Pebbles, Arthur Hoyle, Debra Killings, Alexander Richbourg, Jason Sylvain, Mario Winans, Clifton Dillon, & Roy Jobe	Patra	4:32
9.	"The Turning Point"	Narada Michael Walden, Erik Hicks	LaShanda Reese	5:25
10.	"It's a Man's Man's Man's World"	James Brown and Betty Jean Newsome	James Brown	2:46
11.	"Ain't No Stoppin' Us Now"	Jerry Cohen, McFadden & Whitehead	Kate Pierson and Cindy Wilson	5:45
12.	"Nice Doin' Business"	Louise Hoffsten	Louise Hoffsten	4:04
Total length:				53:15

Notes

- Mr. Big Stuff contains a sample of the self-titled song by Jean Knight.

"All That I Need" by CeCe Peniston

== Credits and personnel ==
- CeCe Peniston - lead vocal
- Wynonna Judd - lead vocal
- Sophie B. Hawkins - lead vocal
- Tamia Hill - lead vocal

- Shades - lead and back vocals
- Queen Latifah - lead vocal, additional lyrics
- Free - lead vocal, additional lyrics
- Taral Hicks - lead vocal
- Chantay Savage - lead vocal
- LaShanda Reese - lead vocal
- Anita Pointer - lead vocal
- The Pointer Sisters - back vocals
- Patra - lead vocal
- James Brown - lead vocal, writer, producer
- Kate Pierson - lead vocal
- Cindy Wilson - lead vocal
- Louise Hoffsten - lead vocal, writer, harmonica
- The Tri-City Singers - back vocals
- Tanya Smith - back vocal
- Shonda Howard - back vocal
- Vicki Mc Kisic - back vocal
- Timmy Maia - back vocal
- Sonja - back vocal
- Claytoven Richardson - back vocal
- Skyler Jett - back vocal
- Sandy Griffith - back vocal
- Nikita Germaine - back vocal
- Al Beretta - rap
- Christopher Tyng - writer, producer, synthesizer, drum programming
- Taylor Tyng - writer, guitar
- Diane Warren - writer
- Bernie Taupin - writer
- Elton John - writer
- Narada Michael Walden - writer, producer, background vocal arrangement, drums, paste cymbals
- Sally Jo Dakota - writer
- Christopher Stewart - writer, producer, keyboards, programming and sequencing
- Sean K.Hall - writer, producer, keyboards, programming and sequencing
- London D.Jones - writer, co-producer
- J.Broussard - writer
- R.Williams - writer
- C.Washington - writer
- DJ Clark Kent - producer, additional lyrics, drum and sample programming
- Allen Toussaint - writer
- Dorothy Smith - writer
- Clifton "Specialist" Dillon - writer, producer
- Roy Jobe - writer, all instruments (on "Are You Ready for Me?")
- Erik "E Smooth" Hicks - writer, co-producer, background vocal arrangement
- Betty Jean Newsome - writer
- Jerry Cohen - writer
- McFadden & Whitehead - writers
- Daryl Simmons - producer, keyboards, drums
- Donald Lawrence - producer, back vocal
- Vassal Benford - producer
- Steve Russell - producer, vocal arrangement
- Steve Lindsey - producer
- Leif Larson - producer, guitar, keyboards, programming
- Cedric Thompson - co-producer
- Jimi "The Sweet" Fischer - co-producer, keyboards, guitar and bass, drums programming
- David "Frazeman" Frazer - associate producer
- Ronnie Garrett - bass
- Tarus Mateen - bass
- Vance Taylor - acoustic piano
- Jeremy Haynes - drums
- Jamie Hoover - guitar
- Louis Biancaniello - keyboards, drums, bass, programming
- Ernie Hayes - piano
- Dud Bascomb - trumpet
- Waymond Reed - trumpet
- Lamarr Wright - trumpet
- Haywood Henry - saxophone
- Billy Butler - guitar
- Bernard "Pretty" Purdie - drums
- Sammy Lowe - arranger, conductor
- John Robinson - drums
- Freddy Washington - bass
- Aaron Zigman - keyboards
- Dean Parks - guitar
- Waddy Wachtel - guitar
- Staffan Astner - guitar
- Nicci Wallin - drums, percussion
- Leonard Ostlund - percussion
- Eric Anest - programming
- James Bunton - project coordinator
- Marla Winston - production coordinator
- Lorenzo "Cornbread" Tranberg - production assistant
- Janice Lee - production coordinator
- Cherise Miller - production coordinator
- Cynthia Shiloh - production coordinator
- Kulan Kevin Walden - production coordinator

== See also ==
- List of artists who reached number one on the US Dance chart
