= I Don't Know How to Dance =

Studio album by Oscar Zia
- Released: 26 March 2014
- Genre: Pop; Europop
- Label: Warner Music

Oscar Zia chronology
I Don't Know How to Dance (2014)	Din (2018)

Singles from I Don't Know How to Dance
- 1. "#Fail" Released: 21 June 2013; 2. "Yes We Can" Released: January 2014; 3. "Ballare con me" Released: 2 July 2014

I Don't Know How to Dance is the debut studio album by Swedish singer Oscar Zia, released in Sweden on 26 March 2014 by Warner Music. It was preceded by the single "Yes We Can" which made it to the final of Melodifestivalen 2014. The album debuted at number three in Sweden in April.

== Background ==
Zia first come into media attention by auditioning for the inaugural X Factor (Swedish TV series) in 2012. Zia went on to finish 8th. In 2013, Zia was the runner up in Let's Dance 2013. His first single “#Fail” was released in June 2013. In 2014, Zia entered the Melodifestivalen 2014 with the song “Yes We Can” which came 8th in March 2014. Later that month, Zia released his debut studio album.

== Review ==
Sami Luukela of WiwiBloggs said “Overall, I Don’t Know How To Dance is a nice pop album, even if it doesn’t really bring anything new to the scene.” Also saying “The best track is a song called “Ballare Con Me”… it is a real summer anthem with a lot of bass.”

== Track listing ==
1. “Yes We Can” – 3:03
2. “Love On The Run” – 3:33
3. “Embers” – 3:34
4. “Ballare Con Me” – 3:12
5. “Without You” - 3:23
6. “Kiss (I Don't Know How To Dance)” – 3:10
7. “#Fail” – 3:23
8. “Breathe” – 3:39

== Charts ==
Chart (2014)	Peak position
Swedish Albums (Sverigetopplistan)	3

== Release history ==
Region	Date	Format	Label
Sweden	26 March 2014	CD, digital download	Warner Music Group
