= Kjell Jennstig =

Swedish musician and composer/songwriter (born 1960)

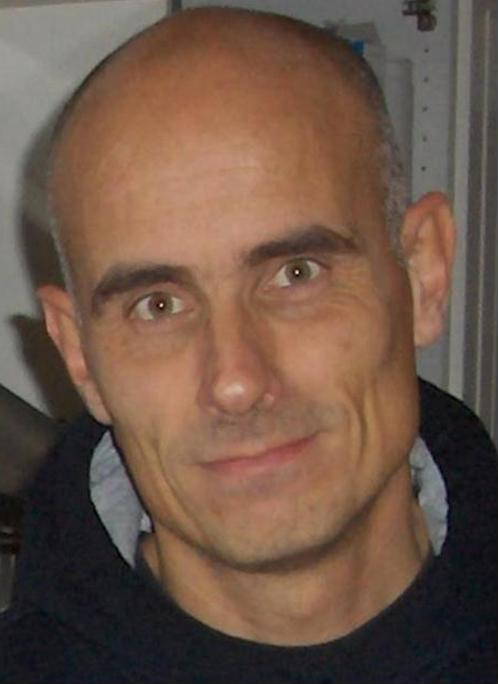
Kjell Jennstig

Kjell Jennstig (born February 17, 1960) is a Swedish musician and composer/songwriter. As a musician he is mostly known as guitarist in Swedish motorcycle group, Kenneth & the Knutters. As a composer/songwriter, he has written for a number of Swedish performers, including Carina Jaarnek, Caracola, Grönwalls, Blender and Caroline Wennergren.

Jennstig has participated three times in the Latvian Eurovision Song Contest preselection competition, Eirodziesma:

- In 2007, his song "Questa Notte", written together with Torbjörn Wassenius and Fransesca Russo and performed by Bonaparti.lv, won the competition. The song was then in the Eurovision Song Contest final in Helsinki where it ended 16th.
- In 2008, his song "You really got me going" ended second. It was written with Leif Goldkuhl and performed by "Aisha" (Aija Andrejeva).
- In 2011, Jennstig had two songs in the Spanish Eurovision Song Contest preselection (Destino Eurovision): "Evangeline" and "Golden Cadillac".

"Evangeline" qualified for the final where it was performed by "Auryn".

- In 2013, he had a song in the Swedish ESC preselection, Melodifestivalen. It won its semifinal and went to the final where it ended in tenth place .

The following table shows Kjells Eurovision entries so far:

Year	Country	Song	Performer	Result
2007	Latvia	Questa Notte	Bonaparti.lv	Winner of Latvian competition. 16th in European ESC final in Helsinki.
2008	Latvia	You Really got me going	Aisha	2nd the Latvian final
2008	Latvia	Fly to the moon	Janis Mojsejs	Out in semifinal.
2009	Latvia	Hey Hey Hey Hey	Aisha & G-Point	4th the Latvian final.
2010	Lithuania	Let it rain	Jurate Miliauskaite	10th in the Lithuanian final.
2011	Spain	Evangeline	Auryn	4th in the Destino Eurovision final.
2013	Sweden	En riktig jävla schlager	Ravaillacz	10th in the Melodifestivalen final.
