= TTELA =

Swedish daily newspaper

TTELA is a Swedish daily newspaper which covers the municipalities Trollhättan, Vänersborg, Lilla Edet and Mellerud in the provinces Västergötland and Dalsland in the Västra Götaland County, West Sweden.

The newspaper is owned by Stampen AB and is published six times a week, Monday to Saturday.

== History ==
The newspaper was formed in a merger between Trollhättans Tidning (TT) and Elfsborgs Läns Allehanda (ELA, Elfsborg is old spelling of Älvsborg) in 2004. ELA was the oldest of them, founded in 1885 as Elfsborgs Läns Annonsblad (in the 1980s renamed to Elfsborgs Läns Allehanda). It had readers mainly in Vänersborg and Mellerud. Trollhättans Tidning was founded 1906, having readers mainly in Trollhättan and Lilla Edet.

TTELA had the first issue of the new tabloid format on 4 December 2010.

== Saab Coverage ==
TTELA had a coverage of the Saab deal, starting with GM's decision to discontinue the factory in Trollhättan, as well as the whole brand Saab, and continuing up to date, with the broken Hawtai deal. Due to the tabloid centering on Trollhättan, where Saab is manufactured, and Vänersborg (location of the court), the newspaper has followed the story continuously, and grown famous in Saab circuits.
