= Alibi (podcast) =

South African true crime podcast

- Genre: Investigative
- Country of origin: South Africa
- Language: South African English

Creative team
- Created by: Paul McNally

Cast and voices
- Hosted by: Paul McNally and Freddy Mabitsela and Opoka p'Arop Otto

Production
- Production: John Bartmann; Kutlwano Serame
- Length: 30 Minutes

Publication
- No. of seasons: 3
- No. of episodes: 15
- Original release: February 2, 2017
- Provider: Develop Audio

Related
- Related shows: Serial (podcast)
- Website: www.developaudio.co.za

Alibi is a South African investigative podcast series created by Paul McNally and produced by Develop Audio. The first series is hosted by Freddy Mabitsela and McNally. The second series is hosted by just McNally. The third season is hosted by Opoka p'Arop Otto.

== Season 1 ==
The investigation started after Anthony de Vries sent a letter to the Wits Justice Project, a journalism investigative unit based in Johannesburg, South Africa. de Vries was incarcerated at the Boksburg Correctional Centre at the time of recording for seventeen years for double murder and robbery.

The first season has eight episodes. The first episode discusses the relationship between the police during South African apartheid and de Vries. The third episode of the season visits the scene of the crime in Vereeniging.

McNally cites Serial as an inspiration for the show. Anthony de Vries's story has been compared to Adnan Syed.

== Season 2 ==
The second season was launched in January 2020. There are six episodes. The second season covers the story of Priscilla Mchunu, a teacher from Laduma High School, who had been assassinated in 2017.

== Production ==
Other production credits include John Bartmann and Kutlwano Serame. The first season was syndicated on a national radio station. The creators of the show spoke at Africa Podfest in 2020.

Other podcasts related to Africa include African Tech Roundup, Sound Africa, Animation South Africa Podcast, and Property Woolf.

== Reception ==
The show received "Best Radio Feature" at the national Vodacom Journalist of The Year Awards. The show was featured in Toyota Connect Magazine as one of the "15 South African Podcasts You Need to Know About". The show had a 4.5 star rating on Apple Podcasts in March of 2020.

The show received criticism for turning a tragedy into entertainment.
