= Begging (song) =

Single by Anton Ewald

from the album A
- Released: February 22, 2013
- Genre: Pop
- Length: 3:01
- Label: Universal Music
- Songwriters: Fredrik Kempe; Anton Malmberg Hård af Segerstad
- Producers: Kempe; Segerstad

Anton Ewald singles chronology
"Begging" (2013)	"Can't Hold Back" (2013)

"Begging" is a 2013 song by Swedish singer Anton Ewald. The song was released on February 22, 2013, as the lead single from his debut extended play, A. Written by Fredrik Kempe and Anton Malmberg Hård af Segerstad, it was performed in Melodifestivalen 2013 in the second semi-final was held on 9 February 2013 in Scandinavium, Gothenburg. Finishing 3rd/4th, it went on to the Second Chance round, where it passed through to the Melodifestivalen final after a duel with Behrang Miri and his song "Jalla Dansa Sawa". In the finals, it finished at fourth place, failing to qualify to Eurovision Song Contest 2013.

Despite the result at the contest, the song gained popularity with the Swedish public and the single was released immediately after the competition. It subsequently peaked at number two on the Swedish Singles Chart.

== Charts ==
=== Weekly charts ===
Chart (2013)	Peak position
Sweden (Sverigetopplistan)	2
Turkish Singles Chart	87

=== Year-end charts ===
Chart (2013)	Position
Sweden (Sverigetopplistan)	22
