= Hurricane (Rebound! song) =

2010 Rebound! song

Single by Rebound!
- Released: 2010
- Recorded: 2010
- Genre: Electro-Pop
- Label: Sony Music
- Songwriters: Svante Halldin, Jakob Hazell and Teddy Sky
- Producers: Svante Halldin and Jakob Hazell

"Hurricane" is the English-language Swedish hit debut single by the Swedish boy band duo Rebound! made up of Rabih Jaber and Eddie Razaz. The song was written by Svante Halldin, Jakob Hazell and Teddy Sky and was produced by Svante Halldin and Jakob Hazell.

The electro-pop song "Hurricane" was released on 12 April 2010 and reached the top of the Swedish Singles Chart on the chart dated 7 May 2010.

== Charts ==
Chart (2010)	Peak position
Sweden (Sverigetopplistan)	1
