= Lamix =

Swedish rapper

Lamin Mbergan (born 1997) is a Swedish rapper of Gambian origin, better known by the mononym Lamix stylized as LAMIX and was also known as LMFamous. In 2018, he released his debut EP Ingen som hör which charted on Sverigetopplistan, the official Swedish Albums Chart. His hit song "Hey Baby" produced by Pablo Paz was his debut hit reaching number 21 on the Swedish Singles Chart and staying on the chart for an impressive 44 weeks.

Lamix was nominated for the Swedish Grammy for "Song of the Year" and also nominated for P3 Guld's "Artist of the Future" award. He has collaborated with a number of artists, most notably Jireel.

== Discography ==
=== Albums ===
| Title | Year | Peak positions |
| Title | Year | SWE |
|---|---|---|
| A.D.H.D | 2019 | 21 |

=== EPs ===
| Title | Year | Peak positions |
| Title | Year | SWE |
|---|---|---|
| Ingen som hör | 2018 | 19 |

=== Singles ===
==== As lead artist ====
| Title | Year | Peak positions | Album |
| Title | Year | SWE | Album |
|---|---|---|---|
| "Hey Baby" | 2017 | 21 | Ingen som hör |
| "Lamborghini" | 2017 | 74 | Non-album single |
| "Ankare" | 2018 | 23 | Ingen som hör |
| "Ingen som hör" | 2018 | 96 | Ingen som hör |
| "Main Squeeze" (featuring Jireel) | 2019 | 38 | Non-album single |
| "Designer" (with Ant Wan) | 2019 | 33 | A.D.H.D |
| "Piruett" (featuring Muwana) | 2019 | 51 | A.D.H.D |
| "Nu dom ser" (featuring Jireel) | 2019 | — (Note: "Nu dom ser" did not enter the Swedish Singellista Chart, but peaked at number four on the Swedish Heatseeker Chart.) | A.D.H.D |
| "Stora" (with Jireel) | 2020 | 57 | TBA |
| "Promille" (with Jireel) | 2021 | 83 | TBA |
| "Bästa vi gjort" (with Timbuktu) | 2022 | — (Note: "Bästa vi gjort" did not enter the Swedish Singellista Chart, but peaked at number four on the Swedish Heatseeker Chart.) | TBA |

==== As featured artist ====
| Title | Year | Peak positions | Album |
| Title | Year | SWE | Album |
|---|---|---|---|
| "Que Pasa" (stylized as "QUE PASA") (Omar Rudberg featuring LAMIX) | 2018 | | |
| "Woh" (Jireel featuring LAMIX) | 2018 | 62 | |
