= Melodifestivalen 2013 =

Swedish music competition

Dates and venues
- Heat 1: 2 February 2013
- Heat 2: 9 February 2013
- Heat 3: 16 February 2013
- Heat 4: 23 February 2013
- Second chance: 2 March 2013
- Final: 9 March 2013; Friends Arena, Solna

Production
- Broadcaster: Sveriges Television (SVT)
- Director: Daniel Jelinek; Mikael Olander
- Presenters: Gina Dirawi; Danny Saucedo

Participants
- Number of entries: 32: 8 in each heat; 10 in the final (2 from each heat, 2 from the Second Chance round)

Vote
- Voting system: 50% Jury, 50% SMS and telephone voting in the final. 100% SMS and telephone voting in the heats and Second Chance round.
- Winning song: "You" by Robin Stjernberg

Melodifestivalen 2013 was the Swedish music competition that selected the 53rd Swedish entry for the Eurovision Song Contest 2013. Robin Stjernberg's song "You" won the final, and became the first Second Chance song to win the Melodifestivalen final.

The final took place at the Friends Arena in Stockholm on 9 March 2013. For the twelfth consecutive year, the competition consisted of four heats, a "second chance" round, and a final. A total of 32 competing entries were divided into four heats, with eight compositions in each. From each heat, the songs that earned first and second place went directly to the final, while the songs that were placed third and fourth proceeded to the Second Chance heat. The bottom four songs in each heat were eliminated from the competition. This year the selection process for the 32 songs was slightly modified from the previous year by removing the web wildcard round and allowing the selection panel to decide on the finalist in the newcomer block of submissions. In addition, the winning artist of Svensktoppen nästa, a music competition organized by Sveriges Radio P4, automatically qualified to submit an entry for Melodifestivalen. Further changes included modification to the Second Chance round that removed one tier of duels.

== Format ==
Melodifestivalen 2013 was the twelfth consecutive year in which the competition took place in different cities across Sweden. The four heats were held in Karlskrona (2 February), Gothenburg (9 February), Skellefteå (16 February) and Malmö (23 February). The second chance round was held in Karlstad on 2 March while the final in Solna was held on 9 March. The final evening of the competition migrated to the newly built Friends Arena and for the first time since the creation of the current format, it did not take place at the Ericsson Globe.

In the heats, the winners were decided by the telephone and SMS votes of the viewers where the two entries with the most votes went directly to the final, while the third and fourth placed entries competed for another chance to get to the final in the Second Chance round. Of the eight songs that qualified to the Second Chance round, only two progressed to the final to complete the line-up of 10 finalists.

=== Schedule ===
Date	City	Venue	Capacity	Heat
2 February	Karlskrona	Telenor Arena	4,000	Heat 1
9 February	Gothenburg	Scandinavium	14,000	Heat 2
16 February	Skellefteå	Skellefteå Kraft Arena	6,000	Heat 3
23 February	Malmö	Malmö Arena	15,500	Heat 4
2 March	Karlstad	Löfbergs Lila Arena	10,600	Second chance (Andra chansen)
9 March	Solna	Friends Arena	27,000	Final

== Heats ==
The four heats were held in Karlskrona, Gothenburg, Skellefteå and Malmö. A selection panel consisting of seven men and eight women ages 17–46 selected the finalists out of 2549 total submissions (1902 for the regular contest and 647 for the newcomer selection).

In 2012, Sveriges Radio announced that they would award a wildcard to the artist that wins Svensktoppen nästa, a music competition organized by Sveriges Radio P4, the following year. While all of the artists competing in this competition already had songs, the competition was scheduled to take place on 26 August 2012, which was before the 1 September 2012 cut off date for both Melodifestivalen and the Eurovision Song Contest. Therefore, the winning artist was required to submit a new song that would then be given a wildcard to compete in the competition. Terese Fredenwall ultimately won the competition and on 19 October, SVT announced that she would compete in Melodifestivalen with the song "Breaking the Silence".

For Melodifestivalen 2013, SVT decided to discontinue the Web Wildcard competition that was previously held between 2010 and 2012. Instead, an open selection was still held for unpublished and new artists to submit their entries, however, the selection panel that evaluates submissions for the regular contest would also evaluate these entries and select one which would receive a wildcard. On 17 October 2012, SVT announced that the song "Island" performed by Elin Petersson had been selected and would receive the wildcard.

On 19 November 2012, the first of two press conference was held to present the artists, songs, and composers for the competing entries in the first and second heats. Sandra Bjurman and Stefan Örn, two of the composers who wrote "Running Scared", the winning song of the Eurovision Song Contest 2011, were among the names.

On 26 November 2012, the second press conference was held to complete the line-up and present the remaining entries that would compete in the third and fourth heats. Peter Boström and Thomas G:son, the composers of "Euphoria", the winning song of the Eurovision Song Contest 2012, both had several songs among the 32 entries.

On 3 January 2013, SVT announced the running order for each heat.

=== Heat 1 ===
The first heat was held on 2 February 2013 in Telenor Arena, Karlskrona. "Skyline" performed by David Lindgren and "Heartbreak Hotel" performed by Yohio qualified to the final, while the songs "Burning Flags" performed by Cookies 'N' Beans and "Vi kommer aldrig att förlora" performed by Eric Gadd qualified to the second chance round.

R/O	Artist	Song (English translation)	Songwriter(s)	Votes			Place	Result
R/O	Artist	Song (English translation)	Songwriter(s)	Round 1	Round 2	Total	Place	Result
1	David Lindgren	"Skyline"	Fernando Fuentes, Henrik Nordenback, Christian Fast	37,392	28,724	66,116	2	Final
2	Cookies 'N' Beans	"Burning Flags"	Fredrik Kempe	16,246	14,193	30,439	3	Second Chance
3	Jay-Jay Johanson	"Paris"	Jay-Jay Johanson	5,526	—	5,526	8	Out
4	Mary N'diaye	"Gosa" (Cuddle)	Johan Åsgärde, Mattias Frändå, Mary N’diaye	12,997	10,439	23,436	5	Out
5	Eric Gadd	"Vi kommer aldrig att förlora" (We'll Never Lose)	Eric Gadd, Thomas Stenström (tm), Jacob Olofsson	12,881	14,047	26,928	4	Second Chance
6	Yohio	"Heartbreak Hotel"	Johan Fransson, Tobias Lundgren, Tim Larsson, Henrik Göranson, Yohio	76,905	78,211	155,116	1	Final
7	Anna Järvinen	"Porslin" (Porcelain)	Björn Olsson, Martin Elisson	8,689	—	8,689	7	Out
8	Michael Feiner & Caisa	"We're Still Kids"	Michael Feiner, Caisa Ahlroth	12,098	—	12,098	6	Out

=== Heat 2 ===
The second heat was held on 9 February 2013 in Scandinavium, Gothenburg. "Copacabanana" performed by Sean Banan and "Only the Dead Fish Follow the Stream" performed by Louise Hoffsten qualified to the final, while the songs "Begging" performed by Anton Ewald and "Hello Goodbye" performed by Erik Segerstedt and Tone Damli qualified to the second chance round.

R/O	Artist	Song (English translation)	Songwriter(s)	Votes			Place	Result
R/O	Artist	Song (English translation)	Songwriter(s)	Round 1	Round 2	Total	Place	Result
1	Anton Ewald	"Begging"	Fredrik Kempe, Anton Malmberg Hård af Segerstad	33,436	37,049	70,516	3	Second Chance
2	Felicia Olsson	"Make Me No 1"	Henrik Wikström, Ingela "Pling" Forsman, Amir Aly, Maria Haukaas Mittet	19,559	35,490	55,049	5	Out
3	Joacim Cans	"Annelie"	Joacim Cans	7,069	—	7,069	8	Out
4	Swedish House Wives	"On Top of the World"	Peter Boström, Thomas G:son	17,172	—	17,172	6	Out
5	Erik Segerstedt & Tone Damli	"Hello Goodbye"	Robin Fredriksson, Mattias Larsson, Måns Zelmerlöw	30,295	40,107	70,402	4	Second Chance
6	Louise Hoffsten	"Only the Dead Fish Follow the Stream"	Louise Hoffsten, Sandra Bjurman, Stefan Örn	33,074	50,947	84,021	2	Final
7	Rikard Wolff	"En förlorad sommar" (A Lost Summer)	Tomas Andersson Wij	7,785	—	7,785	7	Out
8	Sean Banan	"Copacabanana"	Ola Lindholm, Sean Samadi (Sean Banan), Hans Blomberg, Joakim Larsson	79,428	64,314	143,724	1	Final

=== Heat 3 ===
The third heat was held on 16 February 2013 in Skellefteå Kraft Arena, Skellefteå."Falling" performed by State of Drama and "En riktig jävla schlager" performed by Ravaillacz qualified to the final, while the songs "In and Out of Love" performed by Martin Rolinski and "Hon har inte" performed by Caroline af Ugglas qualified to the second chance round.

R/O	Artist	Song (English translation)	Songwriter(s)	Votes			Place	Result
R/O	Artist	Song (English translation)	Songwriter(s)	Round 1	Round 2	Total	Place	Result
1	Eddie Razaz	"Alibi"	Thomas G:son, Peter Boström	19,476	—	19,476	6	Out
2	Elin Petersson	"Island"	Elin Petersson	7,494	—	7,494	8	Out
3	Ravaillacz	"En riktig jävla schlager" (A Proper Damn Schlager)	Kjell Jennstig, Leif Goldkuhl, Henrik Dorsin	52,275	57,980	111,255	1	Final
4	Amanda Fondell	"Dumb"	Freja Blomberg, Fredrik Samsson	18,488	—	18,488	7	Out
5	Martin Rolinski	"In and Out of Love"	Thomas G:son, Andreas Rickstrand	29,246	41,780	71,026	3	Second Chance
6	Caroline af Ugglas	"Hon har inte" (She Hasn't)	Caroline af Ugglas, Heinz Liljedahl	29,450	29,114	58,594	4	Second Chance
7	State of Drama	"Falling"	Göran Werner, Sebastian Hallifax, Emil Gullhamn, James Hallifax	40,803	39,256	80,059	2	Final
8	Janet Leon	"Heartstrings"	Fredrik Kempe, Anton Malmberg Hård af Segerstad	22,348	27,903	50,251	5	Out

=== Heat 4 ===
The fourth heat was held on 23 February 2013 in Malmö Arena, Malmö."Tell the World I'm Here" performed by Ulrik Munther and "Bed on Fire" performed by Ralf Gyllenhammar qualified to the final, while the songs "You" performed by Robin Stjernberg and "Jalla Dansa Sawa" performed by Behrang Miri qualified to the second chance round.

R/O	Artist	Song (English translation)	Songwriter(s)	Votes			Place	Result
R/O	Artist	Song (English translation)	Songwriter(s)	Round 1	Round 2	Total	Place	Result
1	Army of Lovers	"Rockin’ the Ride"	Alexander Bard, Henrik Wikström, Per QX, Andreas Öhrn, Jean-Pierre Barda	16,687	—	16,867	6	Out
2	Lucia Piñera	"Must Be Love"	Peter Kvint, Jonas Myrin	9,219	—	9,219	8	Out
3	Robin Stjernberg	"You"	Robin Stjernberg, Linnea Deb, Joy Deb, Joakim Harestad Haukaas	34,562	43,204	77,766	3	Second Chance
4	Sylvia Vrethammar	"Trivialitet" (Triviality)	Thomas G:son, Calle Kindbom, Mats Tärnfors	13,609	—	13,609	7	Out
5	Ralf Gyllenhammar	"Bed on Fire"	Ralf Gyllenhammar, David Wilhelmsson	43,609	49,616	93,225	2	Final
6	Behrang Miri	"Jalla Dansa Sawa" (Come On And Dance)	Behrang Miri, Anderz Wrethov, Firas Razak Tuma, Tacfarinas Yamoun	31,761	38,459	70,220	4	Second Chance
7	Terese Fredenwall	"Breaking the Silence"	Terese Fredenwall (music and lyric), Simon Petrén (music)	25,163	32,329	57,492	5	Out
8	Ulrik Munther	"Tell the World I'm Here"	Thomas G:son, Peter Boström, Ulrik Munther	70,204	58,160	128,364	1	Final

== Second Chance ==
The Andra Chansen (Second Chance) round was held on 2 March in Löfbergs Lila Arena, Karlstad.

The format for the Second Chance round underwent changes from the tournament concept introduced in 2007. The first round where the eight songs are paired into duels was removed in favour of two basic rounds of voting where all eight songs will compete against each other. All eight songs were performed one after the other in a producer determined draw like the preceding heats. After the first voting round, the top five compositions advanced and the bottom three were eliminated. The second round of voting narrowed the field down to the top four, eliminating the song that achieved fifth place. After the top four have been determined, the song that received the most votes in the previous voting rounds and the song that came in fourth were paired in a duel. The songs that came second and third were paired in another duel. The winning songs of these two duels progressed to the final. "Begging" performed by Anton Ewald and "You" performed by Robin Stjernberg qualified to the final.

=== First Round ===
R/O	Artist	Song	Votes			Place	Result
R/O	Artist	Song	Round 1	Round 2	Total	Place	Result
1	Robin Stjernberg	"You"	58,025	35,535	93,560	2	Second Round
2	Eric Gadd	"Vi kommer aldrig att förlora"	14,164	—	14,164	8	Out
3	Caroline af Ugglas	"Hon har inte"	35,234	—	35,234	6	Out
4	Behrang Miri	"Jalla Dansa Sawa"	56,165	29,618	85,734	4	Second Round
5	Erik Segerstedt & Tone Damli	"Hello Goodbye"	42,425	28,098	70,523	5	Out
6	Anton Ewald	"Begging"	66,965	31,696	98,661	1	Second Round
7	Cookies 'N' Beans	"Burning Flags"	25,826	—	25,826	7	Out
8	Martin Rolinski	"In and Out of Love"	51,997	35,787	87,764	3	Second Round

=== Second Round ===
Duel	R/O	Artist	Song	Votes	Result
I	1	Behrang Miri	"Jalla Dansa Sawa"	82,896	Out
I	2	Anton Ewald	"Begging"	105,890	Final
II	1	Robin Stjernberg	"You"	98,105	Final
II	2	Martin Rolinski	"In and Out of Love"	95,930	Out

== Final ==
The final of Melodifestivalen 2013 took place on 9 March 2013 at the Friends Arena in Solna. The 10 songs that qualified for the finals had either achieved being the top two in their respective heat, or having qualified from the Second Chance round.

The winner was selected by a combination of public votes and 11 international jury groups. The public and the jury each had a total of 473 points to award. Each jury group awarded points as follows: 1, 2, 4, 6, 8, 10 and 12 points. The public vote was based on the percentage of votes each song had achieved. For example, if a song gained 10% of the public vote, then that entry would be awarded 10% of 473 points rounded to the nearest integer. In the event of a tie, the public vote would overrule the jury. Robin Stjernberg was the winner with the song "You" after gaining the most points overall from the jury groups and achieving the second highest number of votes from the viewers.

R/O	Artist	Song	Juries	Televote/SMS/App			Total	Place
R/O	Artist	Song	Juries	Votes	Percentage	Points	Total	Place
1	Ulrik Munther	"Tell the World I'm Here"	82	154,334	9.4%	44	126	3
2	David Lindgren	"Skyline"	57	42,896	2.6%	12	69	8
3	State of Drama	"Falling"	50	61,462	3.7%	18	68	9
4	Anton Ewald	"Begging"	49	206,131	12.5%	59	108	4
5	Louise Hoffsten	"Only the Dead Fish Follow the Stream"	36	171,202	10.4%	49	85	5
6	Ralf Gyllenhammar	"Bed on Fire"	33	140,398	8.5%	40	73	7
7	Ravaillacz	"En riktig jävla schlager"	8	110,736	6.7%	32	40	10
8	Sean Banan	"Copacabanana"	37	142,288	8.7%	41	78	6
9	Robin Stjernberg	"You"	91	259,101	15.8%	75	166	1
10	Yohio	"Heartbreak Hotel"	30	356,080	21.7%	103	133	2

Detailed International Jury Votes
R/O	Song	Cyprus	Spain	Italy	Iceland	Malta	Ukraine	Israel	France	United Kingdom	Croatia	Germany	Total
R/O	Song	Cyprus	Spain	Italy	Iceland	Malta	Ukraine	Israel	France	United Kingdom	Croatia	Germany	Total
1	"Tell the World I'm Here"	6	6	12	8	6	2		12	12	8	10	82
2	"Skyline"	4	4		2	12	6	8	8		1	12	57
3	"Falling"		10	4	4	2	8	10	1	6	4	1	50
4	"Begging"	8			10	10	1	2		4	10	4	49
5	"Only the Dead Fish Follow the Stream"	2	12	6				4	6			6	36
6	"Bed on Fire"			1	6		12	6		8			33
7	"En riktig jävla schlager"		2		1				2	1		2	8
8	"Copacabanana"	12		8		1			4	10	2		37
9	"You"	1	8	10	12	8	10	12	10		12	8	91
10	"Heartbreak Hotel"	10	1	2		4	4	1		2	6		30
International jury spokespersons
Cyprus – Klitos Klitou; Spain – Federico Llano-Sabugueiro; Italy – Nicola Caligiore; Iceland – Jónatan Gardarsson; Malta – Chiara Siracusa; Ukraine – Gina Dirawi; Israel – Alon Amir; France – Bruno Berberes; United Kingdom – Simon Proctor; Croatia – Aleksandar Kostadinov; Germany – Torsten Amarell

== Ratings ==
Show	Date	Viewers	Votes (Telephone/SMS)
Heat 1	2 February 2013	3,605,000	329,695
Heat 2	9 February 2013	3,705,000	458,516
Heat 3	16 February 2013	3,552,000	419,319
Heat 4	23 February 2013	3,556,000	469,106
Second Chance	2 March 2013	3,248,000	900,898
Final	9 March 2013	4,130,000	1,644,628
