= Johnny Test season 6 =

Johnny Test
- Season 6
- Digital purchase image
- Showrunner: Scott Fellows
- No. of episodes: 26 (52 segments)

Release
- Original network: Cartoon Network; Boomerang; Teletoon
- Original release: April 23, 2013 – December 25, 2014

Season chronology
- ← Previous; Season 5

The sixth and final season of the animated television series Johnny Test originally aired on Cartoon Network in the United States. The season was announced by Teletoon on June 12, 2012, consisting of 26 episodes, with two segments each. In the United States, the season premiered on Boomerang on April 2, 2013, and on Cartoon Network on April 23. In Canada, it began airing on September 4, 2013, on Teletoon. This season would feature the return of Ashleigh Ball, who departed after Season 4, as the voices of Mary Test and Sissy Blakely. According to the end credits, Warner Bros. still owns its trademark.

== Reception ==
=== Ratings ===
According to Nielsen Media Research, numerous episodes of the season ranked first among the network's targeted demographic of boys aged 2–11, 6–11 and 9–14: "Johnny's Super Massive Kart Wheelies 7" on June 4, 2013; "Dial J for Johnny" on January 14, 2014; and "Crash Test Johnny" on February 25, 2014. The 2013 premieres of "Johnny Vets Dukey" on May 7, "Johnny's Rough Around the Hedges" on July 9, and "Johnny in Charge" on November 6 all ranked first for boys aged 6–11 and 9–14, while the premiere of "Johnny Express" on February 18, 2014, only ranked first among boys aged 9–14.

=== Home media ===
The season was made available for digital download through the iTunes Store, with the first of a two-part volume consisting of 13 episodes released on September 4, 2013, but it was removed in 2021–2022. The season is available to stream on Netflix.

=== Accolades ===
Writer Ethan Banville was nominated for a WGC Screenwriting Award by the Writers Guild of Canada in 2014 for his episode "Stop in the Name of Johnny". The ceremony was hosted at the Telus Centre for Performance and Learning's Koerner Hall.

== Cast ==
- James Arnold Taylor as Johnny Test
- Trevor Devall as Dukey
- Ashleigh Ball as Mary Test
- Maryke Hendrikse as Susan Test

== Episodes ==
All of the episodes in this season are directed by John Lei.

No. overall	No. in season	Title	Written by	Storyboard by	Original release date	Show no.	Prod. code	US viewers (millions)
92	1	"Johnny on the Clock"	Nathan Knetchel	Dave Pemberton	April 23, 2013	092	601	1.60
92	1	"Johnny X-Factor"	Scott Fellows	Steve Whitehouse	April 30, 2013	092	601	1.06
Johnny realizes that summer is over, so he tries to extend his summer vacation with Susan and Mary's time-stopping watch. It then breaks, so they try to fix it. Johnny X battles Boy Drone X.
93	2	"Johnny Vets Dukey"	Keith Wagner	Paul Schibli	May 7, 2013	093	602	1.16 (Note: This episode ranked #1 with boys 6-11 and 9-14 in its premiere timeslot.)
93	2	"Johnny's #1 Fan"	Rick Groel	Kevin Currie	May 14, 2013	093	602	1.09
Johnny chases Dukey, who refuses to go to the vet. Johnny takes on Dark Vegan with help from a fan.
94	3	"How to Train Your Johnny"	Neal Dusedau	Kervin Faria	May 21, 2013	094	603	1.47
94	3	"Johnny and Clyde"	Nick Confalone	Dave Pemberton	May 28, 2013	094	603	1.39
Susan and Mary accidentally erase all of Johnny's memories when trying to help him forget the dreaded Cleaning Song. Now they have to restore Johnny's memory in time for Dad's Cleaning Day feast. Susan and Mary's orangutan becomes a crook after watching old movies with Johnny.
95	4	"Johnny's Super Massive Kart Wheelies 7"	Mark Fellows	Katie Shanahan	June 4, 2013	095	604	1.53 (Note: This episode ranked #1 with boys 2-11, 6-11, and 9-14 in its premiere time slot, some of Cartoon Network's target demographics.)
95	4	"Smooth Talkin' Johnny"	Marcy Brown & Dennis Haley	Dmitri Kostic	June 11, 2013	095	604	1.57
Johnny, Dukey, Susan, Mary, Gil, The General, Mr. Black, Mr. White, Bling-Bling, Mr. Mittens, and Albert race video game go-carts to see who wins. Johnny swipes the girls' voice-replicating invention and ends up turning them against each other.
96	5	"Johnny and the Beanstalk"	Dan Serafin	Greg Hill	June 18, 2013	096	605	1.27
96	5	"Johnny and Bling Bling Bond Bond"	Keith Wagner	Steve Whitehouse	June 25, 2013	096	605	1.15
A giant cereal-stalk takes Johnny, Dukey and the girls on a magical adventure. Johnny tries to teach a grounded Bling-Bling how to be a regular kid after Bling-Bling's mom wanted him to learn about "the value of a dollar" by taking away all of his money for a week following an accident. Johnny later gets himself grounded by ruining Hugh's meatloaf by "mastering the art of clog dancing on meat."
97	6	"Johnny's Got Talent"	Story by : Brad Birch; Teleplay by : Sean Jara	Kevin Currie	July 2, 2013	097	606	1.47
97	6	"Johnny's Rough Around the Hedges"	Rick Groel	Kervin Faria	July 9, 2013	097	606	1.29
Johnny decides to take on ventriloquism for a talent contest. Johnny and Bling-Bling sculpt topiaries after their parents force them to take up less destructive hobbies.
98	7	"Johnny's Head in the Clouds"	Nathan Knetchel	Dave Pemberton	July 16, 2013	098	607	1.00
98	7	"Stop in the Name of Johnny"	Ethan Banville	Paul Schibli & Jun Nasayao	July 23, 2013	098	607	1.48
The General puts Johnny and his friends under house arrest right when an awesome air show heads into town. Johnny is late to class again, and he gets a visit to the principal's office which unexpectedly leads into Johnny becoming the new hall monitor of the school, due to someone named the Speedster (who is literally a speedster) delaying kids from getting to their classes. Johnny interrogates the school bully Bumper, who reveals the Speedster to be Sissy Blakely, so he "borrows" Susan and Mary inventions to try to catch Sissy.
99	8	"Johnny Opposite"	Marcy Brown & Dennis Haley	Joanne Rice & Paul Riley	July 30, 2013	099	608	0.99
99	8	"Johnny on the Job"	Story by : Neal Dusedau; Teleplay by : Dan Serafin	Katie Shanahan	August 13, 2013	099	608	1.31
Johnny steals Susan and Mary's generator and makes his family do the opposite of what they're doing. Johnny's dad thinks he's not needed in the house so he decides to get a job. When nobody hires him, Susan and Mary make a fake office for their dad to work in.
100	9	"Johnny's 100th Episode"	Scott Fellows	Steve Whitehouse	August 20, 2013	100	609	1.34
100	9	"Johnny's Next Episode"	Scott Fellows	Steve Whitehouse	August 27, 2013	100	609	1.22
The girls test their new fantasy spray on Johnny which sends him into a coma. The girls and Johnny's friends must revive him back into reality. Bling Bling Boy sprays fantasy spray on everyone (including himself) and they all turn into fairy tale characters.
101	10	"Johnny's Supreme Theme"	Derek Dressler	Kevin Currie	September 3, 2013	101	610	1.23
101	10	"Past and Present Johnny"	Story by : Neal Dusedau; Teleplay by : Dan Serafin	Kervin Faria	September 11, 2013	101	610	1.17
Real life becomes a movie after Johnny and Dukey get their hands and paws on the girls' latest invention. Johnny and Dukey visit the 1980s to get to the bottom of a video-game mystery.
102	11	"The Sands of Johnny"	Keith Wagner	Mo Sherwood	September 18, 2013	102	611	1.34
102	11	"Abominable Johnny"	Doug Lieblich	Dave Pemberton	September 25, 2013	102	611	1.29
Sissy and Johnny face off in a sandcastle battle. Johnny and Dukey locate the Abominable Snowman during a ski vacation.
103	12	"Johnny vs. The Dukenator"	Aaron Barnett	Steve Evangelatos	October 2, 2013	103	612	1.09
103	12	"Johnny's Petting Zoo Posse"	Sean Jara	Katie Shanahan	October 9, 2013	103	612	1.18
Johnny must rescue Dukey, who falls under the control of a dog-spa owner. Johnny and his friends take on Mr. Mittens when he turns them, the girls, the general and Black and White into petting zoo animals as part of his latest evil plan.
104	13	"The Johnny Who Saved Halloween"	Rick Groel	Greg Hill	October 16, 2013	104	613	1.16
104	13	"Johnny's Zombie Bomb"	Nick Confalone	Steve Whitehouse	October 23, 2013	104	613	1.45
Johnny and his friends enter a Halloween contest in hopes of winning a big candy prize. A love potion goes haywire and turns people into kissing zombies.
105	14	"Johnny's New Super Mega Villain"	Ethan Banville	Kevin Currie	October 30, 2013	105	614	0.98
105	14	"Johnny in Charge"	Sean Jara	Kervin Faria	November 6, 2013	105	614	1.13
Johnny must stop a new villain who arrives in Porkbelly, seeking to steal high-tech devices from everyone. Johnny is allowed to stay home alone and must prove he's responsible, but he ends up breaking three rules: He has friends over, dirties the kitchen, and goes into the lab and releases a cute yet deadly bug.
106	15	"Johnny Unplugged"	Mark Fellows	Mo Sherwood	November 13, 2013	106	615	1.20
106	15	"Johnny's Monster Mash"	Dan Serafin	Dave Pemberton	November 20, 2013	106	615	1.19
Johnny taps in his video-game skills to save the family during a perilous hiking trip. Monsters created by the girls' experiments take aim at Porkbelly.
107	16	"Johnny's Chipmunk Chit Chat"	Rick Groel	Steve Evangelatos	December 4, 2013	107	616	1.33
107	16	"A Picture's Worth 1000 Johnnies"	Keith Wagner	Katie Shanahan	January 8, 2014	107	616	1.22
Johnny borrows a new invention from the girls that lets him talk to animals. However, this accidentally encourages all the chipmunks in Porkbelly to take over the world. Chaos erupts at the mall when the Tests try to pose for a family portrait.
108	17	"Dial J for Johnny"	Derek Dressler	Greg Hill	January 14, 2014	108	617	1.49
108	17	"Road Trip Johnny"	Ethan Banville	Steve Whitehouse	January 21, 2014	108	617	1.63
Johnny and Dukey prank call historical figures using the girls' time machine, but they eventually get their revenge. The Test family goes on a road trip to Upchuck Geysers.
109	18	"Code Crackin' Johnny"	Keith Wagner	Kervin Faria	January 28, 2014	109	618	1.21
109	18	"Johnny Goes Viral"	Nick Confalone	Kevin Currie	February 4, 2014	109	618	1.29
Johnny and Dukey cheat their way to victory in the Red Gush contest. But Red Gush gets mad and sends the Red Gusher to kill Johnny. Johnny has access after the girls insert a computer chip into his brain that was meant for the general. The chip's infected with a virus, and when it's inserted onto the general, he presses a red button to launch a missile on Porkbelly.
110	19	"FrankenJohnny"	Keith Wagner	Dave Pemberton	February 11, 2014	110	619	1.32
110	19	"Johnny Express"	Ethan Banville	Mo Sherwood	February 18, 2014	110	619	1.36 (Note: This episode ranked #1 with boys aged 9-14 in its premiere time slot.)
Johnny and Bling-Bling fall apart after an accident with the particle accelerator. Johnny runs into trouble delivering a package for the girls.
111	20	"Crash Test Johnny"	Derek Dressler	Brian Wong	February 25, 2014	111	620	1.35
111	20	"Johnny's Junky Trunk"	Sean Jara	John Flagg	March 4, 2014	111	620	1.05
Johnny quits as the girls' test subject and quickly regrets his decision. Hugh donates Johnny's toys to charity – without asking Johnny! He tries to get them back.
112	21	"Super Johnny Action Federation"	Ethan Banville	Greg Hill	March 11, 2014	112	621	1.06
112	21	"Gil-Stopping Johnny"	Rick Groel	Steve Whitehouse	April 23, 2014	112	621	1.29
The gang acquire super powers and compete to see who is the best super hero. Johnny goes to extreme measures to prevent Gil from moving so Susan and Mary will continue their experiments. This fails but Gil moves the other next door.
113	22	"Johnny with a Chance of Meatloaf"	Keith Wagner	Kevin Currie	April 30, 2014	113	622	1.24
113	22	"It's Easter, Johnny Test!"	Dan Serafin	Kervin Faria	April 9, 2014	113	622	N/A
Johnny and his sisters make a vow to end Dad's meatloaf madness. Dad's gone meatloaf mad and the kids plot to put a stop to his meatloaf making. But when they unleash a giant Meatloaf Monster, they end up in the food fight of their lives. Johnny must save Easter from the annual Easter-egg hunt ruined by Dark Vegan.
114	23	"Future Johnny"	Derek Dressler	Mo Sherwood	May 14, 2014	114	623	N/A
114	23	"Dukey See, Johnny Do"	Story by : Sean Jara; Teleplay by : Derek Dressler	Dave Pemberton	December 25, 2014	114	623	N/A
Johnny meets his future self. "Dukey See, Johnny Do": Johnny temporarily loses his sight.
115	24	"Hair's Johnny"	Story by : Sean Jara; Teleplay by : Keith Wagner	Dan Nosella	December 25, 2014	115	624	N/A
115	24	"Johnny's Hungry Games"	Story by : Nathan Knetchel; Teleplay by : Josh Hamilton	Kervin Faria	December 25, 2014	115	624	N/A
Johnny is accidentally turned into a gassy werewolf. All of the pizza in Porkbelly goes missing.
116	25	"Tiny Johnny"	Dan Serafin	Greg Hill	December 25, 2014	116	625	N/A
116	25	"Johnny Goes Gaming"	Story by : Scott Fellows; Teleplay by : Derek Dressler	Kevin Currie	December 25, 2014	116	625	N/A
The girls shrink Johnny and Dukey in order to try and catch a mouse. Johnny and Dukey get trapped inside a virtual video game.
117	26	"The Last Flight of Johnny X"	Keith Wagner	Steve Whitehouse	December 25, 2014	117	626	N/A
117	26	"Johnny's Last Chapter"	Nathan Knetchel	Dave Pemberton	December 25, 2014	117	626	N/A
After Porkbelly is attacked by the 100th monster, The General bans all superhero activity. In the series finale of Johnny Test, Johnny and Dukey are sucked into a history book while learning about the history of Porkbelly.
