= Johnny Test season 5 =

Johnny Test
- Season 5
- Showrunner: Scott Fellows
- No. of episodes: 26 (52 segments)

Release
- Original network: Cartoon Network; Teletoon
- Original release: June 13, 2011 – August 15, 2012

Season chronology
- ← Previous; Season 4 Next → Season 6

The fifth season of the animated television series Johnny Test originally aired on Cartoon Network in the United States. The season was announced by Cookie Jar Entertainment on August 24, 2010, consisting of 26 episodes, with two segments each. In the United States, the season premiered on Cartoon Network on June 13, 2011. This would be the first season with Trevor Devall as the new voice of Dukey. Additionally, Brittney Wilson, who departed after Season 1, would return to voice Mary Test and Sissy Blakely, although Ball later returned to resume her roles in Season 6. According to the credits, Warner Bros. still owns its trademark.

== Cast ==
- James Arnold Taylor as Johnny Test
- Trevor Devall as Dukey
- Brittney Wilson as Mary Test
- Maryke Hendrikse as Susan Test

== Episodes ==
Like season 3, all of the episodes are directed by Larry Jacobs.

No. overall	No. in season	Title	Written by	Storyboard by	Original release date	Show no.	Prod. code	Viewers (millions)
66	1	"Johnny Goes Nuts"	Keith Wagner	Kervin Faria	June 13, 2011	066	501	1.48 (2-11) (Note: With kids aged 2-11. This episode also received: 1.04 million viewers with children aged 6-11; 0.68 million viewers with tweens aged 9-14)
66	1	"Johnny Daddy Day"	Scott Fellows	Lyndon Ruddy	June 13, 2011	066	501	1.48 (2-11)
Johnny is finally old enough to participate in Porkbelly's Annual Running of the Squirrels, but he has to get past Lila, who thinks it's too dangerous, and duct-tapes Johnny to a chair. Johnny, the twins and Lila realize it's Father's Day, and they don't have a gift. They try many disastrous attempts, making Hugh wish they had never remembered! Note: This is the first episode with Trevor Devall as Dukey. Following Louis Chirillo (the original voice of the character)'s marriage with a woman from Brazil and Canada only allowing two national citizenships, he gave up his Canadian one, effectively banning him from working on the series.
67	2	"Johnny Cruise"	Mark Fellows	Kevin Currie	June 20, 2011	067	502	N/A
67	2	"Rated J for Johnny"	Scott Fellows	Steve Whitehouse	June 20, 2011	067	502	N/A
Johnny wins an ocean cruise for him and his family, but it turns to be just a trap by Bling-Bling Boy, who deliberately crashes the ship so he can romantically save Susan. Johnny tries various schemes to buy Toxic Battle Blast Four, not knowing what the consequences will be.
68	3	"Spotless Johnny"	Brad Birch	David Thomas	June 27, 2011	068	503	N/A
68	3	"Johnny vs. Bling-Bling: The Ultimate Battle"	Scott Fellows	Jeff Barker	June 27, 2011	068	503	N/A
After Johnny and Dukey track mud in the house, they use a special stain-remover designed by Susan and Mary, but also learn it can make Johnny invisible. Tired of all of the Johnny vs. Bling-Bling battles with no winner, the Test sisters and Bling-Bling's science team make a bet to see who is the final winner of the battles.
69	4	"Cat Scratch Johnny"	Keith Wagner	Dave Pemberton	July 11, 2011	069	504	N/A
69	4	"Johnny of the Deep"	Rick Groel	Gerry Fournier	July 11, 2011	069	504	N/A
Susan & Mary invent 3.5D glasses. Johnny and Dukey use them, but when they put them over 3D glasses, they bring characters in a science-fiction movie to life and now the aliens in the movie want to conquer the Earth. Mary turns Johnny and Dukey into sharks to prevent Bling-Bling Boy from reacquiring a ring capable of hypnotizing Susan into falling in love with him that he lost in the ocean.
70	5	"Johnny Swellville"	Brad Birch	Kervin Faria	July 18, 2011	070	505	N/A (Note: This episode saw ratings increase with kids 6-11 by 21%, and tweens 9-14 by 44%.)
70	5	"Johnny Irresistible"	Mark Fellows	Greg Hill	July 18, 2011	070	505	N/A
A time-traveling mishap sends Johnny and Dukey back to the 1950s. Johnny wants to increase his charisma when he becomes jealous of Gil's popularity.
71	6	"Black & White & Johnny All Over"	Lazar Saric	Lyndon Ruddy	July 25, 2011	071B	506B	N/A
71	6	"Johnny's Rat Race"	Bobby Gaylor	Kevin Currie	July 25, 2011	071A	506A	N/A
Johnny and Dukey help Mr. Black and Mr. White catch a runaway robot dog before it explodes. Johnny uses his sisters' genetically altered rat for a school project, only to have it stolen by a desperate circus owner to save his failing show.
72	7	"Lawn Gone Johnny"	Martin Olson	David Thomas	August 1, 2011	072	507	N/A (Note: This episode ranked #1 in all key boy demos for its time slot, and earned double and triple digit gains among kids and boys during its premiere.)
72	7	"Johnny's Ultimate Treehouse"	Mike Yank	Dave Pemberton	August 1, 2011	072	507	N/A
Johnny, his friends, and his enemies compete with each other in a lawn mower race. Johnny "borrows" his sisters' worker drones to build the ultimate treehouse to impress Sissy, but ultimately ends up failing.
73	8	"Johnny Goes Camping"	Bobby Gaylor	Greg Hill	August 8, 2011	073	508	1.96 (Note: This episode ranked #1 in all key boy demos for its time slot.)
73	8	"Johnny's World Prank Wars 1"	Scott Fellows	Kervin Faria	August 15, 2011	073	508	N/A
When Johnny is ordered by his school to go camping with his father, he uses his sisters' ray gun to turn Dukey into a monster to scare his father out of it, only to have a female Bigfoot fall in love with monster Dukey. Johnny competes with his family, his friends, and his enemies in a prank war.
74	9	"How to Become a John-i Knight"	Keith Wagner	Lyndon Ruddy	August 22, 2011	074	509	1.59
74	9	"The Return of Johnny Super Smarty Pants"	Josh Hamilton	Gerry Fournier	August 29, 2011	074	509	1.53
Aliens from a meat-themed planet ask Johnny to protect their home world from Dark Vegan who wants to destroy it out of frustration because of his failure to make the perfect toast. The Super Smarty Pants possesses an Eskimo to get to Johnny, where it kicks him away and possesses Johnny, making him the smartest kid in school. To make him even smarter, Smarty Shirt is invented. Not wanting to be outsmarted, his sisters go to great lengths to "de-pants" him.
75	10	"Fangs a Lot Johnny"	Mark Drop	Steve Whitehouse	October 10, 2011	075	510	1.75
75	10	"Johnny Testosterone"	Scott Fellows	Jeff Barker	September 5, 2011	075	510	N/A
Johnny accidentally turns his sisters into vampiresses, and has to save Gil from getting bitten by his lovestruck vampiress sisters and cure them. Johnny wants to become bigger and eats all of the peach yogurt, knowing that each container is filled with growth serum, not knowing that he will lose control and his mind become a Hulk-like monster, causing destruction and even getting himself killed.
76	11	"Johnny's Keys to Success"	Rick Groel	Kevin Currie	September 19, 2011	076	511	N/A
76	11	"Johnny's Winter Jacket"	Scott Fellows	Dave Pemberton	September 26, 2011	076	511	N/A
Susan and Mary make a key for Johnny that can open any lock in Porkbelly, but people try to steal it for their own benefits. When Johnny's mom makes him wear a big winter coat, he is teased at school. However, Mr. Black, Mr. White, and the General ask Susan and Mary to make some sort of weapon to destroy aliens if they ever attacked, so they make Johnny's jacket the weapon.
77	12	"Johnny Two-Face"	John Derevlany	Steve Whitehouse	October 3, 2011	077	512	1.46
77	12	"Johnny Susan, Susan Johnny"	Rick Groel	David Thomas	November 7, 2011	077	512	N/A (Note: This episode ranked #1 with boys 9-14 for its timeslot.)
Tired of Johnny's constant lying, Susan and Mary try to make him tell the truth, but attach a second mouth to him that does nothing but tell the truth. Susan swaps bodies with Johnny so that she and Mary can get a men-only science award. Then Eugene kidnaps Susan Johnny, straps his/her arm to the table, and duct tapes his/her mouth.
78	13	"Johnny Trick or Treat"	Bobby Gaylor	Kervin Faria	October 17, 2011	078	513	1.61 (Note: This episode was ranked #1 for boys 6-14 and kids 9-14 during its timeslot.)
78	13	"Nightmare on Johnny's Street"	Bobby Gaylor	Lyndon Ruddy	October 24, 2011	078	513	1.49
Johnny spends the night in a haunted house with Dukey and Jillian to win a ton of candy. Johnny stays up half the night to watch a six-hour Halloween monster-movie marathon, then steals his sisters' dream machine (thinking it is an alarm clock) so that he will be able to wake up in time for school the next day; however, he has nightmares during the night which the device brings to life monsters that kidnap Gil.
79	14	"My Dinner with Johnny"	Mark Fellows	Greg Hill	November 14, 2011	079	514	1.90
79	14	"Johnny Alternative"	Brad Birch	Jeff Barker	November 21, 2011	079	514	1.38
Tired of Johnny's repulsive eating habits, Hugh challenges him to a bet to see if he can go one full meal without complaining about his food or making rude noises. He tries help from his sisters, but they refuse to avoid the risk of indefinite grounding. When Johnny and Dukey get tired of the same old Porkbelly, they ask the girls to make it seem more fun. But they accidentally get sent to an alternate universe where they find that everyone (including themselves) is the opposite gender.
80	15	"Cool Hand Johnny"	Denise Downer	Steve Whitehouse	November 28, 2011	080	515	N/A
80	15	"Roller Johnny"	Jenny Keene	John Flagg	January 11, 2012	080	515	N/A
Johnny and Dukey have to escape from a video game when the duo are imprisoned in it by Wacko. Susan and Mary turn Johnny and Dukey into girls so that they can win the grand prize at a roller derby match, but things quickly take a turn for the worse when a blow on the head gives Dukey amnesia, and he thinks that he's a derby queen.
81	16	"A Holly Johnny Christmas"	Scott Fellows	Dave Pemberton	December 5, 2011	081	516	N/A
81	16	"Johnny's First Annual Snowball"	Scott Fellows	Steve Whitehouse	December 12, 2011	081	516	N/A
The Tests try to get Johnny a new toy when it sells out in the local shopping mall. Johnny invites everyone to his house for a snowball fight, but forgets to put the word "fight" on the invitation, which misleads everyone into believing it's actually a "Snow Ball" dance.
82	17	"Lakeside Johnny"	Story by : Lazar Saric; Teleplay by : Keith Wagner	Dave Pemberton	January 18, 2012	082	517	1.62
82	17	"Johnny Germ Fighter"	Stephen Sustarsic	Kevin Currie	January 25, 2012	082	517	N/A
Johnny heads to Camp Oonawakawaka and battles in a boating competition against Camp Gottalotamomey. Johnny's dad gets fed up with his filthy bathroom and demands Johnny to clean it up but when Johnny uses his sisters' special germ foam and his dad's cleaning products, problems arise as it causes the germs to grow out of control.
83	18	"Johnny's World Record"	Merriwether Williams	Greg Hill	February 1, 2012	083	518	N/A
83	18	"Mush, Johnny, Mush"	Brad Birch	Kervin Faria	February 8, 2012	083	518	N/A
Johnny is determined to break a world record so he can get into the Frothy Book of Crazy, Insane & Useless Records. After failing 23 times, he gets in the book. Johnny, his friends, and his enemies take on a snooty rich boy in a dog sled race.
84	19	"Johnny's Treasure"	Josh Hamilton	Paul Brown	February 15, 2012	084	519	N/A
84	19	"Extra Credit Johnny"	Dean Stefan	Kevin Currie	February 22, 2012	084	519	N/A (Note: This episode ranked #1 in its timeslot with boys, receiving double and triple delivery gains versus the 2011 time period.)
Johnny, Dukey, and the girls set out to find the treasure of Pie-Eyed Pat when they find his treasure map in the attic. Johnny must do some extra credit for school, or he will fail the course and have to make it up in summer school.
85	20	"Johnny's Left Foot"	Mike Yank	Jeff Barker	March 7, 2012	085	520	N/A
85	20	"Johnny vs. The Tickler"	Johnny Derevlany	Greg Hill	March 14, 2012	085	520	N/A
When Johnny breaks his foot in a dangerous stunt, which Hugh and Lila ground him for, his sisters step up to create a robotic one for him. But the real foot comes to life. Angry at Johnny for having Whacko put in jail, his brother The Tickler decides it's time for him to stop Johnny once and for all, so he kidnaps Susan and Mary and overly tickles them over and over and over again, forcing Johnny to seek help in unexpected places.
86	21	"Bugged Out Johnny"	Mark Fellows	Kervin Faria	March 21, 2012	086	521	N/A
86	21	"Johnny Test's Quest"	Bobby Gaylor	Jeff Baker	March 28, 2012	086	521	N/A
Johnny and Dukey try to catch bugs, only to come upon a ladybug with a voracious appetite. Bling-Bling tries to get Susan once again, but his henchmen soon rebel against him by tying him up with Susan.
87	22	"Johnny O's"	Jenny Keene	Tom Nesbitt	April 4, 2012	087	522	N/A
87	22	"It's Du-Kay Johnny"	Denise Downer	Robin Budd	April 11, 2012	087	522	N/A
Sick of cheap cereal prizes that don't work, Johnny decides to make himself a new breakfast cereal. But everything goes haywire when Johnny decides to put in real ray guns made by his twin sisters, and the entire town of Porkbelly becomes a city of chaos and destruction of what anyone chooses to destroy. When Dukey's DNA begins to degrade, reverting him into a normal dog, the girls attempt to upgrade it, but their upgrade goes overboard, turning Dukey into a rich, snooty dog.
88	23	"Magic Johnny"	Josh Hamilton	Steve Whitehouse	June 6, 2012	088	523	N/A (Note: This episode ranked as the #1 telecast of the day among boys and the #1 telecast of the day among all boys 2-11 & 6-11, receiving double and triple delivery gains versus the 2011 time period.)
88	23	"Dolly Johnny"	Mike Yank	Dave Pemberton	June 13, 2012	088	523	N/A
Johnny tries to prove to Sissy that he can do magic so he gets his sisters to help him. When they take the vacation to Paris, he makes the Eiffel Tower disappear, which angers the French city. Johnny disagrees to help the girls test experiments so they create a special doll that can control Johnny, but Johnny seeks revenge and creates special dolls that can control the girls. They both get in trouble since Hugh's against DNA experiments.
89	24	"Johnny McCool"	Brad Birch	Kevin Currie	June 20, 2012	089	524	N/A
89	24	"It's an Invasion, Johnny"	Phil Ivanusic	Greg Hill	June 27, 2012	089	524	N/A
Johnny becomes Speed McCool's new stunt man. Black and White get into trouble in outer space and it's up to the kids to save them.
90	25	"It's All Relative, Johnny"	Rick Groel	Jeff Barker	July 25, 2012	090	525	N/A
90	25	"Johnny Rich"	Dave Beatty	Steve Whitehouse	August 1, 2012	090	525	N/A
Johnny and Dukey go back in time to meet Johnny's ancestor in order to write a report about him. The Tests become rich when they sell one of Susan and Mary's inventions, but Bling-Bling is jealous and goes to war with them.
91	26	"Johnny X... Again?"	Bobby Gaylor	Dave Pemberton	August 8, 2012	091	526	N/A
91	26	"Green Johnny"	Bobby Gaylor	Chad Hicks & Greg Hill	August 15, 2012	091	526	N/A
Johnny visits Repto-slicer and his family, but Repto-slicer then tries to eat Porkbelly. Johnny isn't green when it comes to Earth Day, so Hugh, the twins, and Lila try to solve this. They soon become ghosts in a parody of A Christmas Carol, with Hugh representing the past, twins representing the present, and Lila representing the future.
