= List of Johnny Test episodes =

The following is a list of episodes for the animated television series Johnny Test.

== Series overview ==
Season	Segments	Episodes	Originally released		
Season	Segments	Episodes	First released	Last released	Network
1	26	13	September 17, 2005	July 29, 2006	The WB (Kids' WB!) (U.S.)
2	26	13	October 28, 2006	May 12, 2007	The CW (Kids' WB!) (U.S.); Teletoon (Canada)
3	26	13	September 22, 2007	March 1, 2008	The CW (Kids' WB!) (U.S.); Teletoon (Canada)
4	52	26	November 9, 2009	September 12, 2011	Cartoon Network (U.S.); Teletoon (Canada)
5	52	26	June 13, 2011	August 15, 2012	Cartoon Network (U.S.); Teletoon (Canada)
6	52	26	April 23, 2013	December 25, 2014	Cartoon Network (U.S.); Teletoon (Canada)

== Episodes ==
=== Season 1 (2005–06) ===
All episodes in this season have been produced by Scott Fellows and Chris Savino and directed by Chris Savino.

No. overall	No. in season	Title	Written by	Storyboard by	Original release date	Show no.	Prod. code	K6−11 rating/share
1	1	"Johnny to the Center of the Earth"	Scott Fellows	Chris Savino & Joe Horne	September 17, 2005	001	257−961	3.0/14 (Note: This episode also received: A 2.2/10 rating with Girls 2−11; A 2.4/11 rating with Girls 6−11; A 2.3/10 rating with Kids 2−11)
1	1	"Johnny X"	Scott Fellows	Mike Kazaleh	September 17, 2005	001	257−962	3.0/14
2	2	"Johnny vs. Bling-Bling Boy"	Scott Fellows	Atomic Cartoons	September 24, 2005	002	257−963	3.0
2	2	"Johnny Impossible"	Scott Fellows	Brian Larsen	September 24, 2005	002	257−964	3.0
3	3	"Johnny Test: Party Monster"	Cynthia True	Brian Larsen	October 1, 2005	004	257−969	3.3
3	3	"Johnny Test: Extreme Crime Stopper"	Scott Fellows	Mike Kazaleh	October 1, 2005	004	257−968	3.3
4	4	"Deep Sea Johnny" "Aqua-Johnny"	Lazar Saric	Jun Falkenstein	October 8, 2005	003	257−965	2.8
4	4	"Johnny & the Amazing Turbo Action Backpack"	Eddie Guzelian	Atomic Cartoons	October 8, 2005	003	257−966	2.8
5	5	"Johnny and the Ice Pigs"	John Derevlany	Scott Shaw!	October 29, 2005	005	257−967	2.7
5	5	"Johnny's House of Horrors"	Eddie Guzelian	Jun Falkenstein	October 29, 2005	005	257−971	2.7
6	6	"Johnny's Super Smarty Pants"	Madellaine Paxson	Joe Banaszkiewicz	November 5, 2005	006	257−970	N/A
6	6	"Take Your Johnny to Work Day"	Scott Fellows	Karl Toerge	November 5, 2005	006	257−972	N/A
7	7	"Johnny and the Mega Roboticles"	Scott Fellows	Mike Kazaleh	November 12, 2005	007	257−973	1.7
7	7	"Johnny Gets Mooned"	Lazar Saric	Pat Ventura	November 12, 2005	007	257−974	1.7
8	8	"Johnny Hollywood"	Scott Fellows	Jun Falkenstein	November 19, 2005	008	257−976	N/A
8	8	"Johnny's Turbo Time Rewinder"	John Derevlany	Brian Larsen	November 19, 2005	008	257−975	N/A
9	9	"The Return of Johnny X"	Scott Fellows	Milton Knight	November 26, 2005	009	257−978	2.3/8
9	9	"Sonic Johnny"	Cynthia True	Brian Larsen	November 26, 2005	009	257−977	2.3/8
10	10	"The Dog Days of Johnny"	Michael Preister	Mike Kazaleh	February 11, 2006	010	257−979	1.8/8
10	10	"Johnny's Pink Plague"	John Derevlany	Nora Johnson	February 11, 2006	010	257−980	1.8/8
11	11	"Johnny's Extreme Game Controller"	Scott Fellows	Brian Larsen	February 18, 2006	011	257−981	2.2/9
11	11	"Li'l Johnny"	Lazar Saric	Jun Falkenstein	February 18, 2006	011	257−982	2.2/9
12	12	"Johnny vs. Brain Freezer"	Gene Grillo	Brian Larsen	July 22, 2006	012	257−984	1.0/8
12	12	"Johnny's Big Snow Job"	Mark Fellows	Brian Larsen	July 22, 2006	012	257−983	1.0/8
13	13	"Johnny Dodgeball"	Chris Brown	Mike Kazaleh	July 29, 2006	013	257−985	1.1/8
13	13	"Johnny & the Attack of the Monster Truck"	Scott Fellows	Jun Falkenstein	July 29, 2006	013	257−986	1.1/8

=== Season 2 (2006–07) ===
All episodes of this season were directed by Joseph Sherman.

No. overall	No. in season	Title	Written by	Storyboard by	Original release date	Show no.	Prod. code	K6−11 rating/share
14	1	"Hoist the Johnny Roger"	Adam Beechen	Julian Harris	October 28, 2006	014	201B	1.6/7
14	1	"Johnny's Turbo Toy Force"	Scott Fellows	Jeff Barker	October 28, 2006	014	201A	1.6/7
15	2	"JTV"	Scott Fellows	Dave Pemberton	November 4, 2006	015	202A	1.8/8
15	2	"Johnny vs. Bling Bling 2"	Scott Fellows	Jeff Barker	November 4, 2006	015	203B	1.8/8
16	3	"Johnnyland"	Mark Fellows	John Lei	November 11, 2006	016	204A	1.7/7
16	3	"Johnny's Got a Brand New Dad"	Adam Beechen	Dmitri Kostic	November 11, 2006	016	203A	1.7/7
17	4	"Saturday Night's Alright for Johnny"	Scott Gray	Julian Harris	November 18, 2006	017	204B	2.0/8
17	4	"Johnny Mint Chip"	Mark Fellows	Derek Jessome & Jeff Knott	November 18, 2006	017	202B	2.0/8
18	5	"Johnny's Pet Day"	Adam Beechen	Dave Pemberton	February 3, 2007	018	208	N/A
18	5	"Phat Johnny"	Scott Fellows	Julian Harris	February 3, 2007	018	208	N/A
19	6	"The Revenge of Johnny X"	Scott Fellows	Kevin Currie	February 10, 2007	019	205B	2.1/8
19	6	"The Enchanted Land of Johnnia"	Cynthia True	Dave Pemberton	February 10, 2007	019	205A	2.1/8
20	7	"101 Johnnies"	Scott Fellows	Naeim Khavari	February 17, 2007	020	207	1.8/7
20	7	"Johnny Zombie Tea Party"	Scott Fellows	Frank Ramirez	February 17, 2007	020	207	1.8/7
21	8	"Johnny Test in Black & White"	Scott Fellows	Jeff Barker	February 24, 2007	021	206	2.1/8
21	8	"Johnny the Kid"	Mark Fellows	Dan Nosella	February 24, 2007	021	206	2.1/8
22	9	"Down Hill Johnny"	Scott Fellows	Dave Pemberton	March 3, 2007	022	211B	1.5/6
22	9	"Johnny Meets the Pork-Ness Monster"	Mark Fellows	John Williamson & Frank Ramirez	March 3, 2007	022	209A	1.5/6
23	10	"Johnny X Strikes Back"	Scott Fellows	Dave Pemberton	April 21, 2007	023	213	1.8/7
23	10	"Johnny vs. Super Soaking Cyborgs"	Brian Cahill	Charles E. Bastien	April 21, 2007	023	213	1.8/7
24	11	"00-Johnny"	Scott Fellows	Jeff Barker	April 28, 2007	024	212	1.8/7
24	11	"Johnny of the Jungle"	Scott Fellows	Naeim Khavari	April 28, 2007	024	212	1.8/7
25	12	"Johnny vs. Smash Badger 3"	Scott Fellows	Naeim Khavari	May 5, 2007	025	210B	1.3/6
25	12	"Johnny Bee Good"	Kevin Hopps	Kevin Currie	May 5, 2007	025	211A	1.3/6
26	13	"The Good, the Bad & the Johnny"	Lazar Saric	Jeff Barker	May 12, 2007	026	210A	2.0/8
26	13	"Rock-a-Bye Johnny"	Scott Fellows	Dan Nosella	May 12, 2007	026	209B	2.0/8

=== Season 3 (2007–08) ===
All episodes in this season were directed by Larry Jacobs.

No. overall	No. in season	Title	Written by	Storyboard by	Original release date	Show no.	Prod. code	K6−11 rating/share
27	1	"Johnny vs. Bling-Bling 3"	Scott Fellows	John Lei	September 22, 2007	027	301	1.2/6
27	1	"Stinkin' Johnny"	Scott Fellows	Kevin Currie	September 22, 2007	027	301	1.2/6
28	2	"Johnny X and the Attack of the Snowmen"	Scott Fellows	Louie Escauriaga	September 29, 2007	028	302	1.5/7
28	2	"Johnny vs. Dukey"	Mark Fellows	Kervin Faria	September 29, 2007	028	302	1.5/7
29	3	"Here Johnny, Here Boy!"	Lazar Saric	Dave Pemberton	October 6, 2007	029	303	1.4/6
29	3	"Johnny Applesauce"	Adam Beechen	Kevin Currie	October 6, 2007	029	303	1.4/6
30	4	"Johnny'mon"	Scott Fellows	Charles E. Bastien	October 13, 2007	030	304	1.9/8
30	4	"Bathtime for Johnny"	Mark Fellows	Kervin Faria	October 13, 2007	030	304	1.9/8
31	5	"Johnny Test: Monster Starter"	Lazar Saric	Willy Ashworth	November 3, 2007	031	305B	1.5/6
31	5	"Johnny Holiday"	Scott Fellows	Kevin Currie	November 3, 2007	031	305A	1.5/6
32	6	"Coming to a Johnny Near You"	Ron Holsey	Kervin Faria	November 10, 2007	032	306	1.1/4
32	6	"When Johnny Comes Marching Home"	Scott Fellows	Dave Pemberton	November 10, 2007	032	306	1.1/4
33	7	"Johnnyitis"	Scott Fellows	Kevin Currie	December 1, 2007	033	307	1.2/5
33	7	"Johnny Mustache"	Keith Wagner	Kervin Faria	December 1, 2007	033	307	1.2/5
34	8	"Johnny Fu"	Mark Fellows	Naeim Khavari	December 15, 2007	034	308	1.4/6
34	8	"Johnny Escape from Bling-Bling Island"	Scott Fellows	Kevin Currie	December 15, 2007	034	308	1.4/6
35	9	"Johnny's Monkey Business"	Lazar Saric	Kervin Faria	January 26, 2008	035	309	0.9/4
35	9	"Johnny Bench"	Scott Fellows	Satjit Matharu	January 26, 2008	035	309	0.9/4
36	10	"Johnny Long Legs"	Spencer Walker	Kevin Currie	February 2, 2008	036	310	1.3/5
36	10	"Johnny Test in Outer Space"	Scott Fellows	Kervin Faria	February 2, 2008	036	310	1.3/5
37	11	"Johnny Cart Racing"	Scott Fellows	Dave Pemberton	February 16, 2008	037	311	1.4/6
37	11	"Johnny Smells Good"	Peter Johansen	Kevin Currie	February 16, 2008	037	311	1.4/6
38	12	"Return of Johnny'mon"	Scott Fellows	Kervin Faria	February 23, 2008	038	312	1.1/4
38	12	"Johnny Dukey Doo"	Mark Fellows	Dave Pemberton	February 23, 2008	038	312	1.1/4
39	13	"Johnny X: A New Beginning"	Scott Fellows	Kevin Currie	March 1, 2008	039	313	0.9/4
39	13	"Johnny X: The Final Ending"	Scott Fellows	Kervin Faria	March 1, 2008	039	313	0.9/4

=== Season 4 (2009–11) ===
No. overall	No. in season	Title	Directed by	Written by	Storyboard by	Original release date	Show no.	Prod. code	Viewers (millions)
40	1	"Johnny's New Baby Sisters"	Paul Riley	Scott Fellows	Lyndon Ruddy	November 9, 2009	040	401	N/A
40	1	"Porta-Johnny"	Paul Riley	Scott Fellows	Blair Kitchen	November 10, 2009	040	401	N/A
41	2	"Join the Johnny Scouts"	Paul Riley	Scott Fellows	Kevin Currie	November 11, 2009	041	402	N/A
41	2	"Johnny B.C."	Paul Riley	Scott Fellows	Jeff Barker	November 12, 2009	041	402	N/A
42	3	"Runaway Johnny"	Paul Riley	Scott Fellows	Jeff Barker	November 12, 2009	042	403	N/A
42	3	"Johnny on the Spot"	Paul Riley	Scott Fellows	Kervin Faria	November 12, 2009	042	403	N/A
43	4	"Dark Johnny"	Paul Riley	Scott Fellows	Dave Thomas	November 19, 2009	043	404	N/A
43	4	"No Homework for Johnny"	Paul Riley	Scott Fellows	Dave Pemberton	November 19, 2009	043	404	N/A
44	5	"Papa Johnny"	Paul Riley	Scott Fellows	Lyndon Ruddy	December 3, 2009	044	405	N/A
44	5	"The Johnnyminster Dog Show"	Paul Riley	Scott Fellows	Blair Kitchen	December 3, 2009	044	405	N/A
45	6	"Johnny's Amazing Cookie Company"	Paul Riley	Mark Fellows	Lyndon Ruddy	December 10, 2009	046	407	N/A
45	6	"Johnny's Big Dumb Sisters"	Paul Riley	Lazar Saric	Kevin Currie	December 10, 2009	046	407	N/A
46	7	"Dukey Jeckyll and Johnny Hyde"	Paul Riley	Scott Fellows	Dave Pemberton	January 7, 2010	045	406	1.08 (2-11) (Note: With children aged 2-11. This episode also received: 0.70 million viewers aged 6-11; 0.52 million viewers aged 9-14; To quote the press release: "Johnny Test earned even stronger delivery improvement among kids 6-11 (702,000, up 39%), kids 2-11 (1,076,000, up 51%) and kids 9-14 (515,000, up 56%).")
46	7	"Johnny's Trophy Case"	Paul Riley	Scott Fellows	Kevin Currie	January 14, 2010	045	406	1.05 (2-11) (Note: With children aged 2-11. This episode also received: 0.69 million viewers aged 6-11; To quote the press release: "Johnny Test’s kids 6-11 delivery (690,000) grew by 8% and kids 2-11 delivery (1,053,000) grew by 21%.")
47	8	"My Johnny Guard"	Paul Riley	Brad Birch	Jeff Barker	January 21, 2010	047	408	1.56
47	8	"Tom and Johnny"	Paul Riley	Scott Fellows	Dave Pemberton	January 28, 2010	047	408	1.77 (Note: This episode also received: 1.15 million viewers with children aged 2-11; 0.82 million viewers with boys aged 2-11; 0.81 million viewers with children aged 6-11; 0.56 million viewers with children aged 9-14; 0.47 million viewers with children boys aged 9-14; To quote the press release: "Even more impressively, Johnny Test (8 p.m.) saw kids 6-11 delivery (812,000) improve by 68%, kids 2-11 delivery (1,150,000) improve by 69% and kids 9-14 delivery (560,000) improve by 66%. Boys 2-11 delivery (818,000) jumped by 108% and boys 9-14 delivery (471,000) jumped by 126%.")
48	9	"The Quantum of Johnny"	Paul Riley	Scott Fellows	Blair Kitchen	February 4, 2010	048	409	1.67 (Note: This episode also received: 1.35 million viewers with children aged 2-11; 0.93 million viewers with children aged 6-11; 0.59 million viewers with children aged 9-14; To quote the press release: "Johnny Test earned 75% gains among kids 6-11 delivery (930,000), 73% gains among kids 2-11 delivery (1,346,000) and 42% gains among kids 9-14 delivery (587,000).")
48	9	"Johnny Get Yer Gum"	Paul Riley	Rick Groel	Rafael Alvarez	February 11, 2010	048	409	N/A
49	10	"Old School Johnny"	Paul Riley	Scott Fellows	Dave Thomas	February 18, 2010	049	410	1.23 (2-11) (Note: With children aged 2-11. This episode also received: 0.82 million viewers aged 6-11; 0.53 million viewers aged 9-14; To quote the press release: "Compared to the same time period last year, a brand new episode of Johnny Test earned 72% delivery improvement among kids 6-11 (815,000), 42% improvement among kids 2-11 (1,226,000) and 45% delivery improvement among kids 9-14 (528,000).")
49	10	"Johnny Degrees Below Zero"	Paul Riley	Keith Wagner	Dan Nosella	February 25, 2010	049	410	1.20 (2-11) (Note: With children aged 2-11. This episode also received: 0.81 million viewers aged 6-11; To quote the press release: "Johnny Test (Wednesdays, 8 p.m.) scored even higher growth averages, with kids 6-11 delivery (807,000) and ratings (3.3) increasing by 32%, and kids 2-11 delivery (1,201,000) increasing by 34% and ratings (2.9) by 32%. Boys demos for both animated series charted solid growth as well: delivery increased between 9% – 37%, and ratings between 7% – 34%.")
50	11	"Johnny Johnny"	Paul Riley	Mark Fellows	Lyndon Ruddy	April 8, 2010	050	411	N/A
50	11	"Johnny Double Coupons"	Paul Riley	Scott Fellows	Kevin Currie	April 5, 2010	050	411	N/A
51	12	"iJohnny"	Paul Riley	Scott Fellows	Jeff Barker	April 12, 2010	052	413	N/A
51	12	"Johnny vs. The Mummy"	Paul Riley	Mark Drop	Dave Pemberton	April 19, 2010	052	413	N/A
52	13	"X-Ray Johnny"	Paul Riley	Ron Holsey	Blair Kitchen	April 26, 2010	051	412	N/A
52	13	"The Destruction of Johnny X"	Paul Riley	Scott Fellows	Rafael Alvarez	May 3, 2010	051	412	N/A
53	14	"Johnny Grow Your Own Monster"	Paul Riley	Brad Birch	Rod Amador	May 10, 2010	053	414	N/A
53	14	"Who's Johnny?"	Paul Riley	Scott Fellows	Michael MacAdam	May 17, 2010	053	414	N/A
54	15	"Princess Johnny"	Paul Riley	Scott Fellows	Kevin Currie	May 24, 2010	054	415	N/A
54	15	"99 Deeds of Johnny Test"	Paul Riley	Rick Groel	Lyndon Ruddy	July 5, 2010	054	415	N/A
55	16	"Johnny's Amazing Race"	Paul Riley	Richard Clark	Jeff Barker	July 12, 2010	055	416	N/A
55	16	"Johnny Test in 3D"	Paul Riley	Scott Fellows	Dave Pemberton	July 19, 2010	055	416	N/A
56	17	"Guess Who's Coming to Johnny's for Dinner"	Paul Riley	Keith Wagner	Blair Kitchen	July 26, 2010	056	417	N/A
56	17	"Johnny's New BFF"	Paul Riley	Scott Fellows	Rafael Alvarez	August 2, 2010	056	417	N/A
57	18	"Johnny vs. Bling Bling IV"	Paul Riley	Scott Fellows	Michael MacAdam	August 9, 2010	057	418	N/A
57	18	"Johnny's Big Sisters' Smackdown"	Paul Riley	Lazar Saric	Kervin Faria	August 16, 2010	057	418	N/A
58	19	"Sunshine Malibu Johnny"	Paul Riley	Rick Groel	Lyndon Ruddy	August 23, 2010	058	419	N/A
58	19	"Johnnycicle"	Paul Riley	Scott Fellows	Kevin Currie	August 30, 2010	058	419	N/A
59	20	"King Johnny"	Paul Riley	Mark Fellows	Jeff Barker	September 6, 2010	059	420	N/A
59	20	"Johnny Re-Animated"	Paul Riley	Mark Drop	Dave Pemberton	September 13, 2010	059	420	N/A
60	21	"Johnny Cakes"	Paul Riley	Keith Wagner	Blair Kitchen	September 20, 2010	060	421	N/A
60	21	"Johnny Tube"	Paul Riley	Scott Fellows	Rafael Alvarez	September 27, 2010	060	421	N/A
61	22	"Sleepover at Johnny's"	Paul Riley	Scott Fellows	Jason Thompson	October 4, 2010	061	422	N/A
61	22	"Johnny's Got a... Wart!"	Paul Riley	Brad Birch	Kervin Faria	October 11, 2010	061	422	N/A
62	23	"Johnny's Royal Flush"	Larry Jacobs	Dale Schott	Lyndon Ruddy	October 18, 2010	062	423	2.15
62	23	"Johnny Test's Day Off"	Larry Jacobs	Scott Fellows	Kevin Currie	October 25, 2010	062	423	2.20
63	24	"Johnny and Dark Vegan's Battle Brawl Mania"	Larry Jacobs	Scott Fellows	Dave Pemberton	November 1, 2010	063	424	1.81
63	24	"A Scholarship for Johnny"	Larry Jacobs	Rick Groel	Jeff Barker	November 8, 2010	063	424	1.77
64	25	"Johnny Boat Racing"	Larry Jacobs	Scott Fellows	Rafael Alvarez	November 15, 2010	064	425	1.86
64	25	"Johnny Lock Down"	Larry Jacobs	Mark Fellows	Blair Kitchen	November 22, 2010	064	425	N/A
65	26	"Good Ol' Johnny Test"	John Lei	Lazar Saric	Kervin Faria	November 29, 2010	065	426	N/A
65	26	"Johnny X Strikes Back Again!"	John Lei	Scott Fellows	Dave Pemberton	September 12, 2011	065	426	1.41 (Note: This episode ranked #1 in its timeslot among boys 2-11, 6-11, and 9-14.)

=== Season 5 (2011–12) ===
Like season 3, all of the episodes are directed by Larry Jacobs.

No. overall	No. in season	Title	Written by	Storyboard by	Original release date	Show no.	Prod. code	Viewers (millions)
66	1	"Johnny Goes Nuts"	Keith Wagner	Kervin Faria	June 13, 2011	066	501	1.48 (2-11) (Note: With kids aged 2-11. This episode also received: 1.04 million viewers with children aged 6-11; 0.68 million viewers with tweens aged 9-14)
66	1	"Johnny Daddy Day"	Scott Fellows	Lyndon Ruddy	June 13, 2011	066	501	1.48 (2-11)
67	2	"Johnny Cruise"	Mark Fellows	Kevin Currie	June 20, 2011	067	502	N/A
67	2	"Rated J for Johnny"	Scott Fellows	Steve Whitehouse	June 20, 2011	067	502	N/A
68	3	"Spotless Johnny"	Brad Birch	David Thomas	June 27, 2011	068	503	N/A
68	3	"Johnny vs. Bling-Bling: The Ultimate Battle"	Scott Fellows	Jeff Barker	June 27, 2011	068	503	N/A
69	4	"Cat Scratch Johnny"	Keith Wagner	Dave Pemberton	July 11, 2011	069	504	N/A
69	4	"Johnny of the Deep"	Rick Groel	Gerry Fournier	July 11, 2011	069	504	N/A
70	5	"Johnny Swellville"	Brad Birch	Kervin Faria	July 18, 2011	070	505	N/A (Note: This episode saw ratings increase with kids 6-11 by 21%, and tweens 9-14 by 44%.)
70	5	"Johnny Irresistible"	Mark Fellows	Greg Hill	July 18, 2011	070	505	N/A
71	6	"Black & White & Johnny All Over"	Lazar Saric	Lyndon Ruddy	July 25, 2011	071B	506B	N/A
71	6	"Johnny's Rat Race"	Bobby Gaylor	Kevin Currie	July 25, 2011	071A	506A	N/A
72	7	"Lawn Gone Johnny"	Martin Olson	David Thomas	August 1, 2011	072	507	N/A (Note: This episode ranked #1 in all key boy demos for its time slot, and earned double and triple digit gains among kids and boys during its premiere.)
72	7	"Johnny's Ultimate Treehouse"	Mike Yank	Dave Pemberton	August 1, 2011	072	507	N/A
73	8	"Johnny Goes Camping"	Bobby Gaylor	Greg Hill	August 8, 2011	073	508	1.96 (Note: This episode ranked #1 in all key boy demos for its time slot.)
73	8	"Johnny's World Prank Wars 1"	Scott Fellows	Kervin Faria	August 15, 2011	073	508	N/A
74	9	"How to Become a John-i Knight"	Keith Wagner	Lyndon Ruddy	August 22, 2011	074	509	1.59
74	9	"The Return of Johnny Super Smarty Pants"	Josh Hamilton	Gerry Fournier	August 29, 2011	074	509	1.53
75	10	"Fangs a Lot Johnny"	Mark Drop	Steve Whitehouse	October 10, 2011	075	510	1.75
75	10	"Johnny Testosterone"	Scott Fellows	Jeff Barker	September 5, 2011	075	510	N/A
76	11	"Johnny's Keys to Success"	Rick Groel	Kevin Currie	September 19, 2011	076	511	N/A
76	11	"Johnny's Winter Jacket"	Scott Fellows	Dave Pemberton	September 26, 2011	076	511	N/A
77	12	"Johnny Two-Face"	John Derevlany	Steve Whitehouse	October 3, 2011	077	512	1.46
77	12	"Johnny Susan, Susan Johnny"	Rick Groel	David Thomas	November 7, 2011	077	512	N/A (Note: This episode ranked #1 with boys 9-14 for its timeslot.)
78	13	"Johnny Trick or Treat"	Bobby Gaylor	Kervin Faria	October 17, 2011	078	513	1.61 (Note: This episode was ranked #1 for boys 6-14 and kids 9-14 during its timeslot.)
78	13	"Nightmare on Johnny's Street"	Bobby Gaylor	Lyndon Ruddy	October 24, 2011	078	513	1.49
79	14	"My Dinner with Johnny"	Mark Fellows	Greg Hill	November 14, 2011	079	514	1.90
79	14	"Johnny Alternative"	Brad Birch	Jeff Barker	November 21, 2011	079	514	1.38
80	15	"Cool Hand Johnny"	Denise Downer	Steve Whitehouse	November 28, 2011	080	515	N/A
80	15	"Roller Johnny"	Jenny Keene	John Flagg	January 11, 2012	080	515	N/A
81	16	"A Holly Johnny Christmas"	Scott Fellows	Dave Pemberton	December 5, 2011	081	516	N/A
81	16	"Johnny's First Annual Snowball"	Scott Fellows	Steve Whitehouse	December 12, 2011	081	516	N/A
82	17	"Lakeside Johnny"	Story by : Lazar Saric; Teleplay by : Keith Wagner	Dave Pemberton	January 18, 2012	082	517	1.62
82	17	"Johnny Germ Fighter"	Stephen Sustarsic	Kevin Currie	January 25, 2012	082	517	N/A
83	18	"Johnny's World Record"	Merriwether Williams	Greg Hill	February 1, 2012	083	518	N/A
83	18	"Mush, Johnny, Mush"	Brad Birch	Kervin Faria	February 8, 2012	083	518	N/A
84	19	"Johnny's Treasure"	Josh Hamilton	Paul Brown	February 15, 2012	084	519	N/A
84	19	"Extra Credit Johnny"	Dean Stefan	Kevin Currie	February 22, 2012	084	519	N/A (Note: This episode ranked #1 in its timeslot with boys, receiving double and triple delivery gains versus the 2011 time period.)
85	20	"Johnny's Left Foot"	Mike Yank	Jeff Barker	March 7, 2012	085	520	N/A
85	20	"Johnny vs. The Tickler"	Johnny Derevlany	Greg Hill	March 14, 2012	085	520	N/A
86	21	"Bugged Out Johnny"	Mark Fellows	Kervin Faria	March 21, 2012	086	521	N/A
86	21	"Johnny Test's Quest"	Bobby Gaylor	Jeff Baker	March 28, 2012	086	521	N/A
87	22	"Johnny O's"	Jenny Keene	Tom Nesbitt	April 4, 2012	087	522	N/A
87	22	"It's Du-Kay Johnny"	Denise Downer	Robin Budd	April 11, 2012	087	522	N/A
88	23	"Magic Johnny"	Josh Hamilton	Steve Whitehouse	June 6, 2012	088	523	N/A (Note: This episode ranked as the #1 telecast of the day among boys and the #1 telecast of the day among all boys 2-11 & 6-11, receiving double and triple delivery gains versus the 2011 time period.)
88	23	"Dolly Johnny"	Mike Yank	Dave Pemberton	June 13, 2012	088	523	N/A
89	24	"Johnny McCool"	Brad Birch	Kevin Currie	June 20, 2012	089	524	N/A
89	24	"It's an Invasion, Johnny"	Phil Ivanusic	Greg Hill	June 27, 2012	089	524	N/A
90	25	"It's All Relative, Johnny"	Rick Groel	Jeff Barker	July 25, 2012	090	525	N/A
90	25	"Johnny Rich"	Dave Beatty	Steve Whitehouse	August 1, 2012	090	525	N/A
91	26	"Johnny X... Again?"	Bobby Gaylor	Dave Pemberton	August 8, 2012	091	526	N/A
91	26	"Green Johnny"	Bobby Gaylor	Chad Hicks & Greg Hill	August 15, 2012	091	526	N/A

=== Season 6 (2013–14) ===
All of the episodes in this season are directed by John Lei.

No. overall	No. in season	Title	Written by	Storyboard by	Original release date	Show no.	Prod. code	US viewers (millions)
92	1	"Johnny on the Clock"	Nathan Knetchel	Dave Pemberton	April 23, 2013	092	601	1.60
92	1	"Johnny X-Factor"	Scott Fellows	Steve Whitehouse	April 30, 2013	092	601	1.06
93	2	"Johnny Vets Dukey"	Keith Wagner	Paul Schibli	May 7, 2013	093	602	1.16 (Note: This episode ranked #1 with boys 6-11 and 9-14 in its premiere timeslot.)
93	2	"Johnny's #1 Fan"	Rick Groel	Kevin Currie	May 14, 2013	093	602	1.09
94	3	"How to Train Your Johnny"	Neal Dusedau	Kervin Faria	May 21, 2013	094	603	1.47
94	3	"Johnny and Clyde"	Nick Confalone	Dave Pemberton	May 28, 2013	094	603	1.39
95	4	"Johnny's Super Massive Kart Wheelies 7"	Mark Fellows	Katie Shanahan	June 4, 2013	095	604	1.53 (Note: This episode ranked #1 with boys 2-11, 6-11, and 9-14 in its premiere time slot, some of Cartoon Network's target demographics.)
95	4	"Smooth Talkin' Johnny"	Marcy Brown & Dennis Haley	Dmitri Kostic	June 11, 2013	095	604	1.57
96	5	"Johnny and the Beanstalk"	Dan Serafin	Greg Hill	June 18, 2013	096	605	1.27
96	5	"Johnny and Bling Bling Bond Bond"	Keith Wagner	Steve Whitehouse	June 25, 2013	096	605	1.15
97	6	"Johnny's Got Talent"	Story by : Brad Birch; Teleplay by : Sean Jara	Kevin Currie	July 2, 2013	097	606	1.47
97	6	"Johnny's Rough Around the Hedges"	Rick Groel	Kervin Faria	July 9, 2013	097	606	1.29
98	7	"Johnny's Head in the Clouds"	Nathan Knetchel	Dave Pemberton	July 16, 2013	098	607	1.00
98	7	"Stop in the Name of Johnny"	Ethan Banville	Paul Schibli & Jun Nasayao	July 23, 2013	098	607	1.48
99	8	"Johnny Opposite"	Marcy Brown & Dennis Haley	Joanne Rice & Paul Riley	July 30, 2013	099	608	0.99
99	8	"Johnny on the Job"	Story by : Neal Dusedau; Teleplay by : Dan Serafin	Katie Shanahan	August 13, 2013	099	608	1.31
100	9	"Johnny's 100th Episode"	Scott Fellows	Steve Whitehouse	August 20, 2013	100	609	1.34
100	9	"Johnny's Next Episode"	Scott Fellows	Steve Whitehouse	August 27, 2013	100	609	1.22
101	10	"Johnny's Supreme Theme"	Derek Dressler	Kevin Currie	September 3, 2013	101	610	1.23
101	10	"Past and Present Johnny"	Story by : Neal Dusedau; Teleplay by : Dan Serafin	Kervin Faria	September 11, 2013	101	610	1.17
102	11	"The Sands of Johnny"	Keith Wagner	Mo Sherwood	September 18, 2013	102	611	1.34
102	11	"Abominable Johnny"	Doug Lieblich	Dave Pemberton	September 25, 2013	102	611	1.29
103	12	"Johnny vs. The Dukenator"	Aaron Barnett	Steve Evangelatos	October 2, 2013	103	612	1.09
103	12	"Johnny's Petting Zoo Posse"	Sean Jara	Katie Shanahan	October 9, 2013	103	612	1.18
104	13	"The Johnny Who Saved Halloween"	Rick Groel	Greg Hill	October 16, 2013	104	613	1.16
104	13	"Johnny's Zombie Bomb"	Nick Confalone	Steve Whitehouse	October 23, 2013	104	613	1.45
105	14	"Johnny's New Super Mega Villain"	Ethan Banville	Kevin Currie	October 30, 2013	105	614	0.98
105	14	"Johnny in Charge"	Sean Jara	Kervin Faria	November 6, 2013	105	614	1.13
106	15	"Johnny Unplugged"	Mark Fellows	Mo Sherwood	November 13, 2013	106	615	1.20
106	15	"Johnny's Monster Mash"	Dan Serafin	Dave Pemberton	November 20, 2013	106	615	1.19
107	16	"Johnny's Chipmunk Chit Chat"	Rick Groel	Steve Evangelatos	December 4, 2013	107	616	1.33
107	16	"A Picture's Worth 1000 Johnnies"	Keith Wagner	Katie Shanahan	January 8, 2014	107	616	1.22
108	17	"Dial J for Johnny"	Derek Dressler	Greg Hill	January 14, 2014	108	617	1.49
108	17	"Road Trip Johnny"	Ethan Banville	Steve Whitehouse	January 21, 2014	108	617	1.63
109	18	"Code Crackin' Johnny"	Keith Wagner	Kervin Faria	January 28, 2014	109	618	1.21
109	18	"Johnny Goes Viral"	Nick Confalone	Kevin Currie	February 4, 2014	109	618	1.29
110	19	"FrankenJohnny"	Keith Wagner	Dave Pemberton	February 11, 2014	110	619	1.32
110	19	"Johnny Express"	Ethan Banville	Mo Sherwood	February 18, 2014	110	619	1.36 (Note: This episode ranked #1 with boys aged 9-14 in its premiere time slot.)
111	20	"Crash Test Johnny"	Derek Dressler	Brian Wong	February 25, 2014	111	620	1.35
111	20	"Johnny's Junky Trunk"	Sean Jara	John Flagg	March 4, 2014	111	620	1.05
112	21	"Super Johnny Action Federation"	Ethan Banville	Greg Hill	March 11, 2014	112	621	1.06
112	21	"Gil-Stopping Johnny"	Rick Groel	Steve Whitehouse	April 23, 2014	112	621	1.29
113	22	"Johnny with a Chance of Meatloaf"	Keith Wagner	Kevin Currie	April 30, 2014	113	622	1.24
113	22	"It's Easter, Johnny Test!"	Dan Serafin	Kervin Faria	April 9, 2014	113	622	N/A
114	23	"Future Johnny"	Derek Dressler	Mo Sherwood	May 14, 2014	114	623	N/A
114	23	"Dukey See, Johnny Do"	Story by : Sean Jara; Teleplay by : Derek Dressler	Dave Pemberton	December 25, 2014	114	623	N/A
115	24	"Hair's Johnny"	Story by : Sean Jara; Teleplay by : Keith Wagner	Dan Nosella	December 25, 2014	115	624	N/A
115	24	"Johnny's Hungry Games"	Story by : Nathan Knetchel; Teleplay by : Josh Hamilton	Kervin Faria	December 25, 2014	115	624	N/A
116	25	"Tiny Johnny"	Dan Serafin	Greg Hill	December 25, 2014	116	625	N/A
116	25	"Johnny Goes Gaming"	Story by : Scott Fellows; Teleplay by : Derek Dressler	Kevin Currie	December 25, 2014	116	625	N/A
117	26	"The Last Flight of Johnny X"	Keith Wagner	Steve Whitehouse	December 25, 2014	117	626	N/A
117	26	"Johnny's Last Chapter"	Nathan Knetchel	Dave Pemberton	December 25, 2014	117	626	N/A

== Web shorts (2020; 2026) ==
All of the shorts were directed by Ryan Denham.

Title	Written by	Original release date
"League of Johnnys"	Ryan Denham	May 2, 2020
"Johnny Be Ghost"	Matt Kreizenbeck & Ryan Denham	September 19, 2026
"Johnny Falls Flat"	Matt Kreizenbeck & Ryan Denham	September 25, 2026
"Johnny Beta Test"	Ali Lightfoot	September 26, 2026
"Johnny's Big Dukey"	Ali Lightfoot	October 2, 2026
"Johnny 9"	Ali Lightfoot	October 3, 2026
"Luchador Johnny"	Sulaymaan Iqbal	October 9, 2026
"Johnny Sea, Johnny Doomed"	Sulaymaan Iqbal	October 10, 2026
"Who's a Good Johnny?"	Jeremy Krause	October 16, 2026
"Johnny vs. Boogerman"	Jeremy Krause	October 17, 2026
"One Punch Johnny"	Luka Sheehan	October 23, 2026
"Mad Johnny"	Luka Sheehan	October 24, 2026
"404: Johnny Not Found"	Luka Sheehan	October 30, 2026
"Johnny Tube"	Ryan Denham	November 6, 2026
"Omega Johnny"	Ryan Denham	November 7, 2026
