= Johnny Test season 4 =

Johnny Test
- Season 4
- DVD cover
- Showrunner: Scott Fellows
- No. of episodes: 26 (52 segments)

Release
- Original network: Cartoon Network; Teletoon
- Original release: November 9, 2009 – September 12, 2011

Season chronology
- ← Previous; Season 3 Next → Season 5

The fourth season of the animated television series Johnny Test premiered on November 10, 2009, containing 26 full episodes. It was the first season to premiere on Teletoon first. This season began airing on Cartoon Network on November 9, 2009. This would be the final season for Louis Chirillo as Dukey and Mr. Teacherman. According to the credits, Warner Bros. still owns its trademark.

This season, along with the third season, was released on DVD in a bundle on September 13, 2011 in Region 1.

== Cast ==
- James Arnold Taylor as Johnny Test
- Louis Chirillo as Dukey
- Ashleigh Ball as Mary Test
- Maryke Hendrikse as Susan Test

== Episodes ==
No. overall	No. in season	Title	Directed by	Written by	Storyboard by	Original release date	Show no.	Prod. code	Viewers (millions)
40	1	"Johnny's New Baby Sisters"	Paul Riley	Scott Fellows	Lyndon Ruddy	November 9, 2009	040	401	N/A
40	1	"Porta-Johnny"	Paul Riley	Scott Fellows	Blair Kitchen	November 10, 2009	040	401	N/A
Susan and Mary purposely revert themselves back into babies while the parents are out, and Johnny has to keep them safe from the irresponsible babysitter Gil; this interferes with a party he and Dukey had been planning and Mr. and Mrs. Test are mad. Johnny tricks his sisters into letting him have teleporting powers by threatening to use water with green food coloring that he said that he mixed ingredients from the unstable cabinet. When they find out, Susan and Mary mess with the powers to get revenge. Later the twins accidentally get them caught in a middle of an art robbery.
41	2	"Join the Johnny Scouts"	Paul Riley	Scott Fellows	Kevin Currie	November 11, 2009	041	402	N/A
41	2	"Johnny B.C."	Paul Riley	Scott Fellows	Jeff Barker	November 12, 2009	041	402	N/A
After Johnny lands his bike into a garbage truck, he becomes a Lady Bird Scout and tries to sell 1,000 boxes of cookies to get a new one. Little does he know, Sissy wants the bike as well, but for a better reason. Johnny goes back in time in order to get a sloth bone for the twins, but when he returns he becomes a caveman, blowing off his grounding for selling Hugh's personal items and from leaving the house.
42	3	"Runaway Johnny"	Paul Riley	Scott Fellows	Jeff Barker	November 12, 2009	042	403	N/A
42	3	"Johnny on the Spot"	Paul Riley	Scott Fellows	Kervin Faria	November 12, 2009	042	403	N/A
Johnny and Dukey run away when Johnny's parents say he's old enough to do chores but not old enough to watch PG-13-rated movies. Johnny steals a portable black hole, which later creates an early apocalypse.
43	4	"Dark Johnny"	Paul Riley	Scott Fellows	Dave Thomas	November 19, 2009	043	404	N/A
43	4	"No Homework for Johnny"	Paul Riley	Scott Fellows	Dave Pemberton	November 19, 2009	043	404	N/A
Johnny joins forces with Dark Vegan to get him back to his home planet. Susan and Mary build Johnny a robot in order to help him do his homework, but the robot ends up stealing things for Johnny.
44	5	"Papa Johnny"	Paul Riley	Scott Fellows	Lyndon Ruddy	December 3, 2009	044	405	N/A
44	5	"The Johnnyminster Dog Show"	Paul Riley	Scott Fellows	Blair Kitchen	December 3, 2009	044	405	N/A
Johnny is tired of being annoyed and tied up by Hugh. So Susan and Mary switch Johnny and Hugh's brains after the two make a bet that involves taking on each other's lives. Johnny and Dukey try to get in a dog show which only allows purebred dogs.
45	6	"Johnny's Amazing Cookie Company"	Paul Riley	Mark Fellows	Lyndon Ruddy	December 10, 2009	046	407	N/A
45	6	"Johnny's Big Dumb Sisters"	Paul Riley	Lazar Saric	Kevin Currie	December 10, 2009	046	407	N/A
Susan and Mary make fortune cookies that come true, and Johnny sells them with the typical drastic results. The twins' latest invention accidentally blasts them into "Dumbville" thanks to Johnny right before their scholarship interview.
46	7	"Dukey Jeckyll and Johnny Hyde"	Paul Riley	Scott Fellows	Dave Pemberton	January 7, 2010	045	406	1.08 (2-11) (Note: With children aged 2-11. This episode also received: 0.70 million viewers aged 6-11; 0.52 million viewers aged 9-14; To quote the press release: "Johnny Test earned even stronger delivery improvement among kids 6-11 (702,000, up 39%), kids 2-11 (1,076,000, up 51%) and kids 9-14 (515,000, up 56%).")
46	7	"Johnny's Trophy Case"	Paul Riley	Scott Fellows	Kevin Currie	January 14, 2010	045	406	1.05 (2-11) (Note: With children aged 2-11. This episode also received: 0.69 million viewers aged 6-11; To quote the press release: "Johnny Test’s kids 6-11 delivery (690,000) grew by 8% and kids 2-11 delivery (1,053,000) grew by 21%.")
Dukey drinks a liquid which makes him turn into a monster. To make matters worse, a dog catcher (and later Mr. Black and Mr. White) are after him. Johnny wants to get a trophy to put in his trophy case. He tries stuff that makes Hugh lose money and get less than $1,000,000. Susan, Mary and Hugh get obsessed with winning, so the three of them enter the Porkbelly River Jump-Off to win $1 million and a trophy. They win in the end, but Dukey destroys the neighbors house and bye-bye million dollars.
47	8	"My Johnny Guard"	Paul Riley	Brad Birch	Jeff Barker	January 21, 2010	047	408	1.56
47	8	"Tom and Johnny"	Paul Riley	Scott Fellows	Dave Pemberton	January 28, 2010	047	408	1.77 (Note: This episode also received: 1.15 million viewers with children aged 2-11; 0.82 million viewers with boys aged 2-11; 0.81 million viewers with children aged 6-11; 0.56 million viewers with children aged 9-14; 0.47 million viewers with children boys aged 9-14; To quote the press release: "Even more impressively, Johnny Test (8 p.m.) saw kids 6-11 delivery (812,000) improve by 68%, kids 2-11 delivery (1,150,000) improve by 69% and kids 9-14 delivery (560,000) improve by 66%. Boys 2-11 delivery (818,000) jumped by 108% and boys 9-14 delivery (471,000) jumped by 126%.")
Johnny gets hired to stop Bling-Bling from kissing Susan, but Johnny turns on the sisters once Bling-Bling bribes him. In a parody of Tom and Jerry, Johnny turns into a mouse for Susan and Mary, but when Mr. Mittens comes, things get chaotic.
48	9	"The Quantum of Johnny"	Paul Riley	Scott Fellows	Blair Kitchen	February 4, 2010	048	409	1.67 (Note: This episode also received: 1.35 million viewers with children aged 2-11; 0.93 million viewers with children aged 6-11; 0.59 million viewers with children aged 9-14; To quote the press release: "Johnny Test earned 75% gains among kids 6-11 delivery (930,000), 73% gains among kids 2-11 delivery (1,346,000) and 42% gains among kids 9-14 delivery (587,000).")
48	9	"Johnny Get Yer Gum"	Paul Riley	Rick Groel	Rafael Alvarez	February 11, 2010	048	409	N/A
Johnny tries to get invited to a party to stop a villain. Mr. Whacko invents a new helium gum called Helio Bubble that lifts kids into the sky, and Johnny must save them.
49	10	"Old School Johnny"	Paul Riley	Scott Fellows	Dave Thomas	February 18, 2010	049	410	1.23 (2-11) (Note: With children aged 2-11. This episode also received: 0.82 million viewers aged 6-11; 0.53 million viewers aged 9-14; To quote the press release: "Compared to the same time period last year, a brand new episode of Johnny Test earned 72% delivery improvement among kids 6-11 (815,000), 42% improvement among kids 2-11 (1,226,000) and 45% delivery improvement among kids 9-14 (528,000).")
49	10	"Johnny Degrees Below Zero"	Paul Riley	Keith Wagner	Dan Nosella	February 25, 2010	049	410	1.20 (2-11) (Note: With children aged 2-11. This episode also received: 0.81 million viewers aged 6-11; To quote the press release: "Johnny Test (Wednesdays, 8 p.m.) scored even higher growth averages, with kids 6-11 delivery (807,000) and ratings (3.3) increasing by 32%, and kids 2-11 delivery (1,201,000) increasing by 34% and ratings (2.9) by 32%. Boys demos for both animated series charted solid growth as well: delivery increased between 9% – 37%, and ratings between 7% – 34%.")
Johnny travels to 1845 when school was easier, but he gets stuck there due the power supplier for the Turbo Time Tea not being invented yet. The sisters and Johnny try to find outdated technology to power the tea house. First, they try the Great Fire of Prokbelly, but Dukey sabotages it. They, then try methane, but it takes 59 years to charge. More methane from the train is eventually obtained to power the machine and get back to the present. Johnny uses a device that the Test twins told him not to extend 5000 newtons, but he doesn't listen and creates a magnetic force field on the Earth which makes Porkbelly the new North Pole.
50	11	"Johnny Johnny"	Paul Riley	Mark Fellows	Lyndon Ruddy	April 8, 2010	050	411	N/A
50	11	"Johnny Double Coupons"	Paul Riley	Scott Fellows	Kevin Currie	April 5, 2010	050	411	N/A
Black and White make Johnny and Dukey robots, but become corrupted and are now evil. They spit meatballs at Hugh, brake Lilas car, and trash the lab. The real Johnny and Dukey get framed for doing that stuff and for doing stuff around Porkbelly. Johnny keeps attempting to ride down Suicide Hill, but Susan and Mary keep redeeming Johnny's coupons.
51	12	"iJohnny"	Paul Riley	Scott Fellows	Jeff Barker	April 12, 2010	052	413	N/A
51	12	"Johnny vs. The Mummy"	Paul Riley	Mark Drop	Dave Pemberton	April 19, 2010	052	413	N/A
The twins upgrade Johnny's new cell phone. Later the phone becomes too intelligent and begins hacking government space missiles. Johnny goes on a trip to the museum and uses a spray to bring the things to life, including a mummy.
52	13	"X-Ray Johnny"	Paul Riley	Ron Holsey	Blair Kitchen	April 26, 2010	051	412	N/A
52	13	"The Destruction of Johnny X"	Paul Riley	Scott Fellows	Rafael Alvarez	May 3, 2010	051	412	N/A
Johnny gets X-Ray goggles. Meanwhile, Zizlar tries to steal the Porkbelly library with a series of subterranean bombs. Johnny and Dukey decide to remain in super hero mode permanently, but they find being a superhero is more difficult than they think.
53	14	"Johnny Grow Your Own Monster"	Paul Riley	Brad Birch	Rod Amador	May 10, 2010	053	414	N/A
53	14	"Who's Johnny?"	Paul Riley	Scott Fellows	Michael MacAdam	May 17, 2010	053	414	N/A
Johnny's mail order foam monster becomes a real monster once the twins swap the water with their glass of "side effects wicth was used to make the monster evolve". When Sissy considers Johnny too gross to help her in a science project, he begs Susan and Mary to change his personality.
54	15	"Princess Johnny"	Paul Riley	Scott Fellows	Kevin Currie	May 24, 2010	054	415	N/A
54	15	"99 Deeds of Johnny Test"	Paul Riley	Rick Groel	Lyndon Ruddy	July 5, 2010	054	415	N/A
Johnny poses as a princess in order to prevent a war. Meanwhile, Susan and Mary decide that they would like to act like normal girls. After getting his 99th detention, Johnny learns he must perform 99 good deeds or he will be sent to military school.
55	16	"Johnny's Amazing Race"	Paul Riley	Richard Clark	Jeff Barker	July 12, 2010	055	416	N/A
55	16	"Johnny Test in 3D"	Paul Riley	Scott Fellows	Dave Pemberton	July 19, 2010	055	416	N/A
Johnny and Dukey challenge his sisters, their friends, and their enemies to a survival challenge in which the winning team gets hundreds of dollars in gift certificates. While the Tests go on vacation, Johnny sneaks Dukey into the hotel but they get kicked out and try to get back in the hotel room 3D and avoid the hotel manager that doesn't allow dogs.
56	17	"Guess Who's Coming to Johnny's for Dinner"	Paul Riley	Keith Wagner	Blair Kitchen	July 26, 2010	056	417	N/A
56	17	"Johnny's New BFF"	Paul Riley	Scott Fellows	Rafael Alvarez	August 2, 2010	056	417	N/A
Mr. Black moves in with the Tests after he embarrasses Mr. White at the dance contest auditions. Johnny's parents keep setting Johnny up with new friends. When those don't work out, Johnny reveals Dukey's intelligence. Later, Dukey spends more time helping Johnny's parents instead of playing with Johnny.
57	18	"Johnny vs. Bling Bling IV"	Paul Riley	Scott Fellows	Michael MacAdam	August 9, 2010	057	418	N/A
57	18	"Johnny's Big Sisters' Smackdown"	Paul Riley	Lazar Saric	Kervin Faria	August 16, 2010	057	418	N/A
Johnny once again has to protect Susan from Bling-Bling Boy who is determined to have her as his valentine. Susan and Mary both want Gil to go on a date with them, so they put up a wrestling match using rough guts (Susan uses Johnny's while Mary uses a lion's), but it leads to destructive results.
58	19	"Sunshine Malibu Johnny"	Paul Riley	Rick Groel	Lyndon Ruddy	August 23, 2010	058	419	N/A
58	19	"Johnnycicle"	Paul Riley	Scott Fellows	Kevin Currie	August 30, 2010	058	419	N/A
Johnny goes to the beach to surf, but there are no waves, so Susan and Mary build a wave making machine and special surfboard for him. When Johnny turns it to Don't Even Think About It Johnny, a wave is sent to the beach, and they must send it to Australia. Johnny and Dukey try to help Brain Freezer get a girlfriend.
59	20	"King Johnny"	Paul Riley	Mark Fellows	Jeff Barker	September 6, 2010	059	420	N/A
59	20	"Johnny Re-Animated"	Paul Riley	Mark Drop	Dave Pemberton	September 13, 2010	059	420	N/A
Johnny becomes obsessed with domination after Susan and Mary bring his chess pieces to life. Johnny uses one of his sisters' inventions to bring two cartoon characters Dawg & Bone to the real world in order to scare Sissy out of the house, but the characters mistake Porkbelly for a zombie world and try to destroy it.
60	21	"Johnny Cakes"	Paul Riley	Keith Wagner	Blair Kitchen	September 20, 2010	060	421	N/A
60	21	"Johnny Tube"	Paul Riley	Scott Fellows	Rafael Alvarez	September 27, 2010	060	421	N/A
It's Lila's birthday and the family spends the morning to make her birthday a success. Johnny struggles to make her breakfast, Hugh tries to figure out a good but inexpensive gift for her, and the twins keep Lila trapped in her bedroom until Hugh and Johnny are ready. Johnny wants to become an Internet sensation trying to record a successful video.
61	22	"Sleepover at Johnny's"	Paul Riley	Scott Fellows	Jason Thompson	October 4, 2010	061	422	N/A
61	22	"Johnny's Got a... Wart!"	Paul Riley	Brad Birch	Kervin Faria	October 11, 2010	061	422	N/A
In a parody of The Cat in the Hat, Johnny is dragged into Susan and Mary's plan to get Gil to be in a sleepover, but Bling-Bling Boy and Dark Vegan's daughter Jillian become involved as well, with usual chaos ensuing. Johnny gets a wart, and when his sisters try to get rid of it, they unintentionally give the wart intelligence. At first the wart seems to make Johnny's life better, but he tries to take over his body as he gets more powerful.
62	23	"Johnny's Royal Flush"	Larry Jacobs	Dale Schott	Lyndon Ruddy	October 18, 2010	062	423	2.15
62	23	"Johnny Test's Day Off"	Larry Jacobs	Scott Fellows	Kevin Currie	October 25, 2010	062	423	2.20
When Susan and Mary turn Johnny into a fish as part of one of their experiments, Hugh flushes him down the toilet by mistake where he ends up in the sewer, and he has to swim for his life when he runs into an alligator. Johnny ditches school with a relentless truant officer in hot pursuit.
63	24	"Johnny and Dark Vegan's Battle Brawl Mania"	Larry Jacobs	Scott Fellows	Dave Pemberton	November 1, 2010	063	424	1.81
63	24	"A Scholarship for Johnny"	Larry Jacobs	Rick Groel	Jeff Barker	November 8, 2010	063	424	1.77
Dark Vegan once again tries to destroy Johnny, who is trying to cheer up lonely Repto-Slicer. Hugh wants to train Johnny to be good at sports so that he can get a sports scholarship for college.
64	25	"Johnny Boat Racing"	Larry Jacobs	Scott Fellows	Rafael Alvarez	November 15, 2010	064	425	1.86
64	25	"Johnny Lock Down"	Larry Jacobs	Mark Fellows	Blair Kitchen	November 22, 2010	064	425	N/A
Johnny, his friends, and his enemies all compete in a boat race against an arrogant rowing team. Johnny is determined to get a flytrap plant from his sisters for his school's science fair.
65	26	"Good Ol' Johnny Test"	John Lei	Lazar Saric	Kervin Faria	November 29, 2010	065	426	N/A
65	26	"Johnny X Strikes Back Again!"	John Lei	Scott Fellows	Dave Pemberton	September 12, 2011	065	426	1.41 (Note: This episode ranked #1 in its timeslot among boys 2-11, 6-11, and 9-14.)
Johnny is in charge of the school play about recycling while Susan and Mary create a garbage-eating monster. After taking away the entire lab, the General accidentally creates two mutant super agents that take over the world. It's up to Johnny X and his friends to stop them and save the world. Note: This was the last episode with Louis Chirillo as Dukey.
