= Johnny Test (2021 TV series) =

Canadian animated television series

- Genre: Science fantasy; Action; Adventure; Comedy
- Created by: Scott Fellows
- Developed by: WildBrain
- Showrunner: Scott Fellows
- Voices of: James Arnold Taylor; Trevor Devall; Emily Tennant; Maryke Hendrikse; Ian James Corlett; Kathleen Barr
- Theme music composer: Adam Schlesinger
- Composer: Guy Moon
- Countries of origin: United States; Canada
- Original language: English
- No. of seasons: 2
- No. of episodes: 40

Production
- Executive producers: Scott Fellows; Loris Kramer Lunsford; Stephanie Betts; Anne Loi; Josh Scherba
- Producer: Devon Cody
- Running time: 11–12 minutes
- Production company: WildBrain Studios

Original release
- Network: Netflix
- Release: July 16, 2021 – January 7, 2022

Related
- Johnny Test (2005–14)

Johnny Test is a animated television series created by Scott Fellows, developed by WildBrain and a revival to the 2005 series of the same name. The series premiered on July 16, 2021, on Netflix, and also premiered on Family Chrgd on October 16, 2021. An interactive special, titled Johnny Test's Ultimate Meatloaf Quest, premiered on November 16. However, the special was removed from Netflix on December 1, 2024, along with other interactive specials. The second and final season was released on January 7, 2022.

== Plot ==
Built from the original run of the series, the revived Johnny Test introduces a re-imagined Johnny, his genius sisters Susan and Mary, and his talking dog Dukey.

Premise

11-year-old Johnny Test is a suburban boy who resides in the fictional town of Porkbelly, which is somewhere in the United States. He is often used as a test subject for his genius sisters Susan and Mary’s inventions and experiments, whether these are gadgets or superpowers. Their experiments always cause problems that Johnny and his dog, Dukey, must resolve, and they sometimes fight villains and save the world with their inventions in the process.

== Voice cast ==
- James Arnold Taylor as Johnny Test, Hank Anchorman, Mr. Mittens, Dark Vegan
- Trevor Devall as Dukey, Mr. Henry Teacherman
- Emily Tennant as Mary Test
- Maryke Hendrikse as Susan Test
- Ian James Corlett as Hugh Test
- Kathleen Barr as Lila Test
- Bill Mondy as Mr. Black, Brain Freezer
- Deven Mack as Mr. White
- Lee Tockar as The General, Bling Bling Boy, Albert, Speed McCool
- Andrew Francis as Gil
- Scott McNeil as King Zizrar

== Production and development ==
On June 11, 2013, Teletoon and Cartoon Network both announced the series' renewal for a seventh season consisting of 13 episodes and a three-part special. However, in response to a tweet on June 25, 2015, voice actor James Arnold Taylor stated that he wasn't aware of any plans for more seasons.

In January 2020, WildBrain announced that their Vancouver studio was hiring for a new Johnny Test project separate from a planned series of new Johnny Test web shorts (the first of which was released on May 2, 2020, but later made private). On May 6, 2020, WildBrain confirmed the series had been picked up by Netflix for two more seasons and a 66-minute interactive special set for release in 2021, with Fellows returning as showrunner and executive producer. In June 2021, it was announced that most of the main cast would reprise their respective roles.

The music for the reboot was composed by Guy Moon, who previously worked on Fellows' live action shows Ned's Declassified School Survival Guide, Big Time Rush and 100 Things to Do Before High School, as well as The Adventures of Rocky and Bullwinkle (2018–2019) which was executive produced by Fellows.

Despite leaving the original series' production, the trademark of the reboot and the characters still remains at Warner Bros. Entertainment, Inc.

== Episodes ==
=== Series overview ===
Season	Episodes	Originally released
1	20	July 16, 2021
Special		November 16, 2021
2	20	January 7, 2022

=== Season 1 (2021) ===
No. overall	No. in season	Title	Directed by	Written by	Storyboard by	Original release date	Prod. code
1	1	"Johnny's Battle Royale"	Tim Stuby	Scott Fellows	Anna Latzer	July 16, 2021	703B
2	2	"Johnny's New Baby Brother"	Jim Miller	Scott Fellows	Megan Parker	July 16, 2021	706A
3	3	"Johnny's Bling Bling Buddy"	Tim Stuby	Lazar Saric	Peter MacAdams	July 16, 2021	705B
4	4	"Johnny Unboxed"	Tim Stuby	Alex Mack	Desirae Salmark	July 16, 2021	707B
5	5	"The Silence of the Johnny"	Jim Miller	Rick Groel	Tori Grant	July 16, 2021	704A
6	6	"Johnny'Mon Go!"	Tim Stuby & Jim Miller	Nathan Knetchel	Jeff Bittle	July 16, 2021	701A
7	7	"Knowing Johnny Inside and Out"	Tim Stuby	Nathan Knetchel	Megan Willis	July 16, 2021	704B
8	8	"JTA - Johnny Talent Agency"	Tim Stuby	Scott Fellows	Desirae Salmark	July 16, 2021	702B
9	9	"Johnny the 13th"	Jim Miller	Mike Leffingwell	Marta Demong	July 16, 2021	703A
10	10	"Johnny's New 'Do"	Tim Stuby & Jim Miller	Lazar Saric	Jeff Bittle	July 16, 2021	701B
11	11	"Johnny's Roman Holiday"	Tim Stuby	Nathan Knetchel	Jeff Bittle	July 16, 2021	706B
12	12	"Johnny Fest"	Jim Miller	Mark Fellows	Aynsley King	July 16, 2021	705A
13	13	"Johnny with 1000 Faces"	Tim Stuby	Nathan Knetchel	Megan Willis	July 16, 2021	709B
14	14	"Johnny's Yard Sale"	Tim Stuby	Mark Fellows	Anna Latzer	July 16, 2021	708B
15	15	"The Masked Johnny"	Jim Miller	Alex Mack	Carrie Mombourquette	July 16, 2021	702A
16	16	"Say Cheese Johnny"	Jim Miller	Lazar Saric	Marta Demong	July 16, 2021	708A
17	17	"Johnny's Mazed and Confused"	Tim Stuby	Rick Groel	Peter MacAdams	July 16, 2021	710B
18	18	"Johnny is the New Black"	Jim Miller	Scott Fellows	Aynsley King	July 16, 2021	710A
19	19	"Johnny Test, 90210"	Jim Miller	Mike Leffingwell	Joel Dickie	July 16, 2021	707A
20	20	"Johnny's Holiday Light Fight"	Jim Miller	Scott Fellows	Tori Grant	July 16, 2021	709A

=== Special (2021) ===
Title	Directed by	Written by	Storyboard by	Original release date
"Johnny Test's Ultimate Meatloaf Quest"	Tim Stuby & Jim Miller	Scott Fellows, Tim Stuby & Jim Miller	Jeff Bittle & Megan Parker	November 16, 2021

=== Season 2 (2022) ===
No. overall	No. in season	Title	Directed by	Written by	Storyboard by	Original release date	Prod. code
21	1	"Johnny's Got a Brand New Mom"	Jim Miller	Mike Leffingwell	Marta Demong	January 7, 2022	803A
22	2	"Johnny's Battle Royale 2"	Tim Stuby	Scott Fellows	Desirae Salmark	January 7, 2022	807B
23	3	"The Wizard of Johnny"	Tim Stuby	Lazar Saric	Peter MacAdams	January 7, 2022	805B
24	4	"Johnny's Goodluck Charm"	Jim Miller	Mike Leffingwell	Megan Parker	January 7, 2022	801A
25	5	"Johnny's Scary Fairy Tales"	Tim Stuby	Lazar Saric	Desirae Salmark	January 7, 2022	802B
26	6	"The Revenge of Johnny's Baby Bro"	Jim Miller	Scott Fellows	Anna Latzer	January 7, 2022	808B
27	7	"Johnny vs. Señor Crabo"	Tim Stuby	Lazar Saric	Anna Latzer	January 7, 2022	803B
28	8	"Escape from Johnny's House"	Jim Miller	Mike Leffingwell	Erika Schnellert	January 7, 2022	802A
29	9	"Johnny the Monster Slayer"	Jim Miller	Scott Fellows	Aynsley King	January 7, 2022	810A
30	10	"Johnny'Mon Go! Again"	Tim Stuby	Scott Fellows	Megan Willis	January 7, 2022	809B
31	11	"Return to the Wizard of Johnny"	Tim Stuby	Scott Fellows	Tori Grant	January 7, 2022	809A
32	12	"Johnny Presents: The Dukey Channel"	Jim Miller	Scott Fellows	Megan Parker	January 7, 2022	806A
33	13	"Johnny's Super Smart House"	Tim Stuby	Nathan Knetchel	Megan Willis	January 7, 2022	804B
34	14	"Johnny and the Squishy Wooshies"	Jim Miller	Scott Fellows	Tori Grant	January 7, 2022	804A
35	15	"Johnny's Game of Bones"	Tim Stuby	Nathan Knetchel	Jeff Bittle	January 7, 2022	801B
36	16	"Johnny Con"	Jim Miller	Charlie Fellows	Erika Schnellert	January 7, 2022	807A
37	17	"Johnny's Got Game"	Jim Miller	Nathan Knetchel	Aynsley King	January 7, 2022	805A
38	18	"Johnny Dent"	Jim Miller	Mark Fellows	Harinam Virdee	January 7, 2022	808A
39	19	"5 Seconds of Johnny"	Tim Stuby	Tim Stuby	Jeff Bittle	January 7, 2022	806B
40	20	"Johnny's Melee Mayhem"	Tim Stuby	Scott Fellows	Peter MacAdams	January 7, 2022	810B
