= Johnny Test season 3 =

Johnny Test
- Season 3
- DVD cover
- Showrunner: Scott Fellows
- No. of episodes: 13 (26 segments)

Release
- Original network: Kids' WB (The CW); Teletoon
- Original release: September 22, 2007 – March 1, 2008

Season chronology
- ← Previous; Season 2 Next → Season 4

The third season of the animated television series Johnny Test premiered on September 22, 2007, with "Johnny vs. Bling-Bling 3" and "Stinkin' Johnny" and ended on March 1, 2008, with episodes "Johnny X: A New Beginning" and "Johnny X: The Final Ending". As of this season, Cookie Jar Entertainment and for the final time (due to shutting down in 2008) Collideascope Animation Studios, worked on the show.

This season, along with the fourth season, was released on DVD in a bundle on September 13, 2011, in Region 1. This would be the final season of the show that would air on the Kids' WB block.

== Cast ==
- James Arnold Taylor as Johnny Test
- Louis Chirillo as Dukey
- Ashleigh Ball as Mary Test
- Maryke Hendrikse as Susan Test

== Episodes ==
All episodes in this season were directed by Larry Jacobs.

No. overall	No. in season	Title	Written by	Storyboard by	Original release date	Show no.	Prod. code	K6−11 rating/share
27	1	"Johnny vs. Bling-Bling 3"	Scott Fellows	John Lei	September 22, 2007	027	301	1.2/6
27	1	"Stinkin' Johnny"	Scott Fellows	Kevin Currie	September 22, 2007	027	301	1.2/6
When Eugene finds out that Johnny is who stands in the way of him and Susan, he sets out to lock Johnny up forever as he tries to get the last ingredient for his sister's "Susan-hating lozenge". When Eugene eats it, Susan's problem is finally over, but it's now Mary's problem. Johnny joins a professional wrestling competition so he can win $10,000. He gets kidnapped by "The Caveman" after he ran out of perfume.
28	2	"Johnny X and the Attack of the Snowmen"	Scott Fellows	Louie Escauriaga	September 29, 2007	028	302	1.5/7
28	2	"Johnny vs. Dukey"	Mark Fellows	Kervin Faria	September 29, 2007	028	302	1.5/7
Brain Freezer creates an army of snowmen, and only Johnny X can stop him. After Johnny and Dukey send Bumper packing, they start to come against each other in a game of "Say Uncle". This turns into an epic battle with no winner.
29	3	"Here Johnny, Here Boy!"	Lazar Saric	Dave Pemberton	October 6, 2007	029	303	1.4/6
29	3	"Johnny Applesauce"	Adam Beechen	Kevin Currie	October 6, 2007	029	303	1.4/6
Fed up with the lack of respect, Dukey convinces Mary and Susan to turn Johnny into a dog. In the meantime, Mary and Susan turn themselves into animals so they can gain the affection of Gil. It all goes wrong when Animal Control arrives and snatches them. After hearing about American heroes in Social Studies class, Johnny is inspired to be a hero. When the lunch lady stops serving applesauce, Johnny decides to help his classmates by bringing back applesauce as a vigilante and becomes Johnny Applesauce. However, this lands him into trouble.
30	4	"Johnny'mon"	Scott Fellows	Charles E. Bastien	October 13, 2007	030	304	1.9/8
30	4	"Bathtime for Johnny"	Mark Fellows	Kervin Faria	October 13, 2007	030	304	1.9/8
Johnny, Dukey, Susan, and Mary are transported into Tiny'Mon and they must defeat Blast Ketchup and Kadoomerang using Cuddlebuns for protection. Johnny refuses to bathe, and his family forcibly attempts to wash him. Meanwhile, Dukey is mad because he thinks Johnny forgot his birthday. However, Johnny didn't and that's the reason he didn't bathe, so he could get Dukey the best present ever.
31	5	"Johnny Test: Monster Starter"	Lazar Saric	Willy Ashworth	November 3, 2007	031	305B	1.5/6
31	5	"Johnny Holiday"	Scott Fellows	Kevin Currie	November 3, 2007	031	305A	1.5/6
Mr. Black and Mr. White ask Susan and Mary to design a new weapon, so they make a helmet that allows the user to control things with their mind. But it becomes a huge mistake when it's stuck on Johnny's head, and his obsession with a new video game now makes any inanimate object he sees turn into a monster. Johnny is upset because the holidays that give free candy to the world are spread too far apart, so Johnny decides to start his own holiday, known as Kids Get Free Candy Day, and try to spread free candy. When adults protest against the holiday, Johnny, Dukey, Susan, and Mary gain an unlikely ally against this – the Beekeeper.
32	6	"Coming to a Johnny Near You"	Ron Holsey	Kervin Faria	November 10, 2007	032	306	1.1/4
32	6	"When Johnny Comes Marching Home"	Scott Fellows	Dave Pemberton	November 10, 2007	032	306	1.1/4
Johnny is excited for a new movie, but it is extremely terrible. When Dukey explains how narration makes everything seem better, Johnny convinces Susan and Mary to make a reality warping megaphone, but it malfunctions, and now Johnny is being chased by ninjas who want to kidnap him, a rogue cop and toddlers. Johnny buys a video game which turns out to be a military plot to recruit an elite team of supersoldiers, and then he must join the fight against a group of renegade penguins who are losing their home to global warming.
33	7	"Johnnyitis"	Scott Fellows	Kevin Currie	December 1, 2007	033	307	1.2/5
33	7	"Johnny Mustache"	Keith Wagner	Kervin Faria	December 1, 2007	033	307	1.2/5
Johnny drinks an unstable isotope so he can get sick and not have to study for a test for school. Unfortunately, not only does the isotope give him red spots and a purple tongue, if it's not cured within four hours, it's going to give him immense bloating, cause violent coughing, and eventually make him explode. Johnny has his sisters use an invention that will give him a mustache so that Johnny can get into a movie meant for older people. But when Bling-Bling Boy pesters Johnny to use the invention on him, Johnny shoots the invention at him too much and now Eugene looks like a monster from the movie.
34	8	"Johnny Fu"	Mark Fellows	Naeim Khavari	December 15, 2007	034	308	1.4/6
34	8	"Johnny Escape from Bling-Bling Island"	Scott Fellows	Kevin Currie	December 15, 2007	034	308	1.4/6
Bumper starts taking kung fu and over the school, Johnny seeks Dukey's kung fu advice, but to no avail. Bling-Bling Boy steals Susan and Mary's shoes, and it is up to Johnny and a reluctant Dukey to retrieve them before their dinner with Gil.
35	9	"Johnny's Monkey Business"	Lazar Saric	Kervin Faria	January 26, 2008	035	309	0.9/4
35	9	"Johnny Bench"	Scott Fellows	Satjit Matharu	January 26, 2008	035	309	0.9/4
Susan and Mary need to get Lolo away from Johnny and Dukey for various tests when they try to make a profit out of her in order to get a GameDroid QS. Johnny wants to take an easy class, and he takes woodshop, but the teacher gets hurt and the substitute is Mr. Teacherman. Now he must make a bench or else he goes to summer school.
36	10	"Johnny Long Legs"	Spencer Walker	Kevin Currie	February 2, 2008	036	310	1.3/5
36	10	"Johnny Test in Outer Space"	Scott Fellows	Kervin Faria	February 2, 2008	036	310	1.3/5
Johnny does a spider DNA experiment for his sisters but when Hugh orders Johnny to be normal, Susan accidentally increases the DNA and he becomes a human-spider hybrid. Now Dukey must save Johnny from the hands of Bumper and his pet lizard. While trying to find life on other planets, Johnny meets a leader from the planet Vegandon who attempts to destroy the Earth by sucking out its natural resources.
37	11	"Johnny Cart Racing"	Scott Fellows	Dave Pemberton	February 16, 2008	037	311	1.4/6
37	11	"Johnny Smells Good"	Peter Johansen	Kevin Currie	February 16, 2008	037	311	1.4/6
All Johnny and Dukey want is a simple bike race between the two of them, but everyone ends up joining. Johnny and Dukey test a perfume experiment and now everyone is attracted to them. They use this to their advantage, but it goes out of control. An asteroid is attracted to the smell and heads to crush Johnny and drain his life.
38	12	"Return of Johnny'mon"	Scott Fellows	Kervin Faria	February 23, 2008	038	312	1.1/4
38	12	"Johnny Dukey Doo"	Mark Fellows	Dave Pemberton	February 23, 2008	038	312	1.1/4
Seeking revenge, Blast Ketchup sucks Hugh into the Tiny'Mon world, trying to suck Johnny in. Thinking he is one of Johnny's Tiny'Mon, he captures him. Johnny, Dukey, Susan, and Mary must stop him. To re-exit the game, they must win another battle with Blast. Note: This episode serves as a sequel to Johnny'mon. When a condemned hotel gets haunted by ghosts, Susan and Mary drag Johnny, Dukey, and Gil into the house to prove that the ghosts are fake.
39	13	"Johnny X: A New Beginning"	Scott Fellows	Kevin Currie	March 1, 2008	039	313	0.9/4
39	13	"Johnny X: The Final Ending"	Scott Fellows	Kervin Faria	March 1, 2008	039	313	0.9/4
It's time for the Earth Day Carnival, and the Johnny Stopping Evil Force 5 (with Zizrar replacing the Beekeeper) returns and manages to obtain the same mutant powers as Johnny X and Super Dukey. Meanwhile, Dark Vegan returns to conquer Earth. The story is to be continued in "Johnny X: The Final Ending". Following the events right after "Johnny X: A New Beginning," Dark Vegan returns to destroy the Earth with an upgraded armada. Dark Vegan, with his upgraded armada, is cutting up the Earth's trees and plants (which will remove the oxygen) and sucking up the Earth's water which kills the trees.
