= 100 Things to Do Before High School =

American television sitcom

- Genre: Comedy
- Created by: Scott Fellows
- Starring: Isabela Moner; Jaheem King Toombs; Owen Joyner; Jack De Sena
- Theme music composer: Desmond Child; Andreas Carlsson; Scott Fellows
- Opening theme: "Brand New Day" by Isabela Moner
- Ending theme: "Brand New Day" (instrumental)
- Composer: Guy Moon
- Country of origin: United States
- Original language: English
- No. of seasons: 1
- No. of episodes: 25

Production
- Executive producer: Scott Fellows
- Producer: Steve Burgess
- Editor: Jeff Wright
- Camera setup: Single-camera
- Running time: 22 minutes
- Production companies: Jack Mackie Pictures; Nickelodeon Productions

Original release
- Network: Nickelodeon
- Release: November 11, 2014 – February 27, 2016

100 Things to Do Before High School is an American comedy television series created by Scott Fellows that aired on Nickelodeon from November 11, 2014 to February 27, 2016. The series stars Isabela Moner, Jaheem King Toombs, Owen Joyner, and Jack De Sena.

== Premise ==
Three childhood best friends set off on a quest to make the best out of their final two years of middle school by making a list of 100 things to achieve before they set off to high school. Along with the list and help from their guidance counselor, they make it through the highs and the lows of middle school.

== Cast and characters ==
=== Main ===
- Isabela Moner as CJ Martin, an optimistic 12-year-old who believed that high school would be the best years of her and her best friends' lives until her brother tells her the truth: she will lose all of her friends before high school due to them liking different things. To prevent this from happening, she creates a bucket list filled with things to accomplish before high school.
- Jaheem King Toombs as Fenwick Frazier, a seventh grader who became CJ's first friend in kindergarten. He tends to be reluctant to CJ's ideas, however, he is loyal, and is prone to adventure.
- Owen Joyner as Christian "Crispo" Powers, a 12-year-old boy who vowed to be CJ's best friend after she saved him from choking on his stuffed horse in kindergarten. In sixth grade, he had a bad haircut and braces, but got them off prior to the events of the series' first episode. He became the coolest boy in the whole school, causing the most popular girl in the school to constantly try to get his affections, which becomes a running gag in the series. Nevertheless, he is also loyal, and while he does not have much common sense, his heart is in the right place, and he just wants to have fun with his two best friends as much as he can.
- Jack De Sena as Jack Roberts, the school's guidance counselor, who often helps the three with their list and gives them advice. He often finds loopholes to help CJ.

=== Recurring ===
- Max Ehrich as Ronbie Martin, CJ's older brother, who is in high school. He told her the truth about high school and is usually seen studying.
- Stephanie Escajeda as Mrs. Martin, CJ and Ronbie's mother.
- Henry Dittman as Mr. Martin, CJ and Ronbie's father.
- Lisa Arch as Principal Hader, the school's new principal, who was hired prior to the first episode's events.
- Brady Reiter as Mindy Minus, the most popular girl in school, who is in the same grade as CJ, Fenwick, and Crispo. She often schemes to get Crispo to be her boyfriend, but often fails. She is considered to be mean, spoiled, snobby, and possessive.
- Christopher Neiman as Henry Slinko, the school's science teacher.

== Production ==
The series first aired November 11, 2014, with an hour-long pilot. The series began its regular schedule on June 6, 2015, with the third episode, after the second episode aired on May 30, 2015, as a "sneak preview". On September 11, 2016, actress Lisa Arch stated on Twitter that the series was canceled by Nickelodeon.

== Episodes ==
=== Series overview ===
Season	Episodes	Originally released	
Season	Episodes	First released	Last released
Special		November 11, 2014	
1	24	May 30, 2015	February 27, 2016

=== Special (2014) ===
Title	Directed by	Written by	Original release date	Prod. code	U.S. viewers (millions)
"Special" "Pilot"	Jonathan Judge	Scott Fellows	November 11, 2014	101–102	2.25
Guest stars: Max Ehrich (Ronbie Martin), Stephanie Escajeda (Mrs. Martin), Henry Dittman (Mr. Martin), Lisa Arch (Principal Hader), Diane Delano (Coach LeBeau), Brady Reiter (Mindy Minus), Christopher Neiman (Henry Slinko) Song featured: "The First Day of School"

=== Season 1 (2015–16) ===
No.	Title	Directed by	Written by	Original release date	Prod. code	U.S. viewers (millions)
1	"Start a Garage Band Thing!"	Carlos Gonzalez	Julie Brown	May 30, 2015	105	1.22
Guest stars: Max Ehrich, Henry Dittman, Stephanie Escajeda, Marcus Folmar (Mr. Bandt), Brady Reiter Song featured: "Rock Out Forever"
2	"Run with the Bears Thing!"	Savage Steve Holland	Keith Wagner	June 6, 2015	106	0.96
Guest stars: Max Ehrich, Henry Dittman, Stephanie Escajeda
3	"Say Yes to Everything for a Day Thing!"	Savage Steve Holland	Nathan Knetchel	June 13, 2015	104	1.13
Guest stars: Brady Reiter, Diane Delano
4	"Be a Fairy Godmother Thing!"	Savage Steve Holland	Mark Fellows	June 20, 2015	107	1.41
Guest stars: Max Ehrich, Dahlia White (Scout McKluski)
5	"Stay Up All Night Thing!"	Jonathan Judge	Lazar Saric	June 27, 2015	108	2.00
CJ, Fenwick and Crispo win a sleepover at Pootatuck, along with several other students. Despite previous failed attempts, the three are determined to stay awake all night and witness the sunrise, but Principal Hader tries everything she can to make them go to sleep, so that she will not have to deal with the children. Meanwhile, CJ's parents unsuccessfully try to break into the school to give CJ her retainer, despite the fact that the school's doors will not open until the next morning. Her brother manages to break in on the emergency door and give them things to stay awake. In the last moment, Hader catches CJ and her friends, but they manage to see the sunrise and then immediately drop to the floor and fall asleep. Guest stars: Max Ehrich, Henry Dittman, Stephanie Escajeda, Lisa Arch, Brady Reiter, Dahlia White
6	"Adopt a Flour Baby Thing!"	Savage Steve Holland	Scott Fellows	July 11, 2015	109	1.17
CJ wants a pet guinea pig, but her mom thinks she is not responsible enough, since she could not keep any of her pet fish alive for more than two weeks. To prove to her mom that she is responsible, she agrees to adopt a "flour baby", which is just a bag of flour (Crispo also gets one and Fenwick gets a bag of chips, since he is allergic to wheat). This becomes the next thing on their list. Things start out okay, but eventually it spirals out of control. CJ loses her flour baby and she enlists Fenwick and Crispo's help to help her look for it. Mindy volunteers to help Crispo take care of his flour baby and he eventually agrees, since he wants to beat Fenwick. Crispo and Mindy act like parents, even going so far as to have a custody agreement over the "baby", but they argue regularly. The vending machine in the teacher's lounge is out of a certain type of chips and Fenwick happens to have a bag of them (his "flour baby"). The teachers hunt him down and try to get him to give them the bag. Guest stars: Max Ehrich, Henry Dittman, Stephanie Escajeda, Diane Delano, Marcus Folmar, Brady Reiter
7	"Change Your Look and See What Happens Thing!"	Melissa Kosar	Katie Mattila	July 18, 2015	110	1.23
CJ and her friends decide to change their looks to see what happens. Crispo wears all red, which becomes a problem when a fire chief is looking for him after he burned down the earth day tree. Fenwick wears a muscle suit that lands him a spot on the wrestling team, a position he is not prepared for. And CJ wears a "power suit". The suit gets her a position in which she works with the principal and tries to find out who keeps vandalizing the school's posters. Guest stars: Lisa Arch, Diane Delano, Brady Reiter
8	"Find Your Super Power Thing!"	Jonathan Judge	Scott Fellows	July 25, 2015	103	1.30
Guest stars: Max Ehrich, Henry Dittman, Stephanie Escajeda, Lisa Arch, Brady Reiter, Diane Delano, Christopher Neiman
9	"Scavenger Hunt Thing!"	Jonathan Judge	Julie Brown	September 19, 2015	111	1.46
Guest stars: Lisa Arch, Marcus Folmar, Brady Reiter
10	"Make a New Friend Thing!"	Savage Steve Holland	Nathan Knetchel	September 26, 2015	112	1.41
Guest star: Brady Reiter
11	"Be a Mad Scientist Thing!"	Julian Petrillo	Keith Wagner	October 3, 2015	113	1.28
The group decides to enter the science fair, but CJ cannot figure out what she wants to do and starts losing her spirit; however, Ronbie raises her spirits back up with a pep talk. Meanwhile, Fenwick builds a robot that is beaten by Mindy's better robot. Crispo tries multiple things to impress one of the judges, but repeatedly fails. Eventually, CJ figures out that she can enter her list of 100 things to do before high school because of the science of whether or not things on the list prepare someone for high school and Fenwick builds a robot that highly surpasses Mindy's, but it goes haywire and wrecks everyone's science fair projects, except Crispo's, whose science fair project ended up being himself because of what his body can do. Back at home, CJ notices the trophies that she got from her brother, such as "Greatest CJ Martin Ever" and "Outstanding Achievement in Sisterhood". Guest stars: Max Ehrich, Henry Dittman, Stephanie Escajeda, Christopher Neiman, Brady Reiter
12	"Join a Club Thing!"	Jonathan Judge	Mark Fellows	October 10, 2015	115	1.20
When Crispo joins the Save the Baboons club, which is run by Mindy and Blake, CJ and Fenwick, who were not allowed to join, try to find their own clubs. Fenwick joins the Super Genius club and CJ joins the Club club, which is boring. CJ and the other club members attempt to make it cooler, but it gets taken over by Mindy and Blake's club, so CJ tries one more time in a bigger room. When Crispo discovers that the money donations for the Save the Baboons club is going toward the club's expenses rather than saving the baboons, he leaves and join CJ's Club Awesome club, which becomes a huge success. However, it becomes too much of a success after Mindy's not able to go in, despite everyone being able to join, and CJ, Fenwick, and Crispo not even being allowed to go back in due to the club reaching capacity. Guest stars: Brady Reiter, Nicolas Suter (Eugene Finklestein)
13	"Have the Best Halloween Ever Thing!"	Julian Petrillo	Lazar Saric & Keith Wagner	October 24, 2015	125	1.37
Due to a bad childhood experience, Principal Hader cancels the Halloween carnival. CJ, Fenwick, and Crispo make it their thing to figure out why Principal Hader hates Halloween and fix it. Meanwhile, Crispo is made fun of for wearing what others perceive as a costume for little children. He then changes to a more dark costume to be cool, but later realizes that he should not change simply because somebody does not like a particular feature about him. Later, CJ learns that when Principal Hader was younger, she wanted to be an alien for Halloween; however, her mother forgot her costume and her father made a quick costume by making holes in a pillowcase, causing her to be laughed at. CJ, with help from Mr. Roberts and other staff, makes a costume for Principal Hader, which she is extremely grateful for; as a thanks, she calls the Halloween carnival back on. Guest stars: Lisa Arch, Marcus Folmar, Brady Reiter
14	"Get the Most Out of a Sick Day Thing!"	Savage Steve Holland	Scott Fellows	November 7, 2015	117	1.29
CJ, Fenwick, and Crispo are all sick; CJ and Fenwick are both home while Crispo wants to know what it's like to have a sick day, but his parents do not ever allow him to stay home, no matter how sick he is. Meanwhile, to keep his perfect attendance record, Fenwick has Crispo walk around with Fenwick on an iPad. Later, Fenwick gives Crispo the idea to get on a bike and go over to CJ's house to make the best of his sick day, but when Crispo gets over there, CJ's not there because she came back to school since she was feeling a lot better thanks to some disgusting green liquid medicine her parents forced her to take earlier. Then Crispo is almost caught when CJ's mom stops by to check on CJ because an appointment was canceled. Since Crispo was already on the phone with CJ, he puts it on speaker and he and CJ manage to fool CJ's mom. Meanwhile, Fenwick's iPad battery is dying and CJ must get him to his last class in order for his perfect attendance to stay. Elsewhere, Crispo discovers on the school website that the bike he borrowed is a police bike, which is thought to have been stolen. Then CJ gets a text from her mother that she is coming back early and she must run back home or else she and her father will be in big trouble. In the end, Crispo gets the bike back without being noticed and CJ makes it back home in time, but due to all the running, she gets a fever and is home sick for four days. Guest stars: Stephanie Escajeda, Henry Dittman, Christopher Neiman
15	"Sit at a Different Lunch Table Thing!"	Savage Steve Holland	Lazar Saric	November 14, 2015	116	1.01
When CJ, Fenwick, and Crispo's current lunch table begins to fall apart, they all locate a different table to sit at. CJ joins Mindy's table and subsequently aids Mindy in finding her mom's ring that she lost, Fenwick pretends to be an eight grader in order to enjoy the eight grade patio, and Crispo joins the Swords and Stones table. While CJ and Mindy are retracing Mindy's steps to look for the ring, Mindy remembers that she took it off to wash her in hands in the bathroom. Unfortunately, Principal Hader finds the ring and refuses to return it unless Mindy can prove that it's hers. Meanwhile, Crispo's table accidentally launches food that hits the goths who, in retaliation, declare war. Elsewhere, Mr. Roberts helps Fenwick when his cover is almost blown that he is a seventh grader, but because Fenwick is caught up in all the glory of the eight grade patio, after Mr. Roberts attempts to help him a second time, warning him that if the eighth-graders discover that he is a seventh grader his pants will be taken and hung on the Tree of Pants, he refuses to help him with any future situations. Later, CJ schemes up a plan to get Mindy's ring back, which turns out to be successful and Crispo, who is starving, stops the war and makes peace. Unfortunately for Fenwick, the eighth-graders discover that he is a seventh-grader; however, rather than be humiliated, Fenwick just gives them his pants. Guest stars: Lisa Arch, Brady Reiter
16	"Survive the Virus Attack Trapped in the Last Home Base Station on Earth Thing!"	Jonathan Judge	Mark Fellows	November 21, 2015	121	1.29
CJ's parents are trapped in highway traffic, Fenwick's parents are trapped at the airport, and Crispo's parents are trapped working late. CJ takes advantage of this dilemma and pretends that she, Fenwick, and Crispo are all trapped on Home Base Station 12, where they have a high chance of being infected with an alien virus. Crispo's brother, Flick, infected with the virus, then shows up, demanding to borrow Crispo's jacket in order to impress girls, but he is denied unless he can say please and is also denied entry to the home base station. Later, CJ, Fenwick, and Crispo are infected with the virus and must create an antidote—a sandwich—and wash their clothes using the virus eradication machine. However, it goes wrong when virus eradication machine goes off balance and the antidote starts burning inside the antidote maker. The power then goes out and Flick continues trying to get in. Fenwick then manages to fix the virus eradication machine while CJ shortly after turns the antidote maker down to medium. Flick manages to get inside after using a ladder to crawl in through CJ's open bedroom window. However, the power is shut off and Flick then steps on soup cans on a step on the stairs and falls down. He finally gives in and says please to Crispo and is also given the antidote in order to neutralize the virus. CJ, Fenwick, and Crispo must then clean up the house from all the messes they made before CJ's parents get home, which they manage to successfully do. Guest stars: Stephanie Escajeda, Henry Dittman, Garrett Clayton (Stephen "Flick" Powers), Marcus Folmar
17	"Run for Office Thing!"	Savage Steve Holland	Keith Wagner	January 9, 2016	119	1.23
When Blake and his administration are forced to resign after attacking Crispo in a bear costume, CJ, Fenwick, Crispo all run for office. CJ wants to get everyone to have an extra minute with classes and makes a poster. However, while Fenwick and Crispo like the idea, they want their name to be on it instead, so CJ, Fenwick, and Crispo all run for office separately. Mindy and her crew join Crispo's campaign, but Mindy then ends up controlling Crispo's campaign, making Crispo run for office like she would. Later, CJ's mom wants to go negative, but CJ insists on being nice. CJ and her mom bake cookies for the next day so CJ's voice is heard. Unfortunately, this inspires Fenwick to make a negative advertisement commercial about CJ. Eventually, they all end up making multiple negative advertisement commercials about each other before Mr. Roberts intervenes and requests that they stop. They all reluctantly agree to stop, but then Fenwick and Crispo begin arguing the next day during the presidential debate. CJ interrupts to speak out before dropping out of the race in support of Fenwick and Crispo. However, Fenwick and Crispo then do the same, but then all three begin yelling at the audience, talking bad about themselves. Leaving the audience confused, they end up voting for Paul, a student hall monitor. The students at the school end up getting their extra minute, but CJ, Fenwick, and Crispo then realize how long a minute actually is, so they just decide to go to their next class early. Guest stars: Stephanie Escajeda, Henry Dittman, Brady Reiter
18	"Always Tell the Truth (But Not Always) Thing!"	Joe Menendez	Lazar Saric	January 16, 2016	124	1.29
After CJ, Fenwick, and Crispo discover they always lie, they make a vow to always tell the truth. However, when CJ wants to transfer from ceramics class into drama class because of a cute boy, she makes up an emergency lie ticket, in which one lie will be able to be told without consequences. CJ makes up a lie that her grandmother is dying and it's important that she sees CJ perform in a play one last time. Fenwick later uses an emergency lie when he is asked if he made the pot he is holding after having bad luck trying to make his own. Meanwhile, Crispo becomes brutally honest in cooking class when asked to judge the taste of people's cookies. He is later sent to Mr. Robert's office, who tells him there is a time to tell the truth and there is a time not to and that telling a small white lie is okay every now and then. As CJ is rehearsing, she discovers that the cute boy will be her Romeo; however, the boy then reveals that he would rather be in ceramics class. Later, Fenwick confesses that he lied and then works with the cute boy CJ likes who is good at making pottery. CJ is still keeping up her lie, but later is about to confess when her parents come to the rescue. However, she later realizes that being honest is always important. Guest stars: Stephanie Escajeda, Henry Dittman, Marcus Folmar, Julie Brown (Miss Claymore), Brady Reiter
19	"Become a Millionaire and Give It All Away Thing!"	Savage Steve Holland	Sona Panos	January 23, 2016	122	1.32
When CJ's pootabucks go missing from her super secret hiding place—a 30-year-old unused payphone—she was saving up to go Sir Soaky's Typhoon Splash City Water Park Lagoon, she and her friends must find a way to recover the pootabucks they lost. CJ, Fenwick, and Crispo rush to Mr. Robert's to see if he can help if and he tells them of the legendary treasure chest that belongs to Alfred McSorely and contains one million pootabucks. Principal Hader then interrupts and insists that Mr. Roberts not tell anybody about the treasure chest. Fenwick and Crispo are bent on finding it, but CJ has other plans to try and recover 5,000 pootabucks because she does not believe in the legend. Shortly after, CJ runs into Mindy and her group in the hall and discovers she is the one who stole the pootabucks because she was jealous that she could not go to the water park. CJ takes the pootabucks box back, but discovers that Mindy used 100 pootabucks and paid their science teacher 50 bucks to have class outside since the air conditioning is broken. CJ begs people and performs various tasks around for more pootabucks, which she is able to obtain. However, she makes a fatal mistake when she hides the pootabucks in another super secret location—the air duct in the science room where the air conditioning is not working. Not too long after, while having science class outside, a janitor announcements that the air conditioning is fixed and pootabucks start raining from the top of the school. CJ then joins Fenwick and Crispo's search for the treasure chest when they learn there is a clue in Mr. Robert's office. Mr. Roberts gets involved and helps them, but Principal Hader shows up and steals the pootabuck from CJ's hand. However, CJ then realizes that the treasure chest is actually in another spot. CJ, her friends, and Mr. Roberts find the treasure and CJ decides the nice thing to do would be to take everyone to the water park. Guest stars: Lisa Arch, Christopher Neiman, Brady Reiter
20	"Leave Your Mark Thing!"	Julian Petrillo	Lazar Saric	January 30, 2016	118	1.57
The trio look for ways that they will be remembered by the school long after they have moved on. CJ enlists help to save the Gum Wall, an outdoor area where students stick their chewing gum after making a wish, that has been targeted for destruction by Mr. Slinko. Fenwick plans to improve a faulty water fountain known to douse its users. Crispo tries to find a way to get his name on a school plaque; his lack of success attracts other seekers who name themselves the "Shiny Plaque Pack", and Crispo discovers that everyone has an ability that makes them special. Fenwick's efforts destroy the fountain, and the school board replaces it with a properly-working one that is named after him. CJ's efforts transform the wall into a message board where students can ask for help or trade items. Guest stars: Stephanie Escajeda, Henry Dittman, Max Ehrich, Christopher Neiman, Diane Delano
21	"Meet Your Idol Thing!"	Melissa Kosar	Scott Fellows	February 6, 2016	123	1.46
When CJ, Fenwick, and Crispo cannot figure out what their thing is going to be, Mr. Roberts suggests that meeting their idols should be their thing. and they take him up on his suggestion. Crispo wants to meet Olympic snowboarding superstar Louie Vito, Fenwick wants to meet astrophysicist Neil deGrasse Tyson, and CJ wants to meet international pop star Anthony Del Rey. Fenwick asks Mr. Roberts for his help who at first refuses, but then agrees to help him. Mr. Roberts suggests requesting a call or writing a letter, but Fenwick wants to use a shady website that will provide Neil deGrasse Tyson's phone number for $19.95, but Mr. Roberts insists the Fenwick be patient. When Fenwick asks Mr. Roberts how long it took him to wait when he wrote a letter to Neil deGrasse Tyson, he says that it took nine months, and Fenwick freaks out. Meanwhile, Crispo discovers that whoever makes the best commercial for Little Tiny Waffles, Louie Vito will star in the winner's commercial alongside them. Meanwhile, CJ reluctantly becomes a Mindette in order to get a concert ticket to see Anthony Del Rey. Mindy performs a series a tests to see if CJ is a true Mindette, which CJ is prepared for. Later, Crispo is with Fenwick who ended up falling for the shady website's scam and gets the Dominican Republic instead. CJ then passes by with Mindy, leaving Fenwick and Crispo in shock. Meanwhile, when Mindy keeps asking her dad for a bigger limousine, he denies her the tickets after he says she is too demanding. Later, CJ and her mom come up with a plan to meet Anthony Del Rey to stand by the buses when he is leaving the concert. Meanwhile, Crispo is down when his commercial keeps receiving negative comments and wants to make a new commercial. Later, Fenwick hacks Neil deGrasse Tyson's laptop's webcam, but quickly closes Mr. Roberts' laptop when Neil deGrasse Tyson freaks out. Later, CJ runs into Mindy and discovers she stole her dad's wallet to bribe her and CJ's way into the concert. However, instead of participating in that, CJ invites Mindy to come with her and her mom. Later, Fenwick discovers Mr. Roberts is being arrested after Neil deGrasse Tyson called in to report the earlier hack. Crispo walks in and says Little Tiny Waffles rejected his new commercial for being too violent. Just then Neil deGrasse Tyson finally calls, and Fenwick asks for advice on Crispo's behalf on making a good commercial. Crispo then asks Neil deGrasse Tyson if he will help, which he agrees to. Later, CJ, Mindy, and CJ's mom are at the concert waiting to meet Anthony Del Rey when Mindy becomes fan-crazed and tries to get a lock of Anthony Del Rey's hair. As he is retreating, he falls and breaks his foot. By luck, CJ's dad happened to be his doctor and asked if he could come by and sing a song for CJ. CJ and her mom are surprised to see Anthony Del Rey on the couch when they get home. He then sings her a song, which really impresses her. Later, CJ, Fenwick, Louie Vito, and Neil deGrasse Tyson all help Crispo by participating in another new commercial, which turns out to be a success. Guest star: Neil deGrasse Tyson, Louie Vito, Anthony De La Torre (Anthony Del Rey), Brady Reiter Song featured: "Fade in a Day" performed by Anthony De La Torre as Anthony Del Rey
22	"Master a Thing Thing!"	Stewart Schill	Nathan Knetchel	February 13, 2016	120	1.06
CJ, Fenwick, and Crispo all want to master a thing: CJ does not know what she wants to master and Crispo wants to master "Jingle Bells" on the violin. Fenwick already believes he has mastered a thing—receiving straight As. However, that changes when he receives a B on a Shakespeare assignment and shows that he is the master of tantrums. The teacher calls Mr. Roberts who is all too familiar with Fenwick's tantrums and leads him into his office. Mr. Roberts notices that Fenwick has been a little stressed and asks him about it. After he explains his issues, Mr. Roberts shows Fenwick a pamphlet with relaxation techniques. Meanwhile, CJ ropes her parents into helping her. She discovers there is a kung fu class at the community center and decides to give it a try. When she arrives she notices that Gorgeous Eighth Grade Boy is in the orange division, and that is when she decides that kung fu will be her thing to master. Later, Crispo is having no luck mastering "Jingle Bells" on the violin and gives up. Meanwhile, CJ masters kung fu and makes it into the orange belt division. However, things take a bad turn when she has to fight Gorgeous Eighth Grade Boy. Later, Crispo discovers Tammi Viola, a master violinist, saved his violin from the garbage. She then suggests him to get the rhythm down first. Later, Fenwick is taken into Mr. Roberts' office again, who suggests another relaxation technique. It fails again, but Mr. Roberts discovers that rather than playing dodge ball, he has just been standing there, so he suggests actually participating. Later, after Crispo has given up again, Tammi once again gets his spirits back up by having him listen to what he sounds like among an orchestra. Later during gym, Fenwick discovers that actually participating in sports does reduce stress. Later, after CJ has already discovered that Gorgeous Eighth Grade Boy is terrible at kung fu, she defeats him multiple times. He later comes and CJ sees him with a broken arm, and he asks her to sign his cast. CJ thinks it is her fault, but he says that he actually broke it in a skateboarding accident. Guest stars: Stephanie Escajeda, Henry Dittman, Diane Delano, Alex Hooper (Dojo Dave)
23	"Raise Your Hand Thing!"	Jonathan Judge	Scott Fellows	February 20, 2016	126	1.36
When Crispo receives another bad grade on an assignment, CJ and Fenwick discover it is due to the fact that he refuses to raise his hand out of fear that people will look at him like he's not smart. CJ then makes raising their hand their thing for the day, and Fenwick takes it upon himself to help Crispo. Later, CJ offers to be the tour guide of elementary school students who will be in middle school next year and is looking forward to answering their questions. However, it becomes a challenge when they run away from her and cause trouble. She manages to trap them in the bench of shame room before she loses them again. Mr. Roberts later informs CJ that they ran back to their elementary school and complaint about how CJ was the worst tour guide ever. Meanwhile, Crispo is working on raising his hand in class, finally managing to do it a few times; however, rather than ask for help on the material, he simply asks to use the restroom, breaking his arm the second time he uses that excuse. Meanwhile, Fenwick is a little jealous when Crispo can just raise his hand in the hallway and get a triple high-five from girls. Later, CJ gives touring another shot, but is locked in the lockers by the elementary school students. Fenwick and Crispo come to her rescue after she had called them and the three come up with a plan to catch them. Later, Crispo finally works up the courage to ask an actual question about the material, causing everyone else to raise their hands as well when the teacher notices Crispo's bravery and mentions that answering questions is part of his job. The teacher postpones the quiz that was planned to go over the lesson again. Later, CJ, Fenwick, and Crispo chase and manage to trap the elementary school students in the bench of shame room again, where they admit to CJ that they locked her in the locker out of fear that she was going to do it to them instead and that they are nervous about the middle school experience in general. CJ, Fenwick, and Crispo then give them an official tour of the school and answer their questions. When the tour's over, Mr. Roberts comes over to congratulate CJ, Fenwick, and Crispo on a job well done and sends the elementary school students back to their school. As they are leaving, they each give Fenwick a high-five. Guest stars: Stephanie Escajeda, Henry Dittman, Christopher Neiman, Brady Reiter
24	"Get Your Heart Pre-Broken Thing!"	Savage Steve Holland	Scott Fellows	February 27, 2016	114	1.17
After seeing Ronbie taking his first breakup pretty hard, CJ, Fenwick, and Crispo make it their thing to get their hearts pre-broken in order to survive actual breakups. The plan is to find someone they crush on, ask them out on a smoothie date, and then experience their hearts being broken when they say no. Later, Mr. Roberts is not in the mood to deal with their thing due to parent–teacher conferences. Meanwhile, Crispo asks a girl out on a date in hopes that she will say no, but when she says yes and he then changes his mind, she becomes heartbroken. Fenwick asks Amy, a popular eighth grade girl, out on a date, but she says no because she prefers football players and leaves Fenwick heartbroken. CJ then asks Gorgeous Eighth Grade Boy out on a date and is prepared for the worst, but when he says yes, she is left in shock. Later, after some cheering up from Mr. Roberts, Fenwick attempts to ask Amy out again by bad-mouthing her current boyfriend. She agrees, leaving Fenwick a little surprised. Meanwhile, Crispo attempts to ask another girl out in hopes that she will say no, but when she does not, he also makes her cry and is then chased by a mob of angry girls when he reveals he did not want to go out with any of them, forcing him into Mr. Roberts' office. He then gets the bright idea to make CJ his crush and follows her around all over the place. Amy's boyfriend, Dale, finds Fenwick and chases him. Meanwhile, Crispo gets CJ to say no to a smoothie, but it does not hurt him, so continues trying. Dale finds Fenwick and Fenwick discovers that he is heartbroken and just wants Amy back. CJ begins to realize that she and Gorgeous Eighth Grade Boy have nothing in common, especially after he makes her carry his books. Fenwick tries to help Dale win Amy back, when the plan backfires, Dale chases him into Mr. Roberts' office. Later, Crispo reads a poem to a CJ which actually impresses her. Gorgeous Eight Grade Boy's poem, not so much. Fenwick attempts to help Dale again, but when Amy reveals she is going out with someone else, they are both heartbroken and go into Mr. Roberts' office to eat ice-cream, interrupting his meetings yet again. Crispo tries to get his heart broken again, and this time when CJ says no to a smoothie date, he actually feels something that slightly hurts. Crispo then offers to go out with one of the girls he rejected earlier. CJ then gets that same feeling and cancels her date with Gorgeous Eighth Grade Boy. Back at home, Ronbie is back on his feet with a new date and wishes CJ well who is on the couch eating ice-cream. Guest stars: Max Ehrich, Henry Dittman, Stephanie Escajeda

== Broadcast ==
100 Things to Do Before High School premiered on Nickelodeon in Australia and New Zealand on August 29, 2015, and on Nickelodeon in the United Kingdom and Ireland on September 28, 2015. The series premiered on YTV in Canada on October 8, 2015.

== Ratings ==
Viewership and ratings per season of 100 Things to Do Before High School
Season	Episodes	First aired		Last aired		Avg. viewers (millions)
Season	Episodes	Date	Viewers (millions)	Date	Viewers (millions)	Avg. viewers (millions)
1	24	May 30, 2015	1.22	February 27, 2016	1.17	1.30
