= Louis Chirillo =

American actor

- Occupation: Actor
- Years active: 1988–2015

Louis Chirillo is an American former actor. He is famous for voicing Keefe in Zoids: Fuzors. He has also voiced Shaman in Pucca and Dukey on the first through the fourth seasons of Johnny Test.

In 2008, he founded Chirillo Productions, a voice-over company that provides English-dubbed content for Brazilian markets. The company was originally based in Salvador, Bahia, Brazil, but has since relocated to Bellevue, Washington. He has owned the trademark to the Seattle Totems since 2018.

== Filmography ==
=== Film ===
- Finder's Fee (2001) - Male Cop
- Love and Other Dilemmas (2006) - Izzy
- Battle in Seattle (2007) - Individual
- Watchmen (2009) - Face to Face TV Producer

=== Animation ===
- Sitting Ducks (2001–2003, TV Series) – Ed (voice)
- Sabrina: Friends Forever (2002, TV Series) - Salem Saberhagen
- Being Ian (2005–2007, TV Series) – Ken Kelley / Red Nose / Commercial Announcer / Mr. Lipsett / Community Vol #1 / Dodgy Fellow / Bodyguard / Mate #2 / Fan #5 / Bully / Man's Voice / Woodsman / Rutherford / TV Announcer #1 / Commander / Man in Hazmut Suit / Kyle's Dimwitted Girlfriend
- Johnny Test (2005–2011, TV Series) – Dukey / Brain Freezer / Mr. Henry Teacherman (Season 1–4)
- Pucca (2006–2008, TV Series) – Shaman
- Storm Hawks (2007, TV Series) – Rex Guardian Member #1
- GeoTrax (2007, TV Series) – Paul
- Clanners - Captain Memo
- Tom and Jerry Tales (2008, TV Series) – Lion
- Iron Man: Armored Adventures (2009, TV Series) – Living Laser
- Barbie: The Pearl Princess (2014) – Wormwood

=== Anime ===
- Mobile Suit Gundam: Char's Counterattack (1988)
- Zoids: Fuzors (2003, TV Series) – Keefe
- Black Lagoon (2006, TV Series) – Chin
- Transformers: Cybertron (2005, TV Series) – Ransack
- .hack//Roots (2006, TV Series) – Kuhn
- Death Note (2006) – Hitoshi Demegawa
- The Story of Saiunkoku (2006, TV Series) – Reishin Hong
- Powerpuff Girls Z (2006-2007, TV Series) – Professor Utonium
- L: Change the World (2008) - Pedestrian

=== Video games ===
- Devil Kings (2005) – Orwik
- Dynasty Warriors: Gundam (2007) – Heero Yuy
- Dynasty Warriors: Gundam 2 (2008) – Heero Yuy
- Prototype (2009)
