= Johnny Test =

Animated television series

- Genre: Science fantasy; Action-adventure; Animated sitcom
- Created by: Scott Fellows
- Developed by: Aaron Simpson
- Showrunner: Scott Fellows
- Directed by: Chris Savino (season 1); Joseph Sherman (season 2); Larry Jacobs (seasons 3, 5); John Lei (season 6)
- Voices of: James Arnold Taylor; Louis Chirillo; Trevor Devall; Maryke Hendrikse; Brittney Wilson; Ashleigh Ball; Ian James Corlett; Kathleen Barr; Lee Tockar; Andrew Francis; Bill Mondy; Scott McNeil
- Theme music composer: Kevin Manthei & Kevin Riepl (season 1); Ian LeFeuvre (seasons 2–6)
- Opening theme: "Johnny Test Theme", performed by Aaron Molho (season 1) and Ian LeFeuvre (seasons 2–6)
- Ending theme: "Johnny Test Theme" (instrumental)
- Composers: Kevin Manthei (season 1); Ian LeFeuvre & Ari Posner (seasons 2–6)
- Countries of origin: United States; Canada
- Original language: English
- No. of seasons: 6
- No. of episodes: 117 (234 segments) (list of episodes)

Production
- Executive producers: Loris Kramer Lunsford; Sander Schwartz (season 1); Scott Fellows (seasons 2–6); Michael Hirsh (seasons 2–6); Lesley Taylor (season 2); Pamela Slavin (seasons 3–4); Toper Taylor (seasons 4–6); John Vandervelde (seasons 5–6)
- Producers: Scott Fellows (season 1); Chris Savino (season 1); Pamela Slavin (season 2); Jennifer Picherack (season 3); Dave Beatty (season 4); Audrey Velichka (season 5)
- Running time: 20–22 minutes (two 11-minute segments)
- Production companies: Warner Bros. Animation (season 1) (Note: Despite leaving the production of the series after season 1, they received studio credit during season 2.); Cookie Jar Entertainment (Note: Credited as Coliseum Entertainment for season 2. Produced as Johnny Test Productions Inc. (season 2), Johnny Test III Productions Inc. (season 3), Johnny Test IV Productions Inc. (season 4), CJ Johnny Test V Productions Inc. (season 5), and CJ Johnny Test VI Productions Inc. (season 6)) (seasons 2–6); DHX Media (season 6)

Original release
- Network: Kids' WB (U.S.; seasons 1–3); Cartoon Network (U.S.; seasons 4–6); Teletoon (Canada)
- Release: September 17, 2005 – December 25, 2014

Related
- Johnny Test (2021–2022)

Johnny Test is an animated science fantasy sitcom created by Scott Fellows, originally produced in the United States by Warner Bros. Animation and later produced in Canada by Cookie Jar Entertainment and DHX Media. It premiered on Kids' WB on September 17, 2005, and later moved to Cartoon Network in 2008, where it ran until its conclusion on December 25, 2014. In Canada, the series premiered on Teletoon on September 3, 2006.

The series revolves around the adventures of the titular character, Johnny Test, an 11-year-old suburban boy who lives with his parents, his "super-genius" 13-year-old twin sisters, Susan and Mary, and a talking dog named Dukey. They reside in the fictional town of Porkbelly. Johnny is often used as a test subject for his twin sisters' scientific experiments and inventions, which frequently cause chaotic mishaps that he must resolve.

A revival series produced by WildBrain premiered on Netflix in 2021, with Fellows returning as showrunner.

== Premise ==
The series revolves around Johnny Test (full name Jonathan Test), an 11-year-old boy living in the fictional town of Porkbelly with his parents and his 13-year-old twin sisters, Susan and Mary. His mother, Lila, works as a corporate businesswoman, while his father, Hugh, is a stay-at-home parent obsessed with cleanliness and cooking meatloaf. Susan and Mary are genius scientists who frequently use Johnny as a test subject for various experiments and technological inventions in their home laboratory. Many of their inventions are created in attempts to impress their neighbor, Gil, on whom both sisters hold an unrequited crush.

Johnny is a hyperactive and mischievous boy who frequently causes trouble throughout the town. He is accompanied by Dukey, an anthropomorphic talking dog given human intelligence by Susan and Mary. Johnny often misuses his sisters' inventions to avoid schoolwork or personal chores, leading to unintended consequences; however, he regularly resolves these problems or saves the town from external threats.

Recurring characters include Eugene "Bling-Bling Boy" Hamilton, a wealthy technological rival who holds an unrequited crush on Susan; Sissy Blakley, a tomboy who acts as both a rival and love interest for Johnny; Bumper Randalls, the local school bully; and Mr. Black and Mr. White, two government agents who frequently recruit or assist the Test family on secret missions.

== Episodes ==
Season	Segments	Episodes	Originally released		
Season	Segments	Episodes	First released	Last released	Network
1	26	13	September 17, 2005	July 29, 2006	The WB (Kids' WB!) (U.S.)
2	26	13	October 28, 2006	May 12, 2007	The CW (Kids' WB!) (U.S.); Teletoon (Canada)
3	26	13	September 22, 2007	March 1, 2008	The CW (Kids' WB!) (U.S.); Teletoon (Canada)
4	52	26	November 9, 2009	September 12, 2011	Cartoon Network (U.S.); Teletoon (Canada)
5	52	26	June 13, 2011	August 15, 2012	Cartoon Network (U.S.); Teletoon (Canada)
6	52	26	April 23, 2013	December 25, 2014	Cartoon Network (U.S.); Teletoon (Canada)

== Characters ==
- Johnny Test (voiced by James Arnold Taylor)
- Dukey (voiced by Louis Chirillo (seasons 1–4); Trevor Devall (seasons 5–6)
- Susan Test (voiced by Maryke Hendrikse)
- Mary Test (voiced by Brittney Wilson (seasons 1 & 5); Ashleigh Ball (seasons 2–4 & 6)
- Hugh Test (voiced by Ian James Corlett)
- Lila Test (voiced by Kathleen Barr)
- Gil Nexdor (voiced by Andrew Francis)
- Mr. Black (voiced by Bill Mondy)
- Mr. White (voiced by Scott McNeil)

== History ==
=== Origin and development ===
On February 16, 2005, The WB announced Johnny Test as part of its Kids' WB Saturday morning lineup for the 2005–06 television season. The series was officially created and executive produced by Scott Fellows, who based the titular character and his twin sisters on himself and his real-life sisters, Susan and Mary. However, in 2013, a live-action television director filed a lawsuit against the producers, alleging that he was the original creator of the series' concept and was owed creator credit.

The series was developed for television by Aaron Simpson, who produced an initial Flash-animated test pilot before the network ordered a full series. Production design for the first season was provided by Matt Danner and Marc Perry, and later refined by producer Chris Savino and art director Paul Stec. James Arnold Taylor voiced Johnny in the test pilot; although producers initially planned to recast the role with a Canadian voice actor for the series, Taylor was retained to re-dub the first season and remained with the show throughout its run.

=== Production ===
The first season of Johnny Test was produced in-house by Warner Bros. Animation, with animation services outsourced to Studio B Productions in Canada, Top Draw Animation in the Philippines, and Digital eMation in South Korea. Storyboards were contributed by Atomic Cartoons. The original theme song and score were composed by Kevin Manthei, with lyrics written by Fellows. Voice recording was directed by Terry Klassen through Voicebox Productions.

Following the 2006 merger of UPN and The WB into The CW, production of the series underwent budget reductions and was taken over by Canadian company Cookie Jar Entertainment. A new creative crew was hired, and the animation pipeline transitioned to Adobe Flash, handled by Collideascope Digital Productions for seasons two and three.

Although the season three finale was originally intended to serve as the series finale, Cartoon Network picked up the show for a fourth season in 2009, with animation duties shifting to Atomic Cartoons. The show was subsequently renewed for a fifth and sixth season, bringing its total to 117 episodes (234 segments) and celebrating its 100th episode milestone in August 2013. Voice cast changes occurred during later seasons, including Trevor Devall replacing Louis Chirillo as Dukey in season five, and Brittney Wilson temporarily taking over Ashleigh Ball's roles during season five before Ball returned for season six.

== Revivals ==
=== Web shorts ===
In 2019, WildBrain announced that there would be new episodes of Johnny Test coming in 2020, later known as Johnny Test: The Lost Web Series. On May 2, over a year after the announcement, the Johnny Test YouTube channel premiered the first episode, "League of Johnnys", and then deleted it on May 5 for unknown reasons. More episodes would eventually be uploaded on a weekly basis from September 19, to November 7, 2026, 6 years later, with "Johnny Be Ghost". 15 episodes were produced.

=== TV series ===
In May 2020, the show was picked up by Netflix for two additional seasons, along with an interactive special. The series has an updated look, provided by Stephen Silver, and was released on July 16, 2021.

== Release ==
=== Broadcast history ===
Johnny Test premiered in the United States on September 17, 2005, on The WB's Saturday morning block, Kids' WB. In Canada, the series debuted on Teletoon on September 8, 2006. Following the 2006 merger of UPN and The WB into The CW, the network aired the show's second and third seasons. The third season premiered on September 22, 2007, and concluded on March 1, 2008, marking the block's final day of broadcast.

On January 7, 2008, the series made its premiere on Cartoon Network, which broadcast the remainder of the series through its conclusion on December 25, 2014. The show also aired in syndication on Boomerang intermittently between April 2013 and June 2016.

=== Home media ===
In Region 1, NCircle Entertainment initially distributed single-disc compilation DVDs starting in December 2008. In 2011, Mill Creek Entertainment acquired home video licensing rights from DHX Media, releasing season sets for seasons one through five between 2011 and 2015.

In Region 2, Liberation Entertainment released the complete first season on DVD in the United Kingdom on February 21, 2008.

Johnny Test DVD releases
Season	Episodes	Release dates (Region 1)
1	13	February 15, 2011
2	13	February 15, 2011
3	13	September 13, 2011
4	26	September 13, 2011
5	26	May 5, 2015

== Reception ==
=== Critical response ===
Johnny Test has become an internet meme for its sound design, which strongly uses a repetitive bullwhip sound. It has been estimated that a typical episode can have an average of one whipcrack sound effect for every 2.8 seconds

Johnny Test received mixed reviews from television critics and audiences throughout its run.

Joly Herman of Common Sense Media gave the series three out of five stars, describing it as an age-appropriate and "surprisingly inventive" choice for children. Herman noted that while the main character undergoes unsupervised experiments that fuel zany plotlines, the show was noticeably less violent than other cartoons in its genre.

Retrospective commentary on the series has been more mixed. In a 2023 retrospective ranking Canadian animated series for Collider, modern coverage noted that while early seasons were praised for their energy, later seasons faced criticism from fans and animation critics for a perceived drop in animation quality and overused sound effects following the transition to Flash animation.

The show's sound design - particularly its reliance on a generic whipcrack sound effect to punctuate its limited animation - has become a minor internet meme. Twitch streamer YourBudTevin attempted a drinking game using a segment of the series in which a whipcrack sound effect would cue a drink, and passed out at 8 minutes, 3 minutes short of the segment's full length - Carver Fisher of Dexerto calculated that as the segment used, "Johnny’s 100th Episode", contains roughly 230 whipcracks, that would total to an average of one whipcrack for every 2.8 seconds.

=== Awards and nominations ===
In 2006, the first season of the series was nominated for Outstanding Sound Editing - Live Action and Animation at the 33rd Daytime Emmy Awards and a Golden Reel Award for Best Sound Editing in Television Animation (for the episode pair, Deep Sea Johnny and Johnny and the Amazing Turbo Action Backpack) at Motion Picture Sound Editors, USA. In 2007, the second season of the show won a Gemini Award for Best Direction in a Children's or Youth Program or Series (for the episode pair, Saturday Night's Alright for Johnny and Johnny's Mint Chip) and in 2008, the third season was nominated for another Gemini Award, this time for Best Original Music Score for an Animated Program or Series (for the episode pair, Johnny vs. Bling-Bling 3 and Stinkin' Johnny); finally, in 2010, the show, in its fourth season, was nominated once more for yet another Gemini Award, this time wholly for Best Animated Program or Series (for the episode pair, Johnny Cakes and Johnny Tube) and had been awarded a Grand Prize for Best Program - All Categories at the Alliance for Children and Television's 2009 Gala award ceremony, which ultimately marks the series' owner, Cookie Jar's first ACT award.

== In other media ==
=== Toys ===
Cookie Jar partnered with restaurant chain CKE Restaurants to offer a promotional Johnny Test toy campaign at its Carl's Jr. and Hardee's restaurants in the U.S. and Mexico, featuring one of the four custom-designed premiums with the purchase of their Cool Kids Combo meals; the campaign ran from June 28, 2010, through until August 24, 2010, with Carl's Jr. also having subsequently presented a Johnny Test soccer-themed promotion in Mexico, which lasted June 7 – July 25, 2010, to coincide with the country's World Cup activities. Philippines-based fried chicken chain Jollibee advertised a similar toy campaign in their Kids' Meals as well, in the form of their Amazing Adventure Chasers mini-toyline. In 2014, DHX Media signed a master toy license with Imports Dragon.

=== Video games ===
On January 21, 2010, another partnership had emerged between Cookie Jar Entertainment and the mobile application developer Jirbo that resulted in two Johnny Test video games produced by the developer and made available exclusively for download from iTunes, for free and for the iPhone, iPod Touch and iPad. The first game, Johnny Test: Clone Zapper, finds Johnny Test and Dukey engaged to combat an army of Johnny clones they accidentally created from a clone machine, with the help of two special laser zapper guns as their only weapons to defeat the clones and destroy them personally, and the second game, Johnny Test: Bot Drop, sees Johnny, Dukey and the Test twins going on a rescue chase, with Johnny and Dukey both piloting a bot drop plane to use the robot clones of Johnnies (first seen in 101 Johnnies) for the titular "Bot Drops" to eject them to safety in a moving rescue vehicle driven by Susan and Mary. In the plot of that latter aforementioned game, and like in each level of the game before it, Johnny has to aim and time to drop the robots, so they will land safely onto the vehicle, then Johnny Test has saved the day once again. Both games are typical shoot-'em-up and side-scrolling titles that utilize the iPhone, iPod Touch, and iPad's unique multitouch capabilities and scrolling, and, as a whole, players of both games can compete for worldwide high scores list of each level of the game and competitive players. Later in Spring of 2011, the series was finally officially licensed by Cookie Jar for a new third, and fully console-handled video game, this time, however, to come out on Nintendo DS; a sneak preview and trailer of the game had been already included on the complete first and second seasons DVD set and was released on March 29, 2011.

=== Comic books and graphic novels ===
Viper Comics announced in April 2011 that they would be publishing a Johnny Test graphic novel along with another Cookie Jar Group property, Inspector Gadget. The book was subsequently published with the title Johnny Test: The Once and Future Johnny.

=== Amusement park ===
The Granby Zoo in Granby, Quebec also has an amusement park called "Parc Johnny Test Collection."
