= Lazar Saric =

Scottish–American screenwriter

- Occupations: Writer, songwriter, director, producer
- Years active: 1996–present
- Known for: Ned's Declassified School Survival Guide; Johnny Test; Big Time Rush; 100 Things To Do Before High School; Curious George; Killer Drag Queens on Dope

Lazar Saric is a Scottish television writer, songwriter, producer, and director.

== Career ==
He is well known for working on shows that were created by another television producer, Scott Fellows, as a writer, producer, and director on Ned's Declassified School Survival Guide, Johnny Test as a story writer, Big Time Rush as a writer and producer, then moved on to co-executive producer later on in the series. He wrote episodes of 100 Things To Do Before High School and Supernoobs. He also served as a producer, writer, and director in the 2003 film Killer Drag Queens on Dope. He also wrote for Curious George.

== Filmography ==
=== Film ===
Year	Title	Notes
1996	Neon Signs	Writer
2003	Killer Drag Queens on Dope	Writer, producer, & director

=== Television ===
Year	Title	Notes
2004–2007	Ned's Declassified School Survival Guide	Story Editor, Writer, Producer, & director
2005–2012	Johnny Test	Writer & Story
2006	Time Warp Trio	Writer
2006–2014	Curious George	Writer & Songwriter
2008	Back at the Barnyard	Writer
2009–2013	Big Time Rush	Writer, producer, & Co-Executive Producer
2012	SheZow	Writer & Teleplay
2015–2016	100 Things To Do Before High School	Writer
2015–2019	Supernoobs	Writer
2021–2022	Johnny Test	Writer & Story
2022	Interrupting Chicken	Writer
