= List of Big Time Rush episodes =

Big Time Rush is an American television sitcom created by Scott Fellows about the Hollywood misadventures of Kendall, James, Carlos and Logan after they are selected to form a boy band. The series premiered with an hour-long pilot episode, "Big Time Audition", on Nickelodeon, on November 28, 2009. Its official debut episode premiered on January 18, 2010, earning 6.8 million viewers, making it Nickelodeon's highest-rated live-action series debut ever. The final episode aired on July 25, 2013, after four seasons comprising a total of 74 episodes.

== Series overview ==
Season	Episodes	Originally released	
Season	Episodes	First released	Last released
1	20	November 28, 2009	August 20, 2010
2	29	September 25, 2010	January 28, 2012
Film		March 10, 2012	
3	12	May 12, 2012	November 10, 2012
4	13	May 2, 2013	July 25, 2013

== Episodes ==
=== Season 1 (2009–10) ===
No. overall	No. in season	Title	Directed by	Written by	Original release date	Prod. code	US viewers (millions)
1	1	"Big Time Audition"	Savage Steve Holland	Scott Fellows	November 28, 2009	101	3.5
2	2	"Big Time Audition"	Savage Steve Holland	Scott Fellows	November 28, 2009	102	3.5
Four hockey players from Minnesota, Kendall Knight (Kendall Schmidt), James Diamond (James Maslow), Carlos Garcia (Carlos Pena Jr.), and Logan Mitchell (Logan Henderson), learn that record producer Gustavo (Stephen Kramer Glickman) is conducting a talent search, and go to audition. Kendall gets angry at Gustavo for turning James down, and sings "the giant turd song" to him. Gustavo is impressed with Kendall's fiery personality and offers to bring him to Los Angeles, but Kendall will not go without the other three. Gustavo agrees to this, but the record label CEO gives him only three days to turn the boys, who are terrible at dancing, singing, and cooperating, into a successful band. Guest stars: Tanya Chisholm as Kelly Wainwright, Erin Sanders as Camille, Challen Cates as Mrs. Knight, Fred Tallaksen as Mr. X, Rachel Quaintance as Roberta, Michael Ng as Rob, Ted Garcia as himself, Matt Riedy as Griffin, Anne Johnson as Mrs. Magicowski, Denyse Tontz as Jennifer 1, Spencer Locke as Jennifer 2, Savannah Jayde as Jennifer 3, Barnett O'Hara as Guitar Dude, Tucker Albrizzi as Tyler, Alyssa Preston as Tyler's Mom, Obdul Reid as Obdul, Sammy Jay as Jenny Tinkler, and Sway Calloway as himself (uncredited) Special guest star: Nicole Scherzinger as herself Songs featured: "City Is Ours", "Famous", "Big Time Rush" Notes: Curt Hansen played Kendall's role in an unaired version of this episode and recorded "Famous" and "This Is Our Someday", but was replaced by Kendall Schmidt. Hansen later played Dak Zevon in the series.
3	3	"Big Time School of Rocque"	Savage Steve Holland	David Schiff	January 18, 2010	104	6.8
The boys learn that they must still complete schooling while staying in Los Angeles, and are frustrated to learn that Gustavo will not allow them to attend the Palm Woods school, instead forcing them to his own "School of Rocque" at Rocque Records. The boys set out to thwart Gustavo's plans and live their fantasies at the Palm Woods school. Guest Starring: Tanya Chisholm as Kelly Wainwright, Challen Cates as Mrs. Knight, Chris Masters as himself, Dee Bradley Baker as Mr. Smitty, Roz Witt as Mrs. Chisdak, Tara Strong as Ms. Collins, David Anthony Higgins as Mr. Bitters, Ralph Cole, Jr. as Mr. Abramowitz, Maxine Weldon as Laxative Auditioner, Joe Dietl and Jennifer Say Gan as The Audition Holders, Denyse Tontz as Jennifer 1, Spencer Locke as Jennifer 2, Savannah Jayde as Jennifer 3, Tucker Albrizzi as Tyler, Nick Vogels as Elliot and Peggy Flood as Elliot's Mom. Songs featured: "City Is Ours"
4	4	"Big Time Crib"	David Kendall	Scott Fellows	January 22, 2010	103	N/A
The boys are not thrilled with their boring apartment at the Palm Woods, and hatch a plan to improve it when Gustavo creates a fun "fake" living area for them on the soundstage of an Electronic Press Kit shoot. They enlist the help of all their friends at Palm Woods, including Camille and The Jennifers, to move the games and gadgets from the set to their apartment. Songs featured: "Big Time Rush" Guest star(s): Tanya Chisholm as Kelly Wainwright, Challen Cates as Mrs. Knight, Erin Sanders as Camille, Lilli Birdsell as The Set Designer, Matt Riedy as Griffin, David Anthony Higgins as Mr. Bitters, Koji Kataoka as Fujisaki, Denyse Tontz as Jennifer 1, Spencer Locke as Jennifer 2, Savannah Jayde as Jennifer 3, Obdul Reid as Obdul, and Stephanie Lesh-Farrell as Stage Manager
5	5	"Big Time Bad Boy"	Joe Menendez	Lazar Saric	January 29, 2010	105	3.8
Griffin thinks that the band needs a "bad boy" presence to broaden their appeal, and pairs them with "Wayne Wayne", an Eminem parody who tries to inject dissension and tension into the group. Gustavo and the guys join together to get him booted out of the band. After Kendall defeats him in a "bad boy" contest, Wayne Wayne is teamed with a parody version of The Wiggles. Mrs. Knight becomes afraid of the Palm Woods handyman, who she believes is an axe maniac. Katie is suspicious of Molly, a girl whom Mrs. Knight forces Katie to play with. Guest starring: Tanya Chisholm as Kelly Wainwright, Challen Cates as Mrs.Knight, Erin Sanders as Camille, Matt Angel as Wayne Wayne, Matt Riedy as Griffin, Daran Norris as Buddha Bob, Tony Rago and Malcolm Foster Smith as The Police Officers, Ted Garcia as Himself, David Anthony Higgins as Mr. Bitters, Denyse Tontz as Jennifer 1, Spencer Locke as Jennifer 2, Savannah Jayde as Jennifer 3, Obdul Reid as Obdul, and Allegra Dawn Fetyko as Molly Finster Songs featured: "City Is Ours"
6	6	"Big Time Love Song"	Jon Rosenbaum	Scott Fellows	February 5, 2010	106	3.7
A new girl named Jo Taylor moves into the Palm Woods, and the boys fight over her attention. James has a severe allergic reaction to a body spray. Gustavo's personal helper "Freight Train" is introduced. Meanwhile, Katie chooses Gustavo as the subject for a school report so that she does not have to read anything. Griffin wants the band to record a slow love song, but Gustavo cannot make the song ("Any Kind of Guy") work. Guest starring: Tanya Chisholm as Kelly Wainwright, Challen Cates as Mrs. Knight, Erin Sanders as Camille, Matt Riedy as Griffin, Tiana Madry and Tiera Madry as the Simms Twins, Katelyn Tarver as Jo, Stephen Keys as Freight Train, Lorenzo Lamas as Dr. Hollywood, David Anthony Higgins as Mr. Bitters, Denyse Tontz as Jennifer 1, Spencer Locke as Jennifer 2, Savannah Jayde as Jennifer 3, Barnett O'Hara as Guitar Dude, Obdul Reid as Obdul and Rachel DiPillo as Rachael Songs featured: "Any Kind of Guy"
7	7	"Big Time Mansion"	Joe Menendez	Jed Spingarn	February 12, 2010	107	N/A
The boys "mansion sit" for Gustavo when he goes away to check out a new boy band called The Windmills. Gustavo reluctantly allows the boys to mansion sit, but they must follow his rules or be fired. What the boys expect to be an easy task turns into a "big time disaster" when things don't go according to plan. Mrs. Knight feels less needed with Kendall and the guys away, so Katie helps her mother by pretending to be sick. Guest starring: Tanya Chisholm as Kelly Wainwright, Challen Cates as Mrs. Knight, Eric Nelsen, A.J. Mendoza, and Kamen Edwards as Windmills and Stephen Keys as Freight Train Songs featured: "Famous", "Big Time Rush", "City Is Ours"
8	8	"Big Time Photo Shoot"	Jonathan Judge	Ron Holsey	February 26, 2010	108	N/A
In a flashback, the severely injured boys tell how they got beaten up so badly. They had their very first photo shoot as Big Time Rush, however, with Gustavo and Kelly doing community service for vandalizing Matthew McConaughey's mailbox, Griffin took over and made them "space matadors with stuffy puppies". Meanwhile, Katie and her mom were determined to get the autograph of teen hunk Dak Zevon, a possible Zac Efron parody. Guest starring: Tanya Chisholm as Kelly Wainwright, Erin Sanders as Camille, Challen Cates as Mrs. Knight, Curt Hansen as Dak Zevon, Carlos Alazraqui as Marcos Del Posey, Matt Riedy as Griffin, William Romeo as Security Guard #1, Jack Kennedy as Security Guard #2, Karen Strassman and Dominic Flores as The Corrections Officers, Jack Walsh as Gums, Obdul Reid as Obdul and Alex Barad as Pop Tiger Messenger
9	9	"Big Time Break"	Paul Lazarus	Lazar Saric	March 5, 2010	109	3.9
The boys learn that Gustavo is taking the day off, and are relieved to finally be able to spend some time apart. Logan is determined to get into a math lecture taught by Danica McKellar parody Phoebe Nachee, but is disappointed to find that the lecture is at an all-girls school. Carlos panics when he realizes that his helmet is missing, but gets a surprise visit from his policeman father, played by Erik Estrada in parody of his own role on CHiPs, who accompanies him to retrieve his helmet. James spends his day off trying to launch his acting career, with Camille's help. Kendall is desperate to spend time with his crush, Jo, but is discouraged when she continuously reminds him that she has a boyfriend. Katie finds out that Jo does not have a boyfriend, and tells Kendall, who is determined to get the truth out of her. Guest starring: Erik Estrada as Officer Garcia, Erin Sanders as Camille, Challen Cates as Mrs. Knight, Daran Norris as Buddha Bob, David Anthony Higgins as Mr. Bitters, Maggie Henry as Phoebe Nachee, Katelyn Tarver as Jo, Raquel Bell as Security Guard, Tucker Albrizzi as Tyler, Alyssa Preston as Tyler's Mom, Taylar Hollomon as Phoebe Nachee Fan, Diane Robin as Casting Director and Parker Young as Travis Songs featured: "Famous"
10	10	"Big Time Demos"	Henry Chan	Scott Fellows	March 19, 2010	110	3.1
The boys want desperately to remain in Los Angeles, but will be forced to head back to Minnesota if the record company does not approve their CD. Griffin's daughter Mercedes pretends to be the one who picks the demos. They discover that the demos are picked by a chimpanzee, and try to bribe it to pick theirs. Mrs. Knight tries to become assistant manager of the Palm Woods, to stay there for Katie's sake. Guest star(s): Tanya Chisholm as Kelly Wainwright, Challen Cates as Mrs. Knight, Carlie Casey as Mercedes Griffin, Matt Riedy as Griffin, James Arnold Taylor as Regional Manager Taylor, Daran Norris as Buddha Bob, David Anthony Higgins as Mr. Bitters, Grace Lee as Old Assistant Manager, Obdul Reid as Obdul and Kevin "Repo" Thomas as The 3K Resident Songs featured: "Big Time Rush", "Any Kind of Guy", "Famous", "Halfway There"
11	11	"Big Time Party"	Jon Rosenbaum	Dave Schiff	April 2, 2010	111	3.4
The boys find out that they are not invited to their own party at Rocque Records, and decide to throw their own in the Palm Woods, but are threatened by Mr. Bitters with eviction if they do so. They instead call the party a 'social gathering', which there is no rule against, and agree to invite three friends each. The party turns huge when Carlos mistakenly invites the entire contact list of his phone. Mr. Bitters hears the party, but Kendall and Jo divert him away from finding it. Camille and Mercedes both claim Logan as their date, and Logan tries to spend time with each without the other finding out. Guest starring: Tanya Chisholm as Kelly Wainwright, Challen Cates as Mrs. Knight, Erin Sanders as Camille, Katelyn Tarver as Jo, David Anthony Higgins as Mr. Bitters, Bonnie Morgan as Russian Acrobat Rena, Chris Grabher as Russian Acrobat Sergei, Carlie Casey as Mercedes Griffin, Matt Riedy as Griffin, Obdul Reid as Obdul, J.P. Gillain as Dutchman Koji Kataoka as Fujisaki and Ashley Monique Clark as Soda Girl Songs featured: "City Is Ours", "Halfway There", "Any Kind of Guy", "Big Time Rush", "Famous"
12	12	"Big Time Jobs"	David Kendall	Ron Holsey	April 16, 2010	113	N/A
Tired of paying for things the boys break, Gustavo makes them get jobs, banning them from the Palm Woods pool until they repay him $2,000.30. Carlos becomes Gustavo's production assistant but has trouble when Gustavo's automated coffee maker, C.A.L., becomes sentient and hostile, and attacks Carlos with espresso foam; James becomes a model, with Katie as his manager; Logan and Kendall start an illegal babysitting service, but find it more difficult than expected, and eventually make the kids wash cars. Guest starring: Tanya Chisholm as Kelly Wainwright, Challen Cates as Mrs. Knight, Matt Riedy as Griffin, Stephen Keys as Freight Train, David Anthony Higgins as Mr. Bitters, Darren Schnase as Cuda Photographer, Erica Shaffer as Wendell's Mom, Evan Lake Schelton as Wendell, Melisa LeGree as Lead Stylist, Obdul Reid as Obdul, and Rob Paulsen as Voice of C.A.L. Songs featured: "Famous", "City Is Ours"
13	13	"Big Time Blogger"	Savage Steve Holland	Dave Schiff	April 23, 2010	116	N/A
The boys must impress Deke, a well-known blogger whose words can control their career. Gustavo hires people to train the boys to have a good "Day with Deke", but Deke writes an unfavorable review, and the four must get him to change his mind before he posts it. In a Twitter parody, Gustavo gets into trouble when he gets a "Scuttlebutter" account and tries to send a Scutbut that he hates brussels sprouts, but instead types that he hates Brussels as in "Brussels, Belgium". Guest starring: Tanya Chisholm as Kelly Wainwright, David Anthony Higgins as Mr. Bitters, Matthew Moy as Deke, Rachel Quaintance as Roberta, Ahmed Best as Rob, Ted Garcia as Himself, Reece Kirk as Jean-Luc Varn Darn, and Clyde Yasuhara as Mr. Fong Songs featured: "Famous"
14	14	"Big Time Terror"	Savage Steve Holland	Scott Fellows	May 8, 2010	114	4.0
Gustavo moves in with the boys at the Palm Woods when his mansion floods, but the boys don't want him there, and will do whatever it takes to make him leave. Carlos and Mr. Bitters try to prove that there is a ghost in the Palm Woods, while Logan tries to prove them wrong. Guest starring: Tanya Chisholm as Kelly Wainwright, Challen Cates as Mrs. Knight, David Anthony Higgins as Mr. Bitters, Katelyn Tarver as Jo, Tristin Mays as Stephanie King, Keith Pillow as Mr. King and Rachel DiPillo as Rachael Songs Featured: "Stuck", "City Is Ours", "Shot In The Dark"
15	15	"Big Time Dance"	Fred Savage	Lazar Saric	June 4, 2010	115	4.7
The Palm Woods school is holding its first school dance, and Big Time Rush must perform. As each looks for his perfect date, they face the pressure of their first live performance. Kendall and Katie attempt to find a date for their mother, who will settle for no one less than the supermodel Fabio. Jo is upset that Kendall forgets to ask her to the dance. The Jennifers reject all the guys who ask them, including Carlos, but then all pick Carlos as their date, with the requirement that he appear as three different personas. Logan can't find the courage to ask Camille, and James inadvertently asks out numerous girls in his attempt to help Logan. Guest starring: Tanya Chisholm as Kelly Wainwright, Challen Cates as Mrs. Knight, Erin Sanders as Camille, Katelyn Tarver as Jo, Keith Allan as Pitchman, Tristin Mays as Stephanie, Tara Strong as Miss Collins, Fred Tallaksen as Mr. X, David Anthony Higgins as Mr. Bitters, Denyse Tontz as Jennifer 1, Kelli Goss as Jennifer 2, Savannah Jayde as Jennifer 3, Tucker Albrizzi as Tyler and Rachel DiPillo as Rachael Special guest star: Fabio Lanzoni as himself Songs featured: "Stuck", "City Is Ours"
16	16	"Big Time Sparks"	Stewart Schill	Jed Spingarn	June 18, 2010	117	N/A
Gustavo believes that the boys are bad luck, and tells them to stay away from Jordin Sparks while she stays at the Palm Woods and records at Rocque Records. They try to protect her, but accidentally push her into a well. Meanwhile, Gustavo and Kelly receive a package from Gustavo's rival producer "Hawk" with a skunk inside. They must get rid of it before it sprays the entire building. Guest starring: Tanya Chisholm as Kelly Wainwright, Katelyn Tarver as Jo, Stephen Keys as Freight Train, Phil LaMarr as Hawk, David Anthony Higgins as Mr. Bitters, Phillipi Sparks Jr. as himself and Merry Simkins as Sunblock Mom Special guest star: Jordin Sparks as herself Absent: Ciara Bravo as Katie Knight Songs featured: "Count On You"
17	17	"Big Time Fever"	Jonathan Judge	Jed Spingarn	June 26, 2010	112	3.1
The boys find out that James has "Hollywood fever", when he continuously uses a tanning-spray that ends up turning his skin orange. The boys try to get rid of James' tanning-spray, but Carlos and Logan catch Hollywood fever too, leaving it up to Kendall to get his friends back to normal. Meanwhile, in a massive heat wave, Katie sets up a snow-cone stand at the pool, at which Bitters tries to force her give him a part of the profits or shut the stand down. Guest starring: Tanya Chisholm as Kelly Wainwright Erin Sanders as Camille, Daran Norris as Buddha Bob, David Anthony Higgins as Mr. Bitters, Hira Ambrosino as the psychiatrist, Denyse Tontz as Jennifer 1, Kelli Goss as Jennifer 2, Savannah Jayde as Jennifer 3, Barnett O'Hara as Guitar Dude, Tucker Albrizzi as Tyler and Joe Thornton, Jr. as the health inspector Songs featured: "Stuck", "Famous"
18	18	"Big Time Video"	Jonathan Judge	Ron Holsey	July 31, 2010	118	N/A
Camille has to leave the Palm Woods unless she gets an acting job. The boys promise her, along with Jo and everyone else at the Palm Woods, a part in their upcoming music video, but Gustavo disallows this. Guest starring: Tanya Chisholm as Kelly Wainwright, Erin Sanders as Camille, Katelyn Tarver as Jo, Carlos Alazraqui as Marcos Del Posey, Daran Norris as Buddha Bob, David Anthony Higgins as Mr. Bitters, Denyse Tontz as Jennifer 1, Kelli Goss as Jennifer 2, Savannah Jayde as Jennifer 3, Barnett O'Hara as Guitar Dude and David Goldman as Camille's Dad Songs featured: "City Is Ours", "Big Time Rush"
19	19	"Big Time Concert"	Savage Steve Holland	Scott Fellows and Lazar Saric	August 20, 2010	119	3.3
20	20	"Big Time Concert"	Savage Steve Holland	Scott Fellows and Lazar Saric	August 20, 2010	120	3.3
On the eve of the album release, Griffin cancels the album, tour, and concert, and forces the boys to return to Minnesota. James doesn't want to leave the music business, and joins Gustavo's arch rival, Hawk. Gustavo has to come up with $2,000,000 to buy the band's contract from Griffin. Guest starring: Tanya Chisholm as Kelly Wainwright, Challen Cates as Mrs. Knight, Erin Sanders as Camille, Katelyn Tarver as Jo, Phil LaMarr as Hawk, Camilla Luddington as Rebecca, Fred Tallaksen as Mr. X, Curt Hansen as Dak Zevon, Rachel Quaintance as Roberta, Stephen Keys as Freight Train, Matt Riedy as Griffin, Sam Stone as Skippy, Anne E. Johnson as Mrs. Magicowski, Ed Brigadier as Sebastian, Andray Johnson as Executive, Barnett O'Hara as Guitar Dude, Ted Garcia as Himself, Obdul Reid as Obdul, Lucas Kwan Peterson as Keyboardist, Aaron M. Kahn as Bassist, Adam Conway as Guitarist, Maurice Whitfield as Drummer, and Brian McGovern as James' Dad Special guest star: Ed Begley, Jr., as himself. Songs featured: "City Is Ours", "This Is Our Someday", "Famous", "Big Time Rush"

=== Season 2 (2010–12) ===
No. overall	No. in season	Title	Directed by	Written by	Original release date	Prod. code	US viewers (millions)
21	1	"Welcome Back Big Time"	Scott Fellows	Scott Fellows	September 25, 2010	201	4.0
The boys return from their six-week tour triumphant and tired, and must catch up on the schoolwork they missed, to maintain their grade averages and attend Rocktoberfest. Carlos and James try to establish their Palm Woods cred again, but all of their attempts fail. Kendall and Jo's relationship is put to the test when she lands a part in a new television series, New Town High, and must make out with the male lead, Jett Stetson. Guest starring: Challen Cates as Mrs. Knight, Erin Sanders as Camille, Katelyn Tarver as Jo, Tara Strong as Ms. Collins, David Cade as Jett Stetson, David Anthony Higgins as Mr. Bitters, Matt Riedy as Griffin, Nick Bush as State Fair Reporter, Thomas Kasp as David, Mahaley Hessam as Sandra, Jose Brooks as Cole, Justin Giddings as Roadie, Denyse Tontz as Jennifer 1, Kelli Goss as Jennifer 2, Savannah Jayde as Jennifer 3, Barnett O'Hara as Guitar Dude, Obdul Reid as Obdul, Charlene deGuzman as Keyboardist, Aaron M. Kahn as Bassist, Adam Conway as Guitarist, Maurice Whitfield as Drummer, Christopher Weir as DJ and Glenn McCuen as Lil Lee Roth Songs featured: "City Is Ours", "Big Time Rush", "Til I Forget About You"
22	2	"Big Time Fans"	Jonathan Judge	Lazar Saric	October 1, 2010	202	N/A
Disaster results when the boys ignore advice not to give promises or personal information to fans. Dangerously clumsy hometown friend Jenny Tinkler shows up when Carlos promises her that the boys will help her achieve her dream of fame, and her accidents get them kicked out of the Palm Woods. A young fan befriends James, then locks him in the basement and assumes his identity. Death Smash, "the world's most destructive band", is unhappy about the broken air conditioning in Gustavo's studio, and threatens to cause more damage if it is not fixed. Guest starring: Erin Sanders as Camille, David Anthony Higgins as Mr. Bitters, Jonathan Brett as Buddy Simmons, Ray Conchado, Ron Ransen and Clint Tauscher as Death Smash, Ted Garcia as Himself, Seth Robert Dusky as LJ, Barnett O'Hara as Guitar Dude, and Sammy Jay as Jenny Tinkler Songs featured: "Famous"
23	3	"Big Time Girlfriends"	Stewart Schill	Jed Spingarn	October 11, 2010	203	5.0
Logan and Camille finally become a couple, but their relationship, along with Logan's friendship with James, is placed in jeopardy when James kisses Camille while helping her prepare for a movie audition. Gustavo wants the boys to sing a breakup song, and hires an actress to pretend to be Carlos' first girlfriend, so Carlos can learn a lesson about heartbreak. Kendall and Jo's schedules keep them from seeing each other. Guest starring: Erin Sanders as Camille, Katelyn Tarver as Jo, Chelsea Ricketts as Sasha, David Anthony Higgins as Mr. Bitters and Mike Carlucci as Jo's Driver Songs featured : "I Know You Know", "Boyfriend"
24	4	"Big Time Live"	Mort Nathan	Mark Fellows & Keith Wagner	October 15, 2010	204	3.1
The boys are scheduled for their first television appearance, on the local morning show A.M. LA. When it looks like they will be bumped from the schedule, the four do whatever it takes to make their TV debut happen, angering and infuriating Jane Kennedy, the producer, in the process. Katie becomes addicted to a DS game that battles a shebeast. Gustavo and Kelly must pass a test to keep their studio location, but Griffin rigs the test against them. Guest starring: Challen Cates as Mrs. Knight, Matt Riedy as Griffin, Crista Flanagan as Jane Kennedy, Robert Curtis Brown as Miles Bainbridge, Andrew Patrick Ralston as Teleprompter Gary, Obdul Reid as Obdul, Bashir Gavriel and Kyle S. More as Video Gamers and Shane Yoon as Weatherman Special guest star: Ed Begley, Jr., as himself Songs Featured : "Til I Forget About You"
25	5	"Big Time Halloween"	Paul Lazarus	Jessica Gao	October 22, 2010	205	3.1
It's Halloween in Palm Woodsylvania. James is a vampire, and in love with a vampire slayer (Jeanine Mason). Logan is a zombie who keeps losing his limbs, and has to devise a plan to keep Lightning from biting his body parts off. Carlos is Franken-Carlos, and Kendall is a werewolf who is trying to hide his real identity from Jo. Griffin tells Gustavo that the boys cannot perform on his "Big Night of Fright" unless he turns them into "normals." Gustavo tests his "Hot Boy Band Machine", which results in more trouble. Guest starring: Challen Cates as Mrs. Knight, David Anthony Higgins as Mr. Bitters, Katelyn Tarver as Jo, Matt Riedy as Griffin, Barnett O'Hara as Guitar Dude, Obdul Reid as Obdul, Charlene deGuzman as Keyboardist, Aaron M. Kahn as Bassist, Adam Conway as Guitarist, Maurice Whitfield as Drummer and Jeanine Mason as Muffy Songs featured: "Big Night"
26	6	"Big Time Sneakers"	Jonathan Judge	Scott Fellows	November 5, 2010	206	2.8
Jo's publicist wants the press to think that she is dating her co-star Jett, so she and Kendall must keep their relationship hidden by going on dates in disguise. Carlos and Katie name themselves Robin and Hoodie when Bitters overprices their favorite snacks, and the pair try to find other ways to get their Fruit Smackers. James and Logan try to buy and resell sneakers. Guest starring: Katelyn Tarver as Jo Taylor, David Cade as Jett Stetson, Stephen Keys as Freight Train, David Anthony Higgins as Mr. Bitters, Beth Dover as Amy, and Challen Cates as Mrs. Knight.
27	7	"Big Time Pranks"	Savage Steve Holland	Lazar Saric	November 19, 2010	207	3.8
The Palm Woods' annual prank-day contest becomes a battle of boys vs. girls. Logan hurts his eyes when his prank backfires, and becomes Dr. Hollywood's assistant for the day. Gustavo and Kelly's prank-themed day escalates into minor destruction and violence. Guest starring: Erin Sanders as Camille, Katelyn Tarver as Jo Taylor, Matt Riedy as Griffin, Tucker Albrizzi as Tyler, David Cade as Jett Stetson, Malia Dawkins as pranked girl, Lorenzo Lamas as Dr. Hollywood, Challen Cates as Mrs. Knight, Barnett O'Hara as Guitar Dude, Obdul Reid as Obdul, Denyse Tontz, Kelli Goss and Savannah Jayde as the Jennifers, and David Anthony Higgins as Mr. Bitters.
28	8	"Big Time Christmas"	Savage Steve Holland	Mark Fellows & Keith Wagner (Part 1); Scott Fellows (Part 2)	December 4, 2010	209	5.0
29	9	"Big Time Christmas"	Savage Steve Holland	Mark Fellows & Keith Wagner (Part 1); Scott Fellows (Part 2)	December 4, 2010	210	5.0
The boys are excited about their holiday trip to Minnesota, but hours before their flight, Griffin insists that they record a Christmas EP, and will not let them leave until it is done. Two of the songs are celebrity duets, "All I Want For Christmas Is You" with Miranda Cosgrove, and "Yard Squirrel Christmas" with Snoop Dogg. Mrs. Knight attempts to avoid a luggage fee by packing presents and clothes, and Katie tries to give a Scrooge-esque Mr. Bitters some holiday cheer. Guest starring: Erin Sanders as Camille, Challen Cates as Mrs. Knight, David Anthony Higgins as Mr. Bitters, Katelyn Tarver as Jo Taylor, David Cade as Jett Stetson, Denyse Tontz, Kelli Goss and Savannah Jayde as the Jennifers, Stacey Moseley as Miranda's producer, Obdul Reid as Obdul, and Matt Riedy as Griffin. Special guest star(s): Miranda Cosgrove, Snoop Dogg, and Fabio as themselves, and Tom Kane as the narrator Songs featured: "Beautiful Christmas", "All I Want for Christmas is You"
30	10	"Big Time Guru"	Jonathan Judge	Jed Spingarn	January 8, 2011	208	3.8
An angry Gustavo chases BTR into the Palm Woods, where Buddha Bob performs a "Himalayan monkey pinch" that makes Gustavo so mellow that he can't write a good song for the New Town High soundtrack. Kelly and Kendall team up to help Gustavo return to his regular, angry self before the New Town High producers find out that there's a problem. A "Swagger" app that Logan downloads to his phone increases his swagger, but decreases James' so much that James almost "dies" from low swagger counts. Carlos panics when told by the parrot who's advising him that he has 24 hours to live. Guest starring: Erin Sanders as Camille, Rob Paulsen as Superparrot, Daran Norris as Buddha Bob, Jeffrey Ross as a fake record producer, and David Anthony Higgins as Mr. Bitters. Songs featured : "This Is Our Someday", "Nothing Even Matters"
31	11	"Big Time Crush"	Carlos Gonzalez	Lazar Saric	February 5, 2011	212	3.9
Kendall and Jo help Carlos find a date. Logan flirts with a new girl, Peggy, while confused about his feelings for Camille. James tries to help Katie get closer to her new crush, Kyle, but acts like an overprotective brother instead. Logan wants to get back together with Camille, but she goes on a date with Steve. Guest starring: Erin Sanders as Camille, Carlson Young as Peggy, Katelyn Tarver as Jo Taylor, Jerry Phillips as Kyle, Kim Hidalgo as Megan, Najarra Townsend as James' date, Bryan Cid Borrero as Steve, and Challen Cates as Mrs. Knight. Absent: Stephen Kramer Glickman as Gustavo Rocque and Tanya Chisholm as Kelly Wainwright
32	12	"Big Time Beach Party"	Savage Steve Holland	Jed Spingarn & Jessica Gao	February 21, 2011	214	4.2
33	13	"Big Time Beach Party"	Savage Steve Holland	Jed Spingarn & Jessica Gao	February 21, 2011	215	4.2
The boys make a deal with Griffin that, if they have a number one hit, they and their Palm Woods friends can have a party at his Malibu beach house. Jo is on a film shoot, and Kendall arrives alone. A crazed fan named Sandy claims that she is Kendall's girlfriend and tries to 'steal' Kendall from Jo. James believes that Annie (Gage Golightly), a girl who saved him while surfing, is a mermaid. He tries to prove it with Camille's help, but falls in love with her. Logan and Carlos search for gold, in hopes of impressing the Jennifers with a beach house. They meet the SpongeBob SquarePants character Patchy the Pirate (Tom Kenny), and together try to find Patchy the Pirate's buried treasure. Meanwhile, Katie attempts to become Russell Brand's manager, Mrs. Knight attacks the boys with suntan lotion, and Gustavo tries to sabotage the party when he worries the boys will split up like what happened with another boy band of his. Guest stars: Erin Sanders as Camille, Katelyn Tarver as Jo Taylor, Challen Cates as Mrs. Knight, Jayme Lynn Evans as Sandy, Matt Riedy as Griffin, Rick Gifford as Marvin, Denyse Tontz, Kelli Goss and Savannah Jayde as the Jennifers, June Mock as Russell's assistant, Barnett O'Hara as Guitar Dude, Mike Carlucci as Jo's driver, Robert Pine as J.D., Daran Norris as Buddha Bob, Obdul Reid as Obdul, and Jack DePew as Tad. Special guest star(s): Russell Brand as himself, Tom Kenny as Patchy the Pirate, Gage Golightly as Annie. Songs featured: "Boyfriend", "Dance, Dance, Dance"
34	14	"Big Time Songwriters"	Jonathan Judge	Jessica Gao	March 5, 2011	211	3.5
Griffin is releasing the BTR deluxe edition album. Gustavo hires songwriters who only fight, and Gustavo has to write the song himself. The boys want to write a song, but Gustavo won't allow it, so they get Katie to distract him by opening a health spa in the Palm Woods. Kendall and Carlos write a song named "Oh", and fight with James and Logan, who prefer their song, "Yeah." Guest starring: Erin Sanders as Camille, Daran Norris as Buddha Bob, Dorian Kingi and Trampas Thompson as Jambox and Daryl, David Anthony Higgins as Mr. Bitters, Obdul Reid as Obdul, and Matt Riedy as Griffin. Songs featured : "Oh Yeah"
35	15	"Big Time Reality"	Jonathan Judge	Mark Fellows & Keith Wagner	March 26, 2011	216	N/A
Griffin turns BTR into a reality show, and allows an audience vote that will eliminate a member of the band. To keep audience interest, Carlos and James fight nonstop, while Logan and Camille fake a melodramatic relationship. Kendall attempts to unplug all the cameras, after one catches him off-guard at the Palm Woods pool. In order to get the show cancelled and keep the group together, the boys must prove to Griffin that a reality show is a bad idea. Guest starring: Erin Sanders as Camille, Joe Souza as Snake Timmons, Challen Cates as Mrs. Knight, Bobby Lee as TJ, Keith Blaney as fired executive, Matt Riedy as Griffin, Obdul Reid as Obdul
36	16	"Big Time Girl Group"	Jon Rosenbaum	Scott Fellows	April 9, 2011	213	5.7
The boys of Big Time Rush are jealous when their single "I Know You Know" is taken by Kat's Crew, a female pop group whom Gustavo is working with. A war begins between Kat's Crew and Big Time Rush, who believe that Gustavo will lose interest, and cancel them. Meanwhile, Katie and Mrs. Knight try to find good friends. Guest starring: Fred Tallaksen as Mr. X, Challen Cates as Mrs. Knight, Tucker Albrizzi as Tyler, Alyssa Preston as Tyler's Mom, Danielle Bessler and Cristal Guel as Kat's Crew, Andrew Bowen as the leader of Boys in the Attic, and Daran Norris as Buddha Bob. Special guest star: Cymphonique Miller as Kat, the lead singer of Kat's Crew Songs featured: "I Know You Know"
37	17	"Green Time Rush"	Savage Steve Holland	Jessica Gao	April 22, 2011	219	3.5
In a class Earth Day competition to win a week without school, Kendall is partnered with his enemy Jett. Logan is teamed up with the school bully Ozzy Clark, and is forced to do all the work for his project. Carlos and James work together and, after finding that all their ideas are already taken, decide to put a cow in every apartment. Katie tries to stop Rocque Records from using foam cups, but Griffin won't allow it, because foam cups are RCM CBT Globalnet Sanyoid's biggest product. Guest starring: Erin Sanders as Camille, Challen Cates as Mrs. Knight, Tara Strong as Ms. Collins, Denyse Tontz, Kelli Goss and Savannah Jayde as the Jennifers, Matt Riedy as Griffin, Stefan Van Ray as Ozzy Clark, David Anthony Higgins as Mr. Bitters, Obdul Reid as Obdul, and David Cade as Jett Stetson. Songs featured: "Halfway There"
38	18	"Big Time Moms"	Savage Steve Holland	Scott Fellows	May 7, 2011	217	N/A
James' mom, nicknamed the "Estee Lauder of the Midwest" for her successful cosmetics line, arrives at the Palm Woods to bring James home and groom him to take over the family company. The boys must act fast to save the band, and need to stand up to a woman who is not used to being told "no". Guest starring: Lisa Rinna as Mrs. Brooke Diamond, Challen Cates as Mrs. Jennifer Knight, Daran Norris as Buddha Bob, Hahn Cho as angry resident, Barnett O'Hara as Guitar Dude, Jill-Michele Melean as Mrs. Sylvia Garcia, Holly Wortell as Mrs. Joanne Mitchell, Casey Burke and Mario Lara as pet owners, Peggy Miley as Mr. Bitters' Mom, and David Anthony Higgins as Mr. Reginald Bitters. Special guest star: Lita Ford as herself Songs Featured: "The Mom Song"
39	19	"Big Time Prom Kings"	Scott Fellows	Scott Fellows	May 21, 2011	221	3.8
The Palm Woods school is having its annual prom, and Kendall, James, Carlos and Logan are each determined to win the title of Prom King. Carlos takes one of the Jennifers as his date, but mistakenly dumps her, and the Jennifers team up to destroy him. Jo is grounded, and Kendall sneaks her out of her apartment, but they get caught by her father. Logan is jealous that Camille is going with someone else to the prom, so he tries to make sure that James and his date will be Prom King and Queen. James tries to get Aubrey Stewart, from "The Vampire Stories Chronicles Saga Trilogy", as his date, but is hunted by her bodyguards. Guest starring: Erin Sanders as Camille, Katelyn Tarver as Jo Taylor, Daran Norris as Buddha Bob, Todd Bryant as lead bodyguard, Tom Schmidt as Jo's father, Barnett O'Hara as Guitar Dude, Bryan Cid Borrero as Steve, Hannah Landberg as Aubrey Stewart and Denyse Tontz, Kelli Goss, and Savannah Jayde as the Jennifers. Songs featured : "Nothing Even Matters"
40	20	"Big Time Break-Up"	Stewart Schill	Lazar Saric	June 25, 2011	218	3.6
Jo is offered a role in a film that is shooting in New Zealand for the next three years. She tells Kendall that she cannot do the movie due to her New Town High contract, but Kendall and Katie find that she can be released from the contract if offered a part in a major motion picture. Meanwhile, James and Latino pop star Selana enter a three-day whirlwind relationship, while Logan and Kelly join forces to separate Carlos from his beloved hockey helmet after Gustavo demands that he not wear it anymore. Kendall tries to get Jo to break up with him to convince her to take the role. Guest starring: Katelyn Tarver as Jo Taylor, Christian Castellanos as Selana, Linda Cevallos as Selana's manager, Mike Carlucci as Jo's driver, and Nikea Gamby-Turner as female airport security worker. Songs featured : "Worldwide"
41	21	"Big Time Single"	Savage Steve Holland	Mark Fellows & Keith Wagner	July 23, 2011	225	3.1
James, Carlos, and Logan help Kendall cheer up after his break-up with Jo, so he can get prepared for the band's new single. Kendall tells them that they can't know what he's going through because they've never had their hearts broken, so they each date a girl from the Palm Woods just to break up with them. Gustavo suffers from writer's block while trying to write the band’s summer single. Katie, who's writing a school report about Gustavo, helps him think of a song idea. Guest starring: Erin Sanders as Camille, Denyse Tontz, Kelli Goss, and Savannah Jayde as the Jennifers, Matt Riedy as Griffin, Obdul Reid as Obdul. Songs featured: "If I Ruled the World"
42	22	"Big Time Wedding"	Stewart Schill	Jed Spingarn	August 20, 2011	220	3.2
Big Time Rush have a number one record in the country of Kerplankistan, and its King and Princess visit America. The King plans for his daughter to marry one of them. James inadvertently proposes marriage to her, and the boys try to free James. Katie discovers that Buddha Bob is a Canadian immigrant who is about to be sent back. She convinces her mother to marry him so he can stay, and Mrs. Knight finds that Buddha Bob would be a good husband. Guest starring: Daran Norris as Buddha Bob, Challen Cates as Mrs. Jennifer Knight, Annet Mahendru as Princess Svetlana, Matthew Florida as dirt boy, Nikka Far as Princess of Kerplankistan, Hamilton Mitchell as government agent and David Anthony Higgins as Mr. Bitters. Songs featured: "If I Ruled the World"
43	23	"Big Time Rocker"	Carlos Gonzalez	Jessica Gao	September 24, 2011	223	2.9
Eighteen-year-old rocker Lucy Stone moves into the Palm Woods, and James and Carlos compete to see who she will choose as her boyfriend. Lucy agrees to date both of them, but gets them to break up with her in order to put them in the 'friend zone'. Kendall teams up with Gustavo and Kelly to prove to Lucy that Big Time Rush 'rocks'. While rehearsing for her role in an upcoming movie, Spy High, Camille takes things too far, and steals all of the money from the safe in Bitters' office. Special Guest Star: Malese Jow as Lucy Stone Guest Starring: Erin Sanders as Camille, Barnett O'Hara as Guitar Dude, and David Anthony Higgins as Mr. Bitters. Songs featured : "Paralyzed"
44	24	"Big Time Strike"	Jonathan Judge	Lazar Saric	October 10, 2011	224	2.5
The boys take a stand against Gustavo's harsh management style, which includes electric shocks, and refrain from recording a song for their follow-up album. Katie says that being a mother is an easy job, so Mrs. Knight goes on strike, and leaves Katie to do the household chores. Guest Starring: Challen Cates as Mrs. Jennifer Knight, Matt Riedy as Griffin. Songs featured : "Superstar"
45	25	"Big Time Contest"	Joe Menendez	Mark Fellows & Keith Wagner	October 15, 2011	222	3.0
Four BTR fans win a Pop Tiger magazine contest to spend a day with one of the boys from Big Time Rush. The winners include Bobby, a demanding young boy who develops a crush on Katie, and Bruna, an outgoing older woman who has never heard of the band. James constantly switches dates (Jennette and Tiffany who are the other two contest winners) with Carlos, as he continually feels the other girl is better. Guest Starring: Michele Boyd as Annie Windsor, Julie Brown as Bruna, Abbie Cobb as Jeanette, Clayton Mattingly as Bobby and Zuleyka Silver as Tiffany.
46	26	"Big Time Superheroes"	Savage Steve Holland	Scott Fellows	October 29, 2011	226	2.6
Hawk steals the only hard-drive containing Big Time Rush's second album, and gives the songs to Zwagger, a new band that he's producing. In a Ghostbusters parody at the Palm Woods, Katie helps Buddha Bob rid the Palmwoods of a persistent clog that once shut down the building for a year, and appears ready to do so again. Guest Stars: Phil LaMarr as Hawk, Daran Norris as Buddha Bob, Challen Cates as Mrs. Knight and David Anthony Higgins as Mr. Bitters. Special Guest Stars: Forrest Burnham as Zwagger and Cedric Yarbrough as Chief Lieutenant Officer. Songs featured: "Blow Your Speakers Out"
47	27	"Big Time Secret"	Jonathan Judge	Dan Serafin	November 5, 2011	227	N/A
James admits that he threw away a note to Carlos from Heather Fox (Elizabeth Gillies), Carlos' camp crush. Obligated under the "best friend code", James discovers that Heather is at Colossal Studios filming a commercial. Logan is worried when Lucy notices Kendall sneaking away with Camille sneaking off together. Gustavo and Kelly become obsessed with trying to get Mrs. Knight's recipe for snickerdoodles, which Mrs. Knight claims is a family secret for those over 21. Special Guest Stars: Elizabeth Gillies as Heather Fox and Malese Jow as Lucy Stone. Guest Starring: Erin Sanders as Camille Roberts and Challen Cates as Mrs. Knight.
48	28	"Big Time Interview"	Savage Steve Holland	Jessica Gao, Mark Fellows & Keith Wagner	November 19, 2011	229	2.4
The boys sit down for an interview with Access Hollywood. They recall their greatest moments and reveal pictures and secrets. Guest Starring: Madison Michele as herself and Challen Cates as Mrs. Knight. Songs featured: "If I Ruled the World", "Big Time Rush", "Paralyzed", "Superstar", "Blow Your Speakers", "Big Night", "Music Sounds Better with U", "Worldwide"
49	29	"Big Time Move"	Savage Steve Holland	Lazar Saric	January 28, 2012	228	3.2
After a big fight, the boys decide to move out. James squats in a cool retiree’s apartment and adopts his swinging senior lifestyle, Logan moves into a Palm Woods cabana, and Carlos goes rustic in a cardboard house in Palm Woods Park. Kendall is determined to convince them to move back to their real home and make them realize that no fight is worth losing a friend over. Meanwhile, Gustavo and Kelly plan the band's upcoming world tour, but Gustavo breaks his back while picking up a banana peel. Guest Starring: Erin Sanders as Camille, Malese Jow as Lucy Stone, Savannah Jayde as Jennifer 3, David "Gruber" Allen as therapist, David Anthony Higgins as Mr. Bitters and Challen Cates as Mrs. Knight. Songs featured : "All Over Again"

=== Film (2012) ===
Title	Directed by	Written by	Original release date	US viewers (millions)
Big Time Movie	Savage Steve Holland	Scott Fellows	March 10, 2012	4.1
On route to the first stop of the Big Time Rush "All Over The World Tour", Carlos has a dream in which he is a spy, and the group rescues a princess. At the airport, an M16 agent pursued by British agents switches Kendall's backpack with his identical one, which is revealed to contain an evil gravitational device. The boys team up with the kidnapped MI6 agent's daughter, Penny Lane, and promise to help save her father. Their tour director wants to cancel the tour, while Gustavo and Kelly try to save it, but secret agents tell them that BTR want to take over the world. Guest Stars: Emma Lahana as Penny Lane, Emily Holmes as MI6 agent #2, Trevor Devall as Atticus Moon, Christopher Shyer as Agent Lane, Garry Chalk as MI6 agent #1 and Challen Cates as Mrs. Jennifer Knight. Songs featured : "Help!", "Can't Buy Me Love", "We Can Work It Out", "Revolution", "A Hard Day's Night", "Elevate" Note: The first promo for the movie aired on February 4, 2012. The soundtrack for this movie was available for pre-order February 15 and was available for purchase on July 6, 2012. The movie contains numerous references to and covers of songs by The Beatles. "I Wanna Hold Your Hand" is a bonus track on the Big Time Movie Soundtrack EP. The movie premiered on May 26th 2012 on Nickelodeon (UK & Ireland). Like the US, it was hosted by the boy band One Direction and was part of Big Time Weekend.

=== Season 3 (2012) ===
No. overall	No. in season	Title	Directed by	Written by	Original release date	Prod. code	US viewers (millions)
50	1	"Backstage Rush"	Stewart Schill	Scott Fellows	May 12, 2012	301	2.3
On their last day of their "All Over the World Tour", the boys want to learn how to change costumes faster, so they can break a backstage record held by NSYNC. Logan wanted to finish a book before the tour ends and French Inspector Henri Duchamp was looking for Carlos after posting online that he took a cricket out of France. Meanwhile, Kelly must save the boys from a faulty stage trampoline, but she is trapped outside. Guest Stars: Jonathan Schmock as the French Inspector Song featured: "Love Me Love Me", "Blow Your Speakers", "Famous", "Time of Our Life", "Boyfriend", "This Is Our Someday", "Cover Girl", "City Is Ours", "Elevate"
51	2	"Big Time Returns"	Scott Fellows	Scott Fellows	June 25, 2012	302	2.3
Big Time Rush returns to the Palm Woods after their world tour and learn they are now famous. Logan decides he wants to date Camille again and let her make the first move, but Buddha Bob tells Camille to let Logan make the first move. Wanting to pick up where he left off with Lucy, James invokes the 'Rule of Dibs' and forbids Kendall to talk or be anywhere near her. When Lucy finds out about this, she decided to call dibs on Kendall. As punishment for breaking the Rule of Dibs, he has to run around in his underwear repeatedly. Carlos, as always, wants a girlfriend out of the Jennifers, but is caught between Griffin and Gustavo, who want him to choose "Love Me, Love Me", or "Elevate", as the group's newest single to play for JoJo On The Radio. Meanwhile, Mrs. Knight battles with Mr. Bitters to stop his paparazzi-like experience from intruding on the boys' lives. Songs featured: "Windows Down", "Elevate", "Love Me Love Me" Guest Stars: Erin Sanders as Camille, Malese Jow as Lucy, Kelli Goss, Savannah Jayde and Denyse Tontz as The Jennifers, Matt Riedy as Griffin, Obdul Reid as Obdul, Daran Norris as Buddha Bob, Challen Cates as Jennifer Knight, David Anthony Higgins as Mr. Bitters, JoJo Wright as himself.
52	3	"Bel Air Rush"	David Kendall	Mark Fellows & Keith Wagner	July 2, 2012	303	2.9
Because of the paparazzi and crazy fans, Gustavo moves the boys to Bel-Air, but the boys dislike the confinements of their new ritzy lifestyle and make a plan to return to the Palm Woods. Meanwhile, Gustavo and Kelly want to visit the boys and try to get past the security. Songs featured: "Movin' Up to Bel Air", "Love Me Love Me", "Windows Down", "Elevate" Guest Stars: Erin Sanders as Camille, Challen Cates as Jennifer Knight, Daran Norris as Buddha Bob, & Kelli Goss, Savannah Jayde and Denyse Tontz as The Jennifers Special Guest Stars: Rachel Crow as Winnie, Alfonso Ribeiro as Captain McAllister and Fabio Lanzoni as Himself
53	4	"Big Time Double Date"	Joe Menendez	Jed Spingarn	July 9, 2012	304	N/A
Kendall has dinner with Lucy and her parents who believe she is a classical musician. Meanwhile, Logan goes on a date with a girl he has the same interests, after a fight with Camille and Carlos is on a date with a Jennifer and James wants to help him. Guest Stars : Malese Jow as Lucy Stone, Erin Sanders as Camille, Denyse Tontz, Kelli Goss & Savannah Jayde as The Jennifers, David Cade as Jett Stetson, Challen Cates as Mrs. Knight, Susan Yeagley as Mrs. Stone, Charles Chun as Mr. Stone, Cooper Neu as Lindsay (Logan's Date) Songs featured: "Cover Girl"
54	5	"Big Time Merchandise"	Carlos Gonzalez	Jed Spingarn	July 16, 2012	305	N/A
The boys dislike Griffin's new line of Big Time Rush merchandise and attempt to sabotage his sales plan. Meanwhile, Katie accidentally destroys her mother's Palm Woods robe and buys a replacement robe from Bitters. Guest Stars: Matt Riedy as Griffin, Rob Paulsen as Sam Sellmart, David Anthony Higgins as Mr. Bitters, Rachel Quaintance & Ahmed Best as Marketing Team Songs featured: "Elevate"
55	6	"Big Time Surprise"	Julian Petrillo	Scott Fellows	September 22, 2012	306	2.9
Kendall attempts to ask Lucy out on a date, until her ex-boyfriend Beau arrives at the Palm Woods to reunite with her. Moments later, he is caught also making out with other girls at the Palm Woods. With James, Jett and Camille to assist, Kendall is determined to document evidence of Beau's activity. Meanwhile, Griffin orders Gustavo to kidnap him, so Gustavo hires Carlos and Logan to do the job (with surprising consequences). Also, Mrs. Knight and Katie (with help from Buddha Bob) try to steal Jett's computer to find out the ending of the cliffhanger episode of New Town High which Jett is on. Guest Stars: Malese Jow as Lucy Stone, Erin Sanders as Camille, Katelyn Tarver as Jo Taylor, Bryan Lillis as Beau, David Cade as Jett Stetson, Challen Cates as Mrs. Knight, Daran Norris as Buddha Bob, Matt Riedy as Griffin, Obdul Reid as Obdul Song featured: "Elevate"
56	7	"Big Time Decision"	Jonathan Judge	Lazar Saric & Jed Spingarn	September 29, 2012	307	2.4
Immediately picking up where the previous episode had ended, Jo returns to the Palm Woods having her movie career in New Zealand ended early due to the set burning down in a fire. Kendall is unsure whether he has moved on with Lucy during Jo's absence, or whether he still has feelings for Jo and has to pick one girl before the other one leaves the Palm Woods. Meanwhile, Carlos has to make a choice to stand by either his best friend James, or his new benefactor Mr. Bitters, during a supposed zombie apocalypse. Katie finds Kendall outside Rocque Records, after briefly running the company, and tells him to follow his heart. Guest Stars: Malese Jow as Lucy Stone, Erin Sanders as Camille, Katelyn Tarver as Jo Taylor, Daran Norris as Buddha Bob, Matt Riedy as Griffin, David Anthony Higgins as Mr. Bitters Songs featured: "Time Of Our Life", "No Idea"
57	8	"Big Time Babysitting"	Jonathan Judge	Dan Serafin	October 13, 2012	308	2.8
Kendall and Logan have to babysit a rock legend before his hall of fame induction, but he keeps having heart attacks. Meanwhile, Carlos and James have to babysit Katie, and keep her from leaving the Palmwoods, so they can get toys. Gustavo and Kelly try to get the special Green Kiwi Jellybeans that Puppy Dog stole from Babylace, so they won't get fired. Jo and Kendall's relationship is becoming awkward with Jo seeing Kendall kiss Lucy. Guest Stars: Jess Harnell as Babylace, Katelyn Tarver as Jo Taylor, Donis Leonard Jr. as Puppy Dog, Patrick Hancock as Hall of Rock floor manager and Challen Cates as Mrs. Knight, Anthony Alabi as Puppy Dog's Bodyguard
58	9	"Big Time Gold"	Nisha Ganatra	Mark Fellows & Keith Wagner	October 20, 2012	311	2.6
Camille finds a gold necklace and believes it's Logan anniversary gift to her, when it's really Kendall's birthday gift for Jo. Meanwhile, James and Carlos want to find out if they can listen to BTR in pure gold without getting caught by Gustavo. Guest Stars: Erin Sanders as Camille, Katelyn Tarver as Jo Taylor, Daran Norris as Buddha Bob, Matt Riedy as Griffin, David Anthony Higgins as Mr. Bitters Note: The song "ja da" by Bill Halley plays on the record.
59	10	"Big Time Camping"	David Kendall	Lazar Saric	October 27, 2012	309	2.5
Gustavo doesn't allow the boys to go camping because he fears for their safety, so they resort to camping on a sound stage with Jo, Camille, and the Jennifers, but end up with a face off (Boys vs Girls). Meanwhile, Gustavo is trying to stop the boys camping section with the help of Kelly because he is afraid of them getting hurt. Elsewhere, Katie and Mrs. Knight are camping outside to get a new iSlab 3, but Mr. Bitters had saved Jett a space on line. Guest Stars: Erin Sanders as Camille, Denyse Tontz, Kelli Goss & Savannah Jayde as The Jennifers, Katelyn Tarver as Jo Taylor, David Cade as Jett Stetson, Wendy Worthington as Beulah, Nathan Anderson as Director, David Anthony Higgins as Mr. Bitters and Challen Cates as Mrs. Knight Song featured: "Love Me Love Me"
60	11	"Big Time Rescue"	Joe Menendez	Lazar Saric	November 3, 2012	310	2.6
James and Logan volunteer at a dog shelter and end up adopting eight dogs. Meanwhile, Kendall finds Carlos and Jennifer's puppy love sickening so he asks for Jo's help to break the relationship. Guest Stars: Katelyn Tarver as Jo Taylor, Kelli Goss as Jennifer 2, David Cade as Jett Stetson, David Anthony Higgins as Mr. Bitters and Challen Cates as Mrs. Knight Song featured: "Time of Our Life"
61	12	"Big Time Bloopers"	Scott Fellows	Dan Serafin	November 10, 2012	312	2.5
The boys mistakenly destroy the tape with their last episode of Season 3, so they quickly set up a bloopers and outtakes episode hosted by Stephen Kramer Glickman and Ciara Bravo as themselves. Special Guest Star: Chris Paul as himself Song featured: "Big Time Rush", "Elevate", "Time of Our Life", "Love Me Love Me"

=== Season 4 (2013) ===
No. overall	No. in season	Title	Directed by	Written by	Original release date	Prod. code	US viewers (millions)
62	1	"Big Time Invasion"	Savage Steve Holland	Scott Fellows	May 2, 2013	401	1.9
The new British boy bands "invade" the music business, and Big Time Rush are afraid they are going to end their career. To save their career, they decide to hire new managers, but disagree on who they are going to take, so Kendall and Carlos go with the first and James and Logan with the second. Meanwhile, Katie is trying to find a best friend to talk about boys, but Mr. Bitters has turned the Palm Woods into a businessman living place, so along with Buddha Bob they try to kick them out. Guest Starring: Challen Chates as Mrs. Knight, Daran Norris as Buddha Bob, Timothy Brennen as Alan Sharp, J. P. Manoux as Mitchell Gold, David Anthony Higgins as Mr. Bitters, Matt Riedy as Griffin, Obdul Reid as Obdul, Katelyn Tarver as Jo and Erin Sanders as Camille. Special Guest Stars : Jon Stewart, Gavin DeGraw and Terrence Jenkins Songs featured: "Like Nobody's Around"
63	2	"Big Time Scandal"	Savage Steve Holland	Lazar Saric	May 9, 2013	402	1.9
Big Time Rush are accused for scandals: Lucy Stone releases an album about a bad break-up with a guy who is rumored to be Kendall, Carlos tries to swat a bee and is accused by E! News for hitting grannies and Logan is accused for trying to rob a granny, which was really helping. Meanwhile, James spreads up a rumor about him doing a duet with Cher Lloyd. Guest Stars: Malese Jow as Lucy Stone, Katelyn Tarver as Jo Taylor, Erin Sanders as Camille, David Cade as Jett, Daran Norris as Buddha Bob Special Guest Stars : Cher Lloyd as herself, Terrence Jenkins Songs featured: "Picture This", "With Ur Love" (by Cher Lloyd)
64	3	"Big Time Lies"	Jonathan Judge	Dan Serafin	May 16, 2013	403	1.6
Lucy tries to get Kendall back, but Kendall lies to Jo and tells nothing is happening. Meanwhile, James and Carlos lie to Gustavo about destroying his office and make up a story about a robbery and Logan lies to Camille about being sick, because he doesn't want to come to a boring play. Guest Stars: Katelyn Tarver as Jo, Erin Sanders as Camille, Malese Jow as Lucy Stone, Daran Norris as Buddha Bob, Lorenzo Lamas as Dr. Hollywood, Challen Cates as Mrs. Knight. Special Guest Star: Cedric Yarbrough as Chief Lieutenant Officer Song featured: "Like Nobody's Around"
65	4	"Big Time Bonus"	Stewart Schill	Mark Fellows & Keith Wagner	May 23, 2013	404	1.9
Griffin gives the boys a $20,000 bonus and wants them to prove him they will spend them with responsibility. Kendall wants to invest them on orange stock, but he accidentally buys a truck full of oranges. James buys a snake to impress Lucy, but it turns out she doesn't like snakes and then he loses the snake. Carlos buys a personal assistant and Logan can't resist tipping people. Guest Stars: Matt Riedy as Griffin, Challen Cates as Mrs. Knight, Erin Sanders as Camille, Malese Jow as Lucy, Mason McCulley as Carlos' assistant, John Jenkinson as Palm Woods Food Seller, Alden Ray as Guy who James hired to find his snake, Obdul Reid as Obdul, Special Guest Stars Eleni Louka as herself Songs featured: "24/Seven"
66	5	"Big Time Cameo"	Savage Steve Holland	Jed Spingarn	May 30, 2013	405	1.7
Gustavo books the boys to a lot of painful TV show cameos, but they decide to do no more cameos, until they get booked for "Coco.0", a show Carlos loves and has a pretty main character, Dara Larameigh. But Dara's evil stepmother controls her life, and decides what she will eat and say and who she will date. Along with Kendall, they create a plan for make them to kiss. Meanwhile, James and Logan try to sneak in Yo Gabba Gabba's stage for eat their snacks and Gustavo, Kelly and Katie try to come up with a better script for Big Time Rush's cameo. Guest Stars: Daniela Bobadilla as Dara Larameigh, Lisa Arch as Dara’s stepmother, Yo Gabba Gabba as themselves, Sinead Devries as Dara's best friend and Challen Cates as Mrs. Jennifer Knight Special Guest Stars: Lucas Cruikshank as himself and Scott Baio as himself Songs Featured: "Confetti Falling"
67	6	"Big Time Tour Bus"	Carlos PenaVega	Scott Fellows	June 6, 2013	411	1.7
Big Time Rush is on the way to their concert to San Diego, in tour buses, but they get stuck in traffic due to a Tractor Trailer Accident. Kendall is with Carlos, who is filming videos with his camera all the time and Logan is with James and they have roommate problems, as the other three say they can't roommate with Logan and he gets offended, while Kendall finds out a bunch of BTR hater sites and wants to change their opinion about BTR. Meanwhile, Victoria Justice keeps the crowd busy until Big Time Rush shows up and Mrs. Knight and Katie are also stuck in traffic. Guest Stars: Challen Cates as Mrs. Knight, Katelyn Tarver as Jo Special Guest Stars: Victoria Justice as herself Songs Featured: "Crazy for You"
68	7	"Big Time Pranks II"	Jonathan Judge	Lazar Saric	June 13, 2013	406	1.9
Palm Woods' prank wars kick off again, and this time the kids battle the adults. Guest Stars: Katelyn Tarver as Jo, Erin Sanders as Camille, Malese Jow as Lucy, David Cade as Jett, Challen Cates as Mrs. Knight, Matt Riedy as Griffin, David Anthony Higgins as Bitters, Daran Norris as Buddha Bob, Obdul Reid as Obdul Songs featured: "Confetti Falling"
69	8	"Big Time Rides"	Savage Steve Holland	Keith Wagner	June 20, 2013	407	2.2
James buys a motorcycle to try to impress Lucy; Kendall teaches Jo how to drive a stick-shift; Carlos and Logan hold on to a childhood treasure (wood wagon). Guest Starring: Malese Jow as Lucy, Katelyn Tarver as Jo, Challen Cates as Mrs. Knight, Daran Norris as Buddha Bob
70	9	"Big Time Tests"	Savage Steve Holland	Mark Fellows	June 27, 2013	408	1.9
Logan brings Carlos along to the MCAT test as his good luck charm; James is upset because Lucy is off for a European tour and he becomes obsessed with relationship quizzes; Griffin puts on a product testing lab at Rocque Records and asks for Katie, Gustavo and Kelly to test the products for him. Guest Starring: Challen Cates as Mrs. Knight, David Anthony Higgins as Mr. Bitters, Matt Riedy as Griffin and Daran Norris as Buddha Bob Song featured: "Picture This"
71	10	"Big Time Cartoon"	Jonathan Judge	Scott Fellows	July 11, 2013	409	1.9
The boys have been approached by two huge companies that are interested in expanding the BTR brand a little farther. After getting locked out of the studio, they get themselves into a big mix up with the people in downtown LA making them think that they're aliens. Meanwhile, back at the Palm Woods while watching The Fairly OddParents, Buddha Bob ends up falling off his ladder and thinks that he's Cosmo and that he can grant wishes (Daran Norris, the portrayer of Buddha Bob, voices Cosmo in the Fairly OddParents). Guest Starring: Challen Cates as Mrs. Knight, Daran Norris as Buddha Bob, Lorenzo Lamas as Dr. Hollywood, Butch Hartman as himself. Songs Featured: "Song For You"
72	11	"Big Time Break Out"	Jonathan Judge	Nate Knetchel	July 18, 2013	410	2.0
At a party at Rocque Records, celebrating the release of their third studio album, Griffin asks the boys about which one of them is going to leave Big Time Rush and break out. Carlos wants to become a big Broadway hit, Logan becomes a game show host, James has intentions of becoming a solo singer, and Kendall just wants the band to come back together. Guest Stars: Daran Norris as Buddha Bob, Matt Riedy as Arthur Griffin, Challen Cates as Jennifer Knight, Erin Sanders as Camille Roberts. Songs Featured: "Run Wild", "Untouchable"
73	12	"Big Time Dreams"	Savage Steve Holland	Lazar Saric	July 25, 2013	412	2.4
74	13	"Big Time Dreams"	Savage Steve Holland	Scott Fellows	July 25, 2013	413	2.4
The guys are invited to the 24th annual Tween Choice Awards, where the boy banders are nominated and booked to close the show. But before the foursome can take the stage, they uncover an evil plot to brainwash everyone in the audience. So BTR have to take down the bad guys and make sure the show rolls on as scheduled. Guest star: Katelyn Tarver as Jo, Malese Jow as Lucy, Erin Sanders as Camille, Daran Norris as Buddha Bob, David Cade as Jett, Challen Cates as Mrs. Knight, David Anthony Higgins as Bitters, Matt Riedy as Griffin, David Hoffman as Martin Sharkis, Kelli Goss and Savannah Jayde as The Jennifers Special Guest Stars: Austin Mahone as himself, Mindless Behavior as themselves, Nick Cannon as himself, Karmin as themselves, Alexa Vega as herself, Ryan Newman as herself, Eleni Louka as herself. Songs featured: "Get Up", "Run Wild", "We Are", "Big Time Rush"
