= List of Big Time Rush characters =

This is a list of fictional characters in the television series, Big Time Rush. The article deals with main, recurring, minor character and notable guest stars.

== Main characters ==
=== Kendall Knight ===
Kendall Knight (portrayed by Kendall Schmidt) is the leader and founder of Big Time Rush. Originally just wanting to be a professional hockey player, he accepts an offer to move to Los Angeles and record demos only if Gustavo brings James, Carlos, and Logan along to make them all a band. He is portrayed as the glue that keeps the band together. Kendall manages to stay cool under pressure (described as "Cool Rush") and figure out solutions to problems, thus often resulting in the other guys running to Kendall when they have a problem, being the most mature and responsible member of Big Time Rush. Kendall keeps a great relationship with his mother and his younger sister, Katie, who helps him and his friends whenever they get into trouble. He is quite affectionate towards Katie, as she is always there to help him and vice versa.

Kendall is shown to be dating Jo Taylor throughout the series first taking an interest in her in "Big Time Love Song" and eventually becoming a couple in "Big Time Dance." They date happily for a while until Jo gets an offer to go shoot a movie trilogy overseas and break up in "Big Time Break Up" Kendall then starts dating aspiring rockstar Lucy Stone until Jo comes back after the first movie failed causing Kendall to choose between Lucy and Jo; ultimately choosing Jo and dating her throughout the rest of the series.

=== James Diamond ===
James Diamond (portrayed by James Maslow) is the pretty boy of Big Time Rush. He is the one who originally wanted to be a star when the boys were just four hockey players in Minnesota. James is shallow, driven, sometimes an airhead, and, like Logan, sometimes panics under pressure, but is a good friend, and he always looks out for his bandmates. He is the second-to-youngest member of the group before Kendall. James loves wearing bandanas and has an alter-ego known as Bandana-Man, which is just him wrapped in purple bandanas. James always has personal head shots of himself which he carries along, wherever he goes. Of his bandmates, he is closest to Carlos, whom he loves to play video games and goof around with. He is described as solid-voiced and driven beyond belief. Though he is conceited, James can also be caring and think of others. He is shown as a ladies' man going on many dates with various girls throughout the show. He eventually finds a great interest in Lucy Stone (after Kendall gets back together with Jo) and eventually starts dating her in the end.

=== Carlos Garcia ===
Carlos Garcia (portrayed by Carlos Pena Jr.) is the joker of the band who likes to wear a hockey helmet for no apparent reason. According to Kendall, he isn't very tough without it. Carlos is the oldest member of the band, but also the most immature. Due to his childish nature, he is described as innocent, loyal, and kind while also being dim-witted, naive, and impulsive. He almost always tends to rebound quickly from setbacks, with his sudden break up in "Big Time Single" and James revealing his betrayal of throwing away Heather Fox's note saying she liked Carlos in Big Time Secret being rare exceptions. He is also very superstitious, believing in ghosts and the paranormal, as well as being cautious of bringers of bad luck like black cats and broken mirrors. He has dated a few girls throughout the show, but never had an actual girlfriend until the final episode where he gets together with actress Alexa Vega (Pena's actual wife).

=== Logan Mitchell ===
Hortense "Logan" Mitchell (portrayed by Logan Henderson) is the genius and second-in-command of the group. He is genuine and sweet, and the next most down-to-earth guy in the band after Kendall. He is also the serious one but usually follows along in his friend's schemes, sometimes making schemes of his own when needed, like his most famous scheme, 'Love Science'. He is the second oldest of the group after Carlos. Logan is extremely smart and the other guys usually rely on him to solve certain problems, like school work and such. However, he panics under pressure usually leaving it to Kendall to come up with answer. Logan is introduced in "Big Time Audition" as the brain of the group. Logan can be shy but when he lets loose, he can be just as goofy as his friends. Logan's birth name is Hortense, but James' mother doesn't like the name and told the boys to call him Logan, and since no one ever says no to James' mom the name stuck, much to his liking.

Logan is shown to have feelings for Camille right from the beginning and later on they become a couple until "Big Time Girlfriends" where James being his best friend and Camille being his girlfriend kiss. The two decide to remain friends for the time being until they realize they really do love each other and reconcile. They date on and off again throughout the series ending up together in the end.

=== Katie Knight ===
Katie Knight (portrayed by Ciara Bravo) is Kendall's younger sister who is shown to be a lot smarter and quick-witted than her mother. She enjoys blackmailing and likes to gamble. She goes to the Palm Woods School with the boys, after starring in a commercial where all she had to do was beat up a boy. She is originally nine years old in the pilot, later turns 10 in early Season 1 in the series, and turns 11 in the second season. She is very clever and has excellent business senses, which is why the boys often need her for their plans. She is a good sister to Kendall and the boys, helping them out whenever needed. It is shown that the other boys in the band look at Katie as their own little sister too being shown to be very protective of her, seeing her as an unofficial sibling.

=== Gustavo Rocque ===
Gustavo Rocque (portrayed by Stephen Kramer Glickman) is a world-renowned but hot tempered record producer who auditions the boys in Minnesota and brings them to L.A. to make them stars. He is the founder and head of Rocque Records, a division of RCMCBT Global Net Sanyoid Corporation. Before Big Time Rush, he had twenty-nine platinum albums, including ones he made with a previous boy band, Boy Quake.

=== Kelly Wainwright ===
Kelly Wainwright (portrayed by Tanya Chisholm) is a talent scout and Gustavo's assistant. Her personality is a lot mellower than her boss's. She is honest, polite, and very efficient. She is usually the straight woman and the only ones looking out for the band. She is also very helpful and supportive. She serves mainly as moderator/mediator between Gustavo and Big Time Rush, keeping Gustavo's rage in check and simultaneously getting the boys to do what they have to do, avoiding the clashes that would otherwise ensue.

== Secondary characters ==
=== Jo Taylor ===
Josephine "Jo" Taylor (portrayed by Katelyn Tarver) is a new girl at the Palm Woods. Jo is from North Carolina and lives in L.A. with her strict former marine, CIA dad. She is an aspiring singer and actress described as a nice, sweet and normal (compared to the others aspiring actors in Hollywood.) Jo first appears in the episode "Big Time Love Song", where the guys were battling it out to see who would get to date her but none of them got to after she lied she had a boyfriend. Following these events, the other guys moved on and it was only Kendall who insisted on Jo to give him a chance. Though she constantly turned him down, Kendall finally figured out her lie and she started to develop feelings for him. This eventually leads to them soon becoming a couple at the Palm Woods end-of-year school dance in "Big Time Dance." They eventually break up in Big Time Break Up after Jo decides to take a movie deal that shoots abroad for three years leading to the song "Worldwide" as they say goodbye. She returns to L.A. after the test audience for the first movie gave it negative reviews only to find Kendall starting to date another girl, forcing him to choose between the two. Kendall chooses her ultimately and the two are a couple throughout the rest of the series.

=== Jennifer Knight ===
Jennifer Knight (portrayed by Challen Cates) is the mother of Kendall and Katie. She is the adult responsible of Big Time Rush and the only parent to move to live with them. It is seen she gets along very well with Katie and the guys, who respect her and can count on her, as she is proven helpful and both lenient and strict when needed. Despite her gentle personality Mrs. Knight can get really stubborn at times, becoming aggressive and competitive while she can go to the extremes for something she is determined to do and as claimed she likes to win. It is also mentioned that when back to Minnesota she used to be a waitress. Overall, aside from Kendall, she is mostly seen helping and advising Logan who seeks for and respects her opinions.

=== Reginald Bitters (Mr. Bitters) ===
Reginald Bitters (portrayed by David Anthony Higgins) is the strict, money-loving, manager of the Palm Woods. He is also a frenemy with Katie Knight and though they constantly get on each other nerves they seem to care the one for another and occasionally they get along well. Bitters is never helpful at his work and can get lazy as well as arrogant and tries to impose his own rules to others no matter how unfair they may be, though he gets usually outsmarted by either Katie or the guys.

=== Arthur Griffin ===
Arthur Griffin (portrayed by Matt Riedy) is the CEO of conglomerate RCMCBT Global Net Sanyoid Corporation, which owns Rocque Records. He tends to have irrational demands from Gustavo and Big Time Rush to be fulfilled in a short period of time that they always just barely reach. He is also known to make spur-of-the-moment decisions. On numerous occasions, he has threatened to shut down Big Time Rush or otherwise handicap it.

=== Camille Roberts ===
Camille Roberts (portrayed by Erin Sanders) is known as the "Method Actress Queen" of the Palm Woods and can always be seen practicing her lines around the pool before her auditions. Camille is best friends with Jo. In "Big Time Party", she wanted Logan to audition for a role in her "fantasy dream movie". Logan rejected the idea at first, but came back to play in her "movie" and soon began to grow feelings for her. But soon Logan had to balance her date with Mercedes' and, after Camille discovered this, she and Mercedes threw him into the pool, then agreed to dance with him but not to talk to him for a week, showing that she was really cool. Logan acknowledging his feelings for Camille, he dressed up as a prince and rode in on a fake horse to ask her to be his date for the dance. In the film, Big Time Concert, it appeared as if the boys were leaving after Griffin dumped them. After seeing Kendall and Jo kiss good-bye, Logan asked for something to remember Camille. As he leaned in to kiss her, she slapped him. Later on, when the boys came back and had to find James, Logan accidentally blurted out "Camille" instead of James, showing he missed her during their time apart. In the episode "Big Time Girlfriends", James and Camille kissed when they caught up with the acting while practicing some lines, although James claimed that Camille is not his type earlier in "Big Time Dance". This led Logan and Camille to break up and remain good friends even though they still have feelings for each other. In the episode, "Big Time Returns", Logan and Camille get back together again.

=== Freight Train ===
Freight Train (portrayed by Stephen Keys) is Gustavo's personal enforcer and bodyguard. He is muscular and able to lift all the boys up at once, but also likes the boys. A play on his name, any time he appears a train whistle is heard in the background track. According to Gustavo, he is in charge of making people do what he says. Although usually portraying an intimidating and serious personality, he has a kind and caring heart towards others including Gustavo.

=== Mr. X ===
Mr. X (portrayed by Fred Tallaksen) is the dance instructor for Gustavo's bands, as well as various other music groups. He frequently uses words that start with the letter 'X', and he has choreographed for Boy-Quake and Boys in the Attic, two of Gustavo's boy bands, as well as Madonna, Beyoncé, and Yo Gabba Gabba.

=== Tyler Duncan ===
Tyler Duncan (portrayed by Tucker Albrizzi) is a red-haired, chubby kid who, because of his mom, stars in the Juice Box commercials, although he really only wants to be a normal kid. He goes to the Palm Woods School with Katie and the boys. His mother is obsessed with his acting career, and with the help of Katie and the boys he is able to hide from her.

=== Mrs. Duncan ===
Mrs. Duncan (portrayed by Alyssa Preston) is Tyler's mom and she's obsessed with his acting career. She always wants to put him in commercials, and in the episode Big Time Break she tried to put him in a diaper commercial. With the help of Katie and the boys, Tyler is able to hide from her.

=== Guitar Dude ===
Guitar Dude (portrayed by Barnett O'Hara) is a teenage songwriter trying to make it in Hollywood and lives at the Palm Woods, home of aspiring child stars. He usually does the background music when the boys are at the pool. In Big Time Fever it was stated that he was a former cello player before he got Hollywood Fever.

=== Buddha Bob ===
Buddha Bob (portrayed by Daran Norris) is the grounds keeper and janitor at the Palm Woods. He is a tall, lumberjack-like man who looks like he hasn't shaved in a while and despite his fierce looks is actually very nice. He soon enough befriended the whole "Big Time Rush family" (with the guys claiming to like him, such as Carlos in Big Time Break) and especially Katie Knight, each other since his first appearance in "Big Time Bad Boy".

=== Miss Collins ===
Miss Collins (portrayed by Tara Strong) is the teacher at the Palm Woods school. She is very nice and sweet and even has class outside once in a while. She debuted in Big Time School of Rocque. When the boys found out they were going to the School of Rocque (a parody of School of Rock) instead of the Palm Woods school, they kept dreaming up fantasies about the Palm Woods school, like having water fights for homework and eating pie and Miss Collins having class outside everyday and she being the greatest teacher in history. When Gustavo cracked and let them go to the Palm Woods school, they were very excited at first. But when they entered the room and Miss Collins said they were going to talk about water displacement, James, Kendall, and Logan started squirting water around the room and Carlos stuffed his face in pie. When they saw an annoyed Miss Collins, they realized that school was a lot more fun in their fantasies, and they got detention.

=== The Jennifers ===
The Jennifers (Denyse Tontz as Jennifer 1; Spencer Locke in the early Season 1 episodes/Kelli Goss in the later Season 1 episodes and onwards as Jennifer 2; and Savannah Jayde as Jennifer 3) are three self-absorbed girls with the same name that live and go to school at the Palm Woods who sing, dance, and act. Kendall, James, Logan, and Carlos fall for them but the girls won't date them until they become famous. In time, however, they have become more like friends to the boys as the series progresses, but Carlos still has interest in them.

=== Jett Stetson ===
Jett Stetson (portrayed by David Cade) is portrayed as a cocky, self-centered actor who appears in Welcome Back, Big Time and plays a character in the television show New Town High alongside Jo. He has to kiss Jo's character. As Kendall gets suspicious about it, Katie and Bitters both tell him that Jett looks way better than he does. He has dated all his co-stars, and Kendall tries to sabotage his kiss scene with Jo to the point where it almost costs him his relationship with her. Jett does not like Kendall and often insults his looks, calling his face odd.

=== Lucy Stone ===
Lucille "Lucy" Stone (portrayed by Malese Jow) is a new girl at the Palm Woods and secondary love interest for Kendall, first appearing in Big Time Rocker. She is a rock artist and holds a "rock" appearance and attitude. She's also smart, funny and has a sharp wit. Lucy moved into Apartment 3B, (which was a small apartment about the size of a utility closet) in which the guys often like and tend to hang out in. Sometime later in the fourth season, Lucy falls in love with James, though she goes on tour before she can tell him. In "Big Time Dreams", she gets into an argument with James about leaving without saying goodbye. During the award for best kiss, it's revealed that she truly does like James and came back because of him, which leads to them finally sharing their first kiss and becoming a couple.

=== Hawk ===
Cyrzs Z. Hawk (portrayed by Phil LaMarr) is Gustavo's arch-rival and owner of Hawk Records, as well as the main antagonist in the first season. He appears in the episode Big Time Sparks, where he is determined to drag Jordin Sparks, who makes a special guest appearance, away from "Rocque Records" and to that end, sends Gustavo a package with a live skunk in it in order to ruin the studio and convincing Jordin to record her new single with him instead. Fortunately, the boys manage to catch it, saving both Kelly and Gustavo, who comes up with a brilliant plan to get back at him.

=== Lightning The TV Wonder Dog ===
Lightning The TV Wonder Dog (portrayed by dog actor Morgan) is a celebrity dog that lives in the Palmwoods. He has appeared in many episodes as a background character. In the Halloween special - Big Time Halloween, he steals Logan's arm and Logan chases after him.

=== Dr. Hollywood ===
Dr. Hollywood (portrayed by Lorenzo Lamas) is the Palm Woods doctor. He is dramatic and appears in many episodes. Logan loves helping the doc out.

== Minor characters ==
=== Obdul ===
Obdul (portrayed by Obdul Reid) is Griffin's personal bodyguard and assistant. He is always wearing a business suit and carries a black leather briefcase at all times. A running gag is Griffin saying something assaulting and Obdul tapping his briefcase.

=== Jessica ===
Jessica is Griffin's personal bodyguard and assistant. She is always wearing a business suit.

=== Joanna Mitchell ===
Joanna Mitchell (portrayed by Holly Wortell) is a real estate agent and Logan Mitchell's mother. She convinced James's mother to let him stay in L.A. by finding a place for her to open up an office on the West Coast, thus allowing her to see her son at least once a month.

=== Sylvia Garcia ===
Sylvia Garcia (portrayed by Jill-Michele Melean) is an IT systems analyst and Carlos Garcia's mother. She convinced James's mother to let him stay in L.A. by setting up the boys' apartment with a T1 line and by setting up the computers with Facetalk, thus allowing Brooke to see James virtually whenever she wanted.

=== Officer Garcia ===
Mr. Garcia (portrayed by Erik Estrada) is a policeman and Carlos's father. He becomes fierce and overprotective when someone messes with his son.

=== Sasha ===
Natasha "Sasha" (portrayed by Chelsea Ricketts) is Carlos's "girlfriend". She is hired by Gustavo to pretend to like Carlos so when they "break up" his heart will be broken and can relate and sing the break-up song better.

=== Brooke Diamond ===
Brooke Diamond (portrayed by Lisa Rinna) is James Diamond's mom who appears in Big Time Moms. She wants to take James home so he could become the future CEO of her cosmetics company. It is revealed she misses him so much that Carlos's, Logan's and Kendall's mothers set up ways for her to still see James and keep in touch with him.

=== Marcos Del Posey ===
Marcos (portrayed by Carlos Alazraqui) is the Italian #1 teen photographer in the world, according to Gustavo. He appears in "Big Time Photo Shoot" where he takes their first photo. It was all good at first, until Griffin ruined a simple shot with the theme of "Space Matadors". However, the boys somehow got rid of him and Gustavo took the photo. He re-appears in Big Time Video, where he is determined to become the director of their upcoming music video "The City Is Ours". He eventually gets the part and is praised by Gustavo.

=== Jenny Tinkler ===
Jennifer "Jenny" Tinkler (portrayed by Sammy Jay Wren) is the boy's clumsy hometown friend from high school in Minnesota. She makes a brief appearance in Big Time Audition, angry at Gustavo for scolding her audition while being held and thrown out by security. She returns in the episode "Big Time Fans", where she is revealed to have been banned from Palm Woods after inadvertently causing three fires and an explosion. Jenny ends up joining the band Death Smash as a replacement for Johnny.

=== Fujisaki ===
Fujisaki (portrayed by Koji Kataoka) is the head owner of RCM CBT Global Net Sanyoid.

=== Stephanie King ===
Stephanie (portrayed by Tristin Mays) is a third "new girl" at the "Palm Woods" who the boys liked in the episode "Big Time Terror" and was later discovered to be the Palm Woods ghost. She helped the boys get rid of Gustavo from their apartment in exchange for them keeping her low-budget horror movie a secret from Mr. Bitters and her father.

=== Kyle ===
Kyle (portrayed by Jerry Phillips) is Katie's crush who appeared in Big Time Crush. In the episode, he went on a date with Katie to originally see Kiss and Tell, but ended up staying in the arcade due to Kyle grossed out seeing people kissing. He never appeared again.

=== Atticus Moon ===
Sir Atticus Moon (Trevor Devall) is a billionaire who owns various businesses across Britain and possibly the world. He believes all the worlds problems stem from its leaders and their disagreements and thus plots to take over the world using a gravity defying device called "The Beetle" to shift the Moon out of orbit causing natural disasters to strong arm world leaders into giving into his demands. The Beetle is stolen by British spy Simon Lane, who switches it into Kendall's bag. Shortly later Simon is kidnapped and the boys find out about the Beetle. The boys team up with Simon's daughter Penny to save Simon from Moon, but the negotiation goes wrong. The boys agree to help hunt Moon down to clear Simon's name, but Moon has Katie abducted. That night, the boys and Penny race to Moon's mansion and fight his guards as Moon initiates his plan. The boys thwart the plan but Moon immediately takes Katie hostage again demanding they give him The Beetle. Kendall reluctantly tosses the Beetle to him and Katie steps on his foot, causing the beetle to latch onto his jacket, causing Moon to float away.

=== Penny Lane ===
Penelope "Penny" Lane (portrayed by Emma Lahana) is Simon Lane's daughter who was a trained spy by her father. In Big Time Movie, when her father goes rogue, she sets out to find a device called "The Beetle" that ended up in Kendall's possession. She breaks into their room to steal the device back, and after realizing they are now wanted by the British government, the boys later teams up with the Penny into saving her abducted father in exchange for the Beetle.

=== Simon Lane ===
A secret British agent who realized the evil plans of Sir Atticus Moon and went rogue to disrupt him. He steals an anti-gravity device known as "The Beetle" and carries it in a rather girlish bag and switches it with Kendall's equally girlish bag (a gift from a fan) and is abducted by Moon's henchmen. The boys team up with Simon's daughter Penny to rescue him, but the deal goes wrong. Simon notes that the boys are now public enemy because they were caught with the Beetle in their possession, so Simon promises to have the boys' names cleared if they help him deal with Moon, but Simon ends up getting tranquilized by Logan's mistake. He remains unconscious until the boys defeat Moon and Simon makes good on his promise.

== Guest stars ==
=== Snoop Dogg ===
Snoop Dogg makes a guest appearance in the episode "Big Time Christmas".

=== Miranda Cosgrove ===
Miranda Cosgrove makes a guest appearance in the episode "Big Time Christmas".

=== Elizabeth Gillies ===
Heather Fox (portrayed by Elizabeth Gillies) appears in the episode "Big Time Secret". She is a famous model who went to a camp with Carlos and James Diamond. Carlos had a crush on Heather who also turned out to like him and tells James to give him a note that said she liked him but he does not because he is in love with her too. James told Carlos about this years later but now Carlos claims that James broke a friendship code and to fix it, James recreates the camp so that Heather and Carlos can re-live their old camp days. Heather, instead of falling for Carlos, fell in love with James and tells Carlos to give him a note that said she liked him. Carlos decides to give it to James but, James declined and said that their friendship is more important.

=== Jordin Sparks ===
Jordin Sparks make her guest appearance in "Big Time Sparks", where she is recording a song at Rocque Records. Gustavo tell the boys to stay away from Jordin, calling them "Bad Luck Rush". Later Kendall saves Jordin and Jo see them together and thinks they are in love. Also James break his mirror getting bad luck looking for a four leaf clover. Carlos and Logan see all this bad luck and they want to protect Jordin. Kendall makes a girly lunch for Jo but Jordin is saved by Kendall again. Jo once again see this and walks away angrily. Later Jordin is pushed down a well after all the boys get in the well after many attempts to get they figure out the song and call Freight Train there is also a skunk who Gustavo and Kelly are getting rid of. The boys catch the skunk. Jordin says she wants a duet with BTR they do a duet and then they trick Hawk. Kelly points out many good things about the boys that has happened to Gustavo such as recording the song with Jordin. The song was "count on me". He admits they are his good luck charm but only tells Kelly he says if he tells the boys they will mess it up. When Jordin packs up after completing her work with Gustavo, her younger brother PJ helps carry her bags, much to his chagrin.

=== Chris Masters ===
Chris Masters makes a guest appearance in the episode "Big Time School of Rocque". He is one of the teachers hired to discipline the boys and forces the boys to do grueling jobs.

=== Fabio ===
Fabio Lanzoni first appears in "Big Time Dance", where Mrs. Knight would only go out with Fabio on a dance and Katie convinces Fabio to go to the dance with her mother. Fabio later appears in the episodes "Big Time Christmas" and "Bel Air Rush".
