= The Den (2013 film) =

- Russian theatrical release poster
- Directed by: Zachary Donohue
- Written by: Zachary Donohue; Lauren Thompson
- Story by: Zachary Donohue
- Starring: Melanie Papalia; Matt Riedy; David Schlachtenhaufen
- Cinematography: Bernard Hunt
- Edited by: Joseph Pettinati
- Music by: Evan Goldman; Zachary Donohue
- Production companies: Cliffbrook Films; Onset Films
- Distributed by: IFC Midnight
- Release dates: December 23, 2013 (Russia); March 14, 2014 (United States)
- Running time: 81 minutes
- Country: United States
- Language: English
- Budget: $500,000

The Den (released in some countries as Hacked) is a 2013 American found footage horror film directed by Zachary Donohue in his feature directorial debut. Starring Melanie Papalia, the film follows a graduate student who, while conducting research on an online chat platform, becomes the target of a network of killers who broadcast murders as part of a black-market website.

First released in Russia on December 23, 2013, under the title Смерть в сети (Death Online), the film received a simultaneous limited theatrical and video-on-demand release in the United States on March 14, 2014, through IFC Midnight. The Den explores themes of social media, computer hacking, voyeurism, the deep web, and filmed killings presented in the style of snuff films.

== Plot ==
Elizabeth Benton, a sociology graduate student, uses a social media site called The Den for her thesis project, aiming to measure how many meaningful conversations she can have with strangers online. With help from her friend Sally on the graduate board, she secures a reluctant grant and spends months chatting on the platform, despite concerns from her boyfriend Damien and friends Jenni and Max. Most chats end quickly, but she gathers ample data and remains optimistic.

Elizabeth's account is soon hacked. Her webcam activates without her consent, and a hostile stranger repeatedly tries to contact her. One night, her webcam secretly records her and Damien having sex, and the video is leaked to her graduate board. Later, she witnesses a masked man murdering a young woman live on The Den. The police suspect a hoax, and Max's attempts to trace the hacker fail due to extensive proxy routing.

Damien is abducted during a video chat, and Jenni is later lured to Elizabeth's house by someone posing as her. Jenni is found with fatal wrist wounds in an apparent staged suicide, while the leaked sex video causes Elizabeth's grant to be suspended. The hacker then targets Elizabeth's pregnant sister Lynn, sending disturbing footage of intruders entering her home. Though police surround the property, an attacker posing as an officer retrieves the camera, revealing inside knowledge or infiltration of law enforcement.

Elizabeth's friends are picked off one by one. She watches Max murdered on-screen, while Damien's fate remains uncertain. Returning home, she finds her police protection compromised and kills a masked intruder hiding in her closet, only to be captured outside by another assailant.

Elizabeth wakes chained inside an abandoned building, a camera stapled to her forehead. She is forced to chat with Damien, who warns that their captors are part of a larger network. She watches a video of Max being suffocated and sees Damien dragged away to his presumed death. When one attacker enters her cell to kill her, Elizabeth strangles him with her chain, escapes her restraints, and flees through the dark complex armed only with a hammer.

As she fights her way out, Elizabeth interrogates a young captor, who admits Damien is not there. She surfaces, hijacks a getaway car, but crashes after being rammed by another vehicle. The killers drag her back underground.

The film shifts to Brianne, another Den user who earlier chatted with Elizabeth. Brianne receives a video showing Elizabeth being hanged and shot, revealed to be part of a black-market website selling snuff films staged as "narratives" of victims hunted through The Den. A man browsing the site prepares to purchase Brianne's "narrative" before being interrupted by his young son.

== Cast ==
- Melanie Papalia as Elizabeth "Liz" Benton
- David Schlachtenhaufen as Damien
- Adam Shapiro as Max
- Anna Margaret Hollyman as Lynn Benton
- Matt Riedy as Sgt. Tisbert
- Katija Pevec as Jenni
- Saidah Arrika Ekulona as Sally
- Anthony Jennings as Officer Dawson
- Victoria Hanlin as Brianne

== Reception ==
On the review aggregator website Rotten Tomatoes, 75% of 24 critics' reviews are positive, with an average rating of 6/10. Metacritic gives the film a weighted average of 48/100 based on 6 critics, indicating "mixed or average reviews".

Fearnet gave The Den a positive review, commenting that it "starts out a little rocky but if you're not completely fed up with 'found footage' filmmaking by now and you're willing to give a non-traditional visual presentation a fair shot, The Den has some pretty compelling things to say about the alleged safety of the internet." In contrast, Shock Till You Drop panned the movie as it felt that it "lacks true scares, awesome kills or even the routine flash of nudity to warrant any sort of viewing. It panders a silly and over exaggerated message of the dangers of the anonymity of the internet and the 'nature' of people. It uses a silly plot to carry a ridiculous camera technique and delivers nothing but angst and irritation." Fangoria criticized the film for many of the same reasons, as it felt that the movie began on a strong note but became "inauthentic and irritating" after the film depicted "Almost everyone, online or not, responds to [the main character's troubles] with immediate hostility or disbelief."

== Possible sequel ==
In a 2022 interview with Bloody Disgusting Donohue stated “What I've been thinking of lately is a Den sequel where I think it would follow a little bit more of what the screen life movies are doing where we're using all the apps, cause now we know that you can do that! And like, put in a lot of easter eggs of The Den for the people that are fans of that, but follow a similar story structure and update it for the modern times.”

In 2023, Papilla posted a photo on instagram with Donohue with the caption “Look who's reunited. 9 years ago today The Den was released, so what could me and the director be doing…who likes a sequel?”

== See also ==
- List of films featuring surveillance
- Unfriended
- Unfriended: Dark Web
