= Big Time Break-Up =

- Big Time Rush episode
- Episode no.: Season 2 Episode 16
- Directed by: Stewart Schill (Big Time Break-Up); Savage Steve Holland (Big Time Single)
- Written by: Lazar Saric (Big Time Break-Up); Mark Fellows, Keith Wagner (Big Time Single)
- Production code: 218–219
- Original air dates: June 25, 2011 (Big Time Break-Up); July 23, 2011 (Big Time Single)
- Running time: 42 min. (runtime)

Episode chronology
← Previous "Big Time Prom Kings"	Next → "Big Time Wedding"

Big Time Break-Up is a two-part television special of the Nickelodeon television series, Big Time Rush. The first part, "Big Time Break-Up", aired on June 25, 2011 and the second and final part, "Big Time Single", aired on July 23, 2011. The special marked the temporary departure of Katelyn Tarver as Jo Taylor.

== Plot ==
=== Big Time Break-Up ===
Kendall, Logan, Carlos, and James are sitting and talking about Jo getting a role in a film. Someone then calls and tells Jo she has gotten the part but it is to be filmed in New Zealand for three years (the movie is implied to be a trilogy). Kendall then becomes upset and soon finds out by Jo in the lobby that she turned down the part because she was unable to get out of her contract with Newtown High, and Kendall performs a "happy dance" until being informed by Katie that she had chosen not to take the role by choice. Kendall is then told by Katie that this is putting too much pressure on himself and that he needs to go on a date with Jo and be disgusting so they can break-up. On their date, Kendall does many gross things such as stabbing a guy with a fork by performing a "fork chop". Jo breaks up with him and walks away, leaving Kendall feeling upset. Katie does her best to cheer him up in the meantime. Soon, Jo stops by and tells Kendall she knows that he just acted disgusting at the date so she would choose to take the movie role. Kendall convinces her to call her manager and take the part, which she does. Outside at Jo's limo, she and Kendall hug and Kendall gives her an inflated dog balloon. She then leaves in the limo. Meanwhile, Logan and Kelly try to steal Carlos's helmet after he wears it during several photo shoots. Carlos eventually tells them that he will take his helmet off during photo shoots and dinner. James also meets a Latin pop singer Selana and, as she is only in town for three days, has a complete relationship in those three days. Back at the apartment, the guys come to cheer up Kendall and Carlos points out that Kendall will never forget the goodbye kiss Jo and Kendall shared. Kendall then remembers that he and Jo just had a goodbye hug and not kiss, so he and the guys run down to LAX as fast as they can. They get there just in time and Kendall and Jo share their goodbye kiss and Jo walks away to get on the plane, all while Big Time Rush perform their new song, "Worldwide". Kendall then looks at Jo's plane fly away and the boys all pat his back in comfort as they leave the airport.

=== Big Time Single ===
Kendall is depressed that Jo left him to go to New Zealand, so James, Carlos and Logan try to cheer Kendall up by doing the things when he was single and they also have to get Kendall ready for Big Time Rush's new summer single. Kendall comes out of his heartbreak long enough to inform them (by shouting) that until they all have girlfriends and lose them in an instant, he will not open up to them since they do not yet know what he is going through. Thus, Logan goes to Camille for help, who asks him on a date before dumping him. Carlos meets a girl in the Palmwoods Park, who he simply refers to as the "Red-shirted girl", and goes out with her for twelve minutes. James asks Jennifer 2 (Blond Jennifer) out, and at the end of their "relationship", instead of he dumping her, she dumps him. Because James has never been dumped before and thus is heartbroken that she ruined his 'perfect record'. Carlos tearfully consoles James, telling him he knows what he is going through. Logan appears and asks what is going on and his heartbroken friends explain they've both been dumped. Kendall arrives at that moment and apologizes to his friends for snapping at them earlier, only to have both boys break down emotionally in his arms.

Meanwhile, Gustavo has writer's block while writing the band's summer single, and Katie, who helped cure his previous writer's block in Big Time Love Song, comes in to help him by suggesting various tactics to help him channel summer. Later, as Logan explains to a shocked Kendall what he and the boys did for him, he says he remembered what his friends had told him earlier and snapped out of his heartbreak, and Kendall and Logan try to get James and Carlos back on their feet, but fail. Gustavo comes up with a breakup song and has the boys sing it in front of Griffin, but since Kendall, James and Carlos are still heartbroken and James and Carlos are still tearful, it sounds horrible. Griffin then warns them that if they do not give him a summer single that 'rules the world' and has the word 'beach' in it, he will divert their funds to another company division. Gustavo orders Kendall and Logan to cheer up James and Carlos and make them stop crying so they can sing again and Katie to help him fix his writer's block. Kendall comes up with the idea that if Carlos can find the Red-shirted girl so he can see her one last time, it would snap him out of his heartbreak. Logan takes Carlos to Palmwoods Park, where he met her for the first time, but they can not find her. Then Carlos remembers she smelled like chili-cheese fries, which gives Logan the idea to check the Palmwoods registry so they can check all the apartments that got them delivered that day. However, they still can not find her.

Quickly getting another idea, Logan calls for an order of chili-cheese fries to be delivered to 2J. Meanwhile, Kendall helps James try to get Jennifer 2 back so he can dump her this time. Jennifer 2 agrees if she gets Katie's leather jacket, which Kelly forces a reluctant Katie to give to her. James then dumps Jennifer 2 and is cured, and Katie finally tells Gustavo to just call the song 'Rule the World' and not have anything about girls or heartbreak in it.

James, Kendall, and Gustavo return to the apartment to find Carlos still sobbing. However, Logan ordered him chili-cheese fries, and when they arrive, it is revealed that the deliveryman is actually the 'red-shirted girl'. Once Carlos sees her, he is cured of heartbreak. Unfortunately, James accidentally picks the wrong moment to mention Jo's name, which sends Kendall back into a state of depression. But Gustavo says his summer song is the perfect cure for Kendall's heartache. The boys then sing the song 'If I Ruled the World', which Griffin likes and finally helps Kendall recover from breaking up with Jo. In the end, though, only Katie is left with heartbreak, since she lost her leather jacket to Jennifer 2 while trying to help James recover from his heartbreak.

== Reception ==
The first part, "Big Time Break-Up", drew in over 3.6 million viewers, while the second part, "Big Time Single", earned over 3.1 million.

== International release dates ==
Country	Channel	Date
USA	Nick	June 25, 2011
Australia & New Zealand	Nick (Australia)	November 19, 2011
UK & Ireland	Nick (UK & Ireland)	December 17, 2011
South East Asia	Nick (South East Asia)	December 4, 2011
Canada	Nick (Canada)	October 17, 2011
Lithuanian	LNK	June 3, 2013
