= Tucker Albrizzi =

American actor (born 2000)

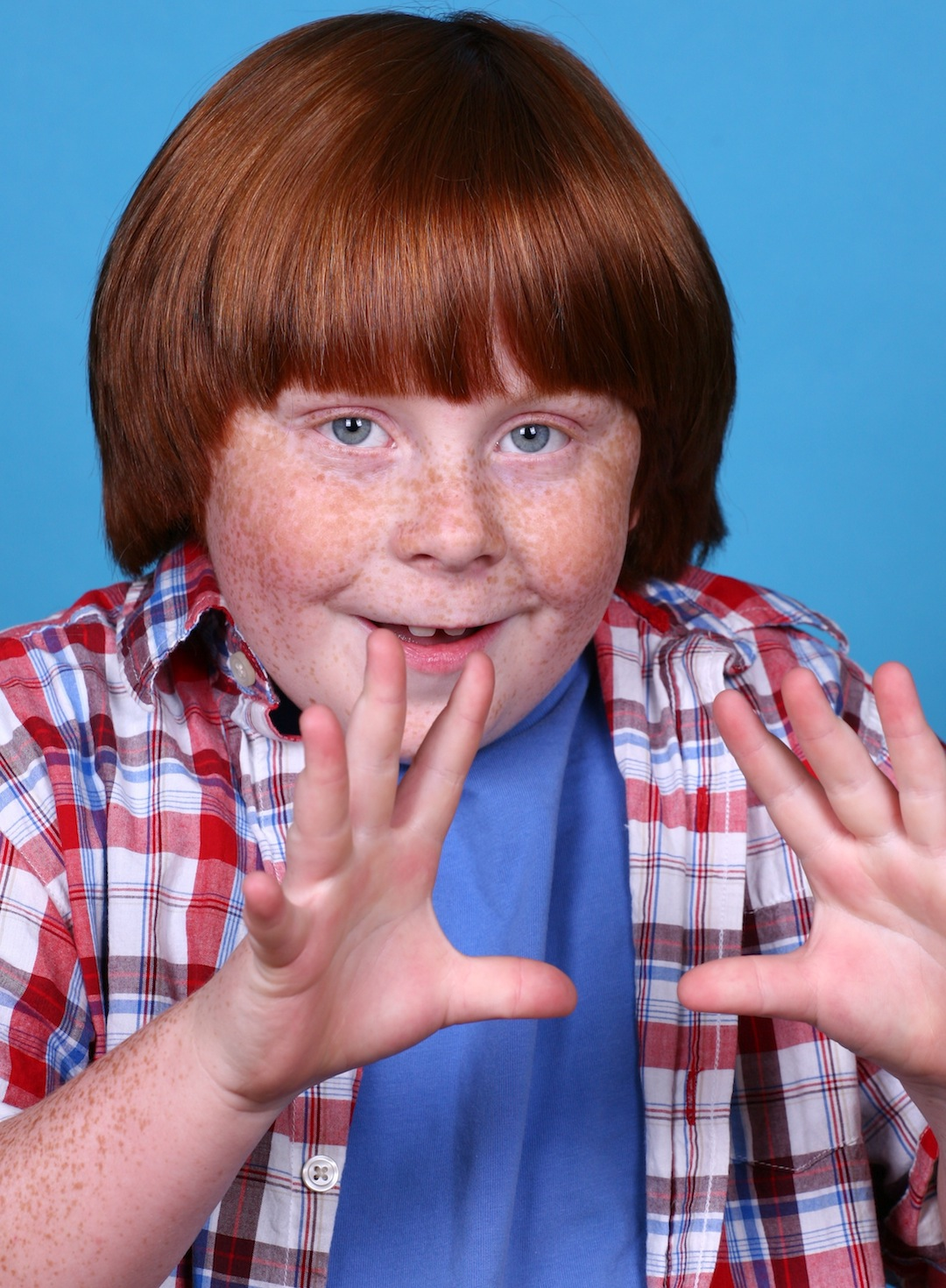
- Albrizzi in 2010
- Born: February 25, 2000 (age 26); Palm Harbor, Florida, U.S.
- Occupation: Actor
- Years active: 2007–present
- Spouse(s): Kasi Zimmermann (2016–present; engaged)

Tucker Albrizzi (born February 25, 2000) is an American actor. He is best known for his roles as Tyler Duncan on Big Time Rush, Jake on Good Luck Charlie, Randall Snyder on American Vandal and Colin McConnell on A.P. Bio. He has appeared in the movies I Am Number Four, Bridesmaids, Sicko, Alvin and the Chipmunks: Chipwrecked, and ParaNorman.

== Early life ==
Albrizzi was born on February 25, 2000 and raised in Palm Harbor, Florida, the son of Claudine (née Andrews) and Keith Albrizzi.

== Career ==
He began acting in commercials in Orlando, Florida in 2007 when he was 7 years old. His brother Patrick was diagnosed with leukemia later that year and created a charity called Driving for Donors, which adds marrow donors to the Be The Match National Marrow Donor Program. Albrizzi and his family spent the next year traveling the country in an RV holding marrow drives for Driving For Donors. He came to Los Angeles in 2008 to be in a documentary with Patrick about Driving For Donors and decided to try acting in Hollywood. Albrizzi and his brother appeared together in Michael Moore's Sicko and as guests on The Late Late Show with Craig Ferguson.

Within 2 months of arriving in Hollywood, Albrizzi booked his first series regular role in Bless This Mess. In 2009, he was cast in the recurring role of Tyler on Big Time Rush. Later that year, he was also cast in the recurring role of Jake, Gabe's best friend, on Good Luck Charlie and guest starred on many other TV shows as well.

In 2010, Albrizzi began acting in movies with appearances in Bridesmaids, I Am Number Four, and Treasure Buddies. In 2011, he was originally cast in Ted in the role of Robert, but he was unable to film because of scheduling conflicts with his work on the Disney XD pilot Pack of Wolves. In the same year, he also got a role as the Kite Kid in Alvin and the Chipmunks: Chipwrecked.

In 2016, Albrizzi co-starred in the science fiction action film Monster Trucks. In 2017, he starred in the feature film, Bully, as the lead character Jimmy Mulligan. Albrizzi also played the recurring role of Terry in 10 episodes of the YouTube series Foursome. He also appeared as Randall Snyder in the first 4 episodes of the Netflix series American Vandal. Albrizzi appears in all 13 episodes of the first season of A.P. Bio, as Colin McConnell. He plays Walter Dobbs in all 10 episodes of the first season of Mr. Iglesias on Netflix.

=== Voiceover work ===
Albrizzi began voice acting with 2012's ParaNorman, in the role of Neil. He was also the voice of Budderball in Treasure Buddies (replacing Josh Flitter from the first Air Buddies) and played the live-action role of Budderball's owner Bartleby in the movies.

== Personal life ==
Albrizzi began dating scientist Kasi Zimmermann in January 2016. They became engaged on June 11, 2023, after seven years of dating.

== Filmography ==
=== Movies ===
Year	Title	Role	Notes
2007	Sicko	Himself	
2011	Alvin and the Chipmunks: Chipwrecked	Kite Kid	
2011	Bridesmaids	Skating Kid	
2011	Spooky Buddies	Bartleby	Direct-to-video
2011	Hop	Bat Boy	
2011	I Am Number Four	Tuck	
2012	Treasure Buddies	Budderball	Direct-to-video
2012	ParaNorman	Neil (voice)	
2016	Monster Trucks	Sam Geldon	
2018	Bully	Jimmy Mulligan	

=== Television ===
Year	Title	Role	Notes
2008–2009	The Late Late Show with Craig Ferguson	The Critics	2 episode
2009	The Jay Leno Show	Flunker	1 episode
2009	Bless This Mess	Michael	TV movie
2009	The Office	Son	Episode: "Mafia"
2009–2011	Big Time Rush	Tyler	11 episodes
2010	Desperate Housewives	Little Bully	Episode: "The Thing That Counts Is What's Inside"
2010	Brothers & Sisters	Kid Playinig Tybalt	Episode: "A Righteous Kiss"
2010	Tim and Eric Awesome Show, Great Job!	I-Jammer Kid #1	Episode: "Puberty"
2010	Dark Blue	Marky	Episode: "Liar's Poker"
2010	Mike & Molly	Tucker	Episode: "Pilot"
2010–2013	Good Luck Charlie	Jake	6 episodes
2010, 2015	Childrens Hospital	Kid	Episode: "Give a Painted Brother a Break"
2010, 2015	Childrens Hospital	Terry	Episode: "Koontz Is Coming"
2011	Pack of Wolves	Darwin Oppenheimer	TV movie
2012	Lab Rats	Gordo	Episodes: "Death Spiral Smackdown"
2012	Zeke and Luther	Fish Belly	Episode: "There's No Business Like Bro Business"
2012	Shmagreggie Saves the World	Shmagreggie	TV movie
2013	Wendell & Vinnie	Andrew	Episodes: "Vinnie & the Man Crush" and "Wendell and Vinnie's"
2014	Enlisted	Kenny Shifflet	Episode: "Parade Duty"
2014	Take 2	Gary / Cameron	3 episodes
2016	The Big Bang Theory	Christopher	Episode: "The Fetal Kick Catalyst"
2017	Trial & Error	Hackille O'Neal	Episode: "A Hostile Jury"
2017	Foursome	Terry	Main role (season 3), 10 episodes
2017	American Vandal	Randall Snyder	Episode: "Growing Suspicion"
2017	Dimension 404	Dennis	Episode: "Polybius"
2018	A.P. Bio	Colin McConnell	Recurring role, 13 episodes
2019–2020	Mr. Iglesias	Walt	Main role (season 2), recurring role (season 1)

== Awards and nominations ==
- 32nd Young Artist Awards
  - Best Guest Star Performance in a TV Series – Good Luck Charlie (Won)
  - Best Recurring Performance in a TV Series – Big Time Rush (Nominated)
- 33rd Young Artist Awards
  - Best Performance in a TV Series – Guest Starring Young Actor Ten and Under – Big Time Rush (Nominated)
  - Best Performance in a DVD Film – Young Ensemble Cast – Spooky Buddies (Won)
