= Matt Riedy =

American actor

- Born: Buffalo, New York, U.S.
- Occupation: Actor
- Years active: 1991–present

Matt Riedy is an American actor. He was born in Buffalo, New York. He moved to Los Angeles in 2005 and Atlanta in 2019 with his wife.

== Career ==
Riedy has stated that he most often plays "Cops, doctors, lawyers, businesspeople, [and] people in charge".

In 2013, he starred in the slasher film The Den and the following year he starred alongside Robert Downey Jr. in The Judge. He appeared in the two-episode Season 5 finale of Modern Family. In 2016, he played Dr. Mayes in General Hospital until the character was killed off after 10 episodes.

== Filmography ==
=== Film ===
Year	Title	Role	Ref.
2013	The Den	Sergeant Tisbert	
2014	The Judge	Sheriff White	
2018	Book Club	General Kain	
2019	I Am That Man	Adam Lloyd	
2022	Agent Game	CIA Deputy Director	
2025	Violent Ends	Ray Frost	

=== Television ===
Year	Title	Role	Notes	Reference
2006	Vanished	Agent Sloane	Episodes: "Drop" and "Resurrection"	
2007	Ugly Betty	Mr. Klein	Episode: "How Betty Got Her Grieve Back"	
2008, 2012	Mad Men	Henry Wofford	Episodes: "Flight 1"	
2008, 2012	Mad Men	Henry Lammott	Episode: "A Little Kiss"	
2009–2013	Big Time Rush	Arthur Griffin	31 episodes	
2012	Community	Professor #1	Episode: "Curriculum Unavailable"	
2012	NCIS: Los Angeles	Victor Potter	Episode: "Collateral"	
2012	Holly's Holiday	Mike	TV movie	
2013	Raising Hope	Scotch Wilkinson	Guest Cameo Episode: Lord of the Ring	
2014	Modern Family	Howard	Episode: "The Wedding"	
2016	General Hospital	Matthew Mayes	10 episodes	
2019	Shameless	Charles	Episode: "Citizen Carl"	
2020	Swagger	Frank	3 episodes	

=== Video games ===
Year	Title	Role	Reference
2011	Marvel vs. Capcom 3: Fate of Two Worlds	Mike Haggar	
2011	Ultimate Marvel vs. Capcom 3	Mike Haggar	
2012	Diablo III	Additional voices	
2014	Call of Duty: Advanced Warfare	General McDonnell	
2017	Marvel vs. Capcom: Infinite	Mike Haggar	
2017	Call of Duty: WWII	Colonel Davis	
2019	Metro Exodus	Tokarev	
2022	Horizon Forbidden West	Stemmur	
