= Challen Cates =

American actress

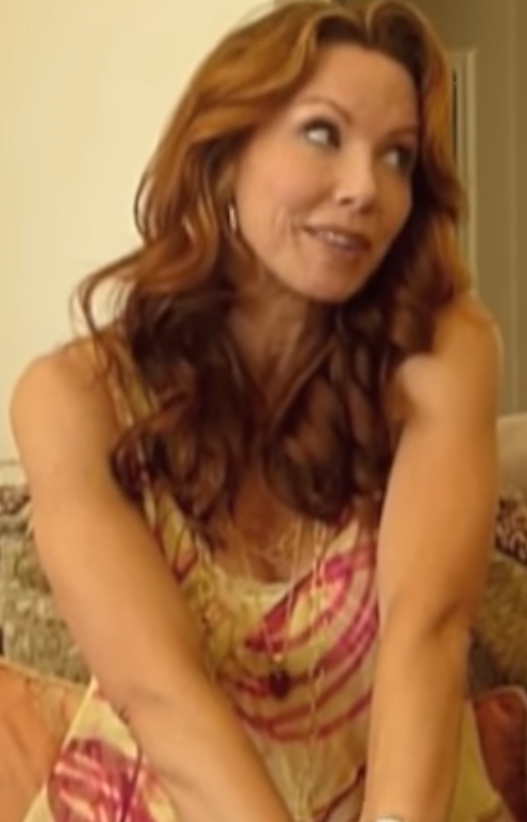
- Cates in 2012
- Born: Challen Michelle Cates; September 28, 1967 (age 58)
- Occupations: Actress; film producer; winemaker
- Years active: 1991–present
- Children: 2

Challen Michelle Cates (born September 28, 1967) is an American independent film producer and actress, best known for portraying the role as Jennifer Knight on the TV series, Big Time Rush. She has been the executive producer of two American independent films A Fare To Remember (1998) and The A-List (2001). In addition to producing, she has also played the main character in both movies. In 2004, she played the lead female role in the independent movie They Would Love You In France.

Since early 2000, Cates has also appeared in minor roles in several American television series, including Cybill, Roseanne, Diagnosis: Murder, 1-800-Missing, Monk, Criminal Minds, CSI: NY, Desperate Housewives and others. In 2007, she had a part in the TV movie The Dukes of Hazzard: The Beginning. She had a recurring role in the Nickelodeon original series Big Time Rush. Cates has also appeared in six Big Time Rush movies such as Big Time Audition, Big Time Concert, Big Time Christmas, Big Time Beach Party, Big Time Movie and Big Time Dreams.

== Personal life ==
Cates runs a wine company called Challen Winery, taking after her father. She has two children.
