= Denyse Tontz =

American actress, singer, and songwriter (born 1994)

- Born: September 17, 1994 (age 31)
- Occupations: Actress; singer; songwriter
- Years active: 2006–present
- Musical career
- Genres: Pop; acoustic
- Instruments: Vocals; piano; guitar
- Website: denysetontz.com

Denyse Tontz (born September 17, 1994) is an American actress, singer and songwriter. Tontz is known for her roles as Cortney Strathmore on Freeform's The Fosters, Miranda Montgomery on All My Children, Nikki Ortiz on Dog with a Blog, Elena on the 2017 Syfy series Incorporated, and heroine Alicia Mendoza in the 2019 ABC summer series Grand Hotel. She is known in the music world for her single, "United States of Anxiety", debuted in 2016 by People.com.

== Personal life ==
Tontz has a younger sister and a younger brother.

== Career ==
=== Acting ===
Before she began her acting career, Tontz was a child model and the face of Barbie couture in the UK. Tontz made her first appearance on television, appearing on the show E-Ring as Princess Gabrielle. In 2007, she portrayed Alice Keefe in the Nickelodeon movie The Last Day of Summer. In 2008, she was cast as Meagan Todd in the movie Dog Gone along with Luke Benward and French Stewart. Tontz began recurring on Big Time Rush in 2009 playing the role of Jennifer Woods. Tontz revealed on August 6, 2012, that Nickelodeon had renewed Big Time Rush for a 13-episode fourth season, a development that was later independently confirmed. However, Tontz herself didn't appear in the season and a cardboard standee of her character was used in place of her in the series finale.

In November 2012 Tontz appeared on the Disney Channel sitcom Dog with a Blog, playing Avery's Central American neighbor and Tyler's crush, Nikki. Nikki is sweet and talented but also initially quite naïve, and her pomeranian Evita becomes the object of Stan's affection. It was later announced that Tontz's character would begin to be recurring.

In early 2013 it was revealed that Tontz would be playing Miranda Montgomery in daytime drama All My Children. The first appearance of Tontz as Miranda Montgomery was on the April 29, 2013 premiere episode of All My Children. On November 11, 2013, it was announced that Prospect Park had closed production and canceled the series again.

In July 2015, Deadline Hollywood announced that Tontz was cast as a series regular in the USA pilot, Paradise Pictures, written and executive produced by Suits writer Rick Muirragui and executive produced by Suits creator/executive producer Aaron Korsh. The show was a period drama revolving around ambitious people striving to get to the top in 1940s Hollywood, and Tontz played a bright-eyed aspiring actress named Luciana from Marfa, Texas. The show did not go to series.

In 2016, it was announced that Tontz would join Matt Damon and Ben Affleck's Syfy thriller, Incorporated, as a series regular, alongside Sean Teale, Allison Miller, Dennis Haysbert and Julia Ormond. Tontz plays Elena, Larson's longtime love, who is forced to sell herself into servitude in order to pay off her family's debts. Created by David and Alex Pastor, the show is set in a distant future where corporations have unlimited power.

In 2019, Tontz starred as Alicia Mendoza on the ABC drama Grand Hotel, which ran for one season.

=== Music ===
In 2012, Tontz released the video for her first single, "Better Than Nothing" featuring Thomas Hrvatin, via YouTube. Shot on an iPhone 4S, the song features Tontz's quirky, playful style of writing. "Better Than Nothing" was also featured on the March 24, 2013 episode of The Mentalist.

In June 2014, represented by Danny Goldberg, Tontz won a Daytime Emmy Award for Outstanding Original Song for a Drama Series for "Parachute", an original song she wrote for All My Children.

She released her track "Why" on May 5, 2015, her song and video "Go", on July 4, 2015, and most recently "United States of Anxiety", on July 22, 2016.

== Filmography ==
Film and television roles
Year	Title	Role	Notes
2006	E-Ring	Princess Gabrielle	Episode: "The Two Princes"
2007	The Last Day of Summer	Alice Keefe	Film
2008	Dog Gone	Meagan Todd	Film
2009	The Perfect Sleep	Young Porphyria	Film
2009–2013	Big Time Rush	Jennifer 1	Recurring role, 21 episodes
2011	The Nine Lives of Chloe King	Vanessa	Episode: "Responsible"
2011	I Hate My Teenage Daughter	Snotty Girl	Episode: Pilot
2012	Shake It Up	Gloria	Episode: "Weird It Up"
2012–2013	Pair of Kings	Mary Ann/Tarantula Girl	Episodes: "The New King, Part 2: The Bro-fessor and Mary Ann", "Meet the Parent"
2012–2014	Dog with a Blog	Nikki Ortiz	Recurring role
2013	All My Children	Miranda Montgomery	Series regular
2014	Workaholics	Kim	Episode: "Beer Heist"
2014	Melissa & Joey	Layla	Episode: "Accidents Will Happen"
2014	Bones	Alice Kelly	Episode: "The Geek In The Guck"
2015	Earthfall	Rachel Lannon	Television movie
2015	Paradise Pictures	Luciana Delgado	Unsold television pilot
2016–2017	The Fosters	Cortney Strathmore	Recurring role, 21 episodes
2016–2017	Incorporated	Elena	Main role
2019	Grand Hotel	Alicia Mendoza	Main role

== Discography ==
- "Better Than Nothing" (feat. Thomas Hrvatin)
- "Use It"
- "Mr. Hipster"
- "Why" (track only)
- "Go"

=== Music videos ===
Year	Title	Director
2012	"Better Than Nothing"	N/A
