= Katelyn Tarver =

American actress and singer (born 1989)

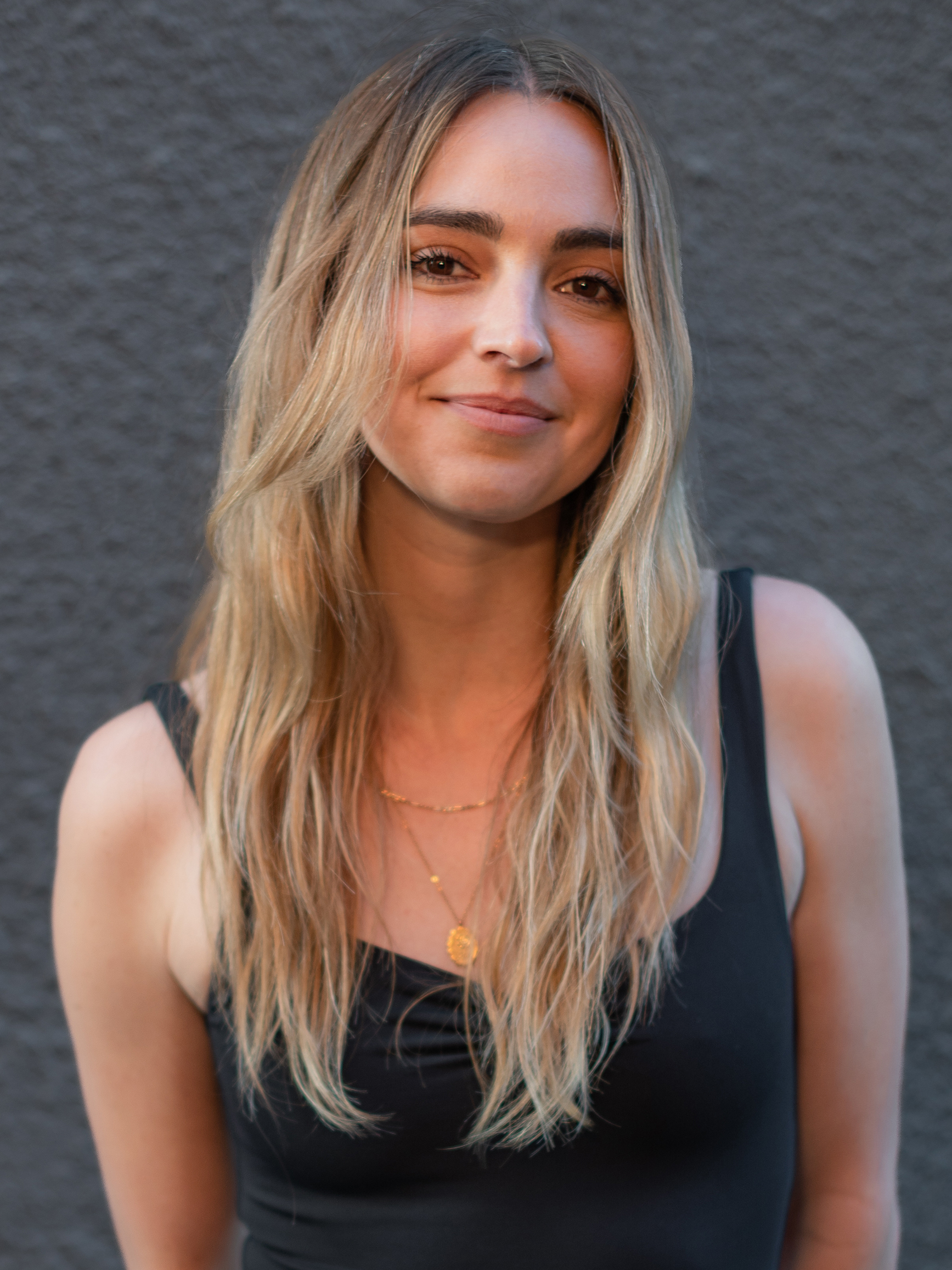
- Tarver in 2023
- Born: November 2, 1989 (age 37)
- Occupations: Actress; singer
- Years active: 2003–present
- Spouse: David Blaise (m. 2014; div. 2025)
- Relatives: Drew Tarver (brother)
- Musical career
- Genre: Pop
- Instrument: Vocals
- Label: Duly Noted
- Website: katelyntarver.com

Katelyn Tarver (born November 2, 1989) is an American actress and singer-songwriter. She has independently released four EPs since 2011, most notably Tired Eyes in 2017. She is also known for her recurring roles as Jo Taylor on the Nickelodeon series Big Time Rush, Natalie on the ABC series No Ordinary Family, Jesse in HBO series Ballers and Mercedes on ABC Family The Secret Life of the American Teenager. She co-wrote "Crazy Stupid Love" for the British singer Cheryl which peaked at #1 on UK Singles Chart in 2014.

== Career ==
=== Music ===
In 2003, Tarver took part in the reality television program American Juniors, where she was one of the Top 10 finalists, before being eliminated from the competition on August 12, 2003.

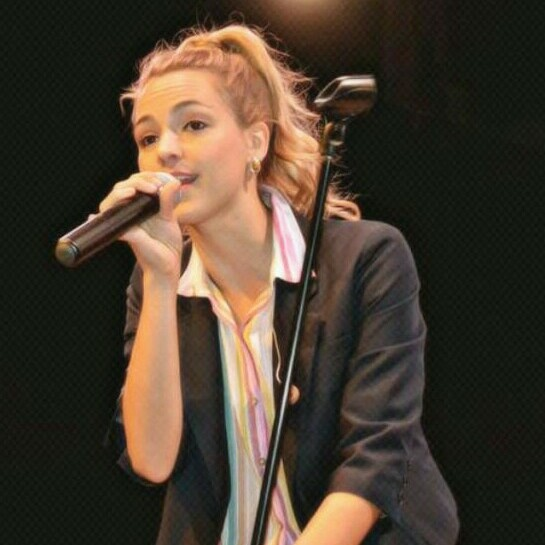
Tarver performing in 2011

On June 14, 2011, Tarver independently released her debut EP, A Little More Free, produced by Matt Grabe. She was Honor Society's opening act on their June–July 2011 "Wherever You Are" tour. Tarver also toured alongside the bands The Cab and Parachute during the summer of 2012.

In 2014, Tarver co-wrote Cheryl Cole's 2014 single "Crazy Stupid Love". Two more singles, "Weekend Millionaires" and "Nobody Like You" were released on the streaming platform SoundCloud in 2015. "Weekend Millionaires" was re-released on iTunes, Spotify, and other digital retailers on July 28, 2016. Another new track, "What Do We Know Now", was released in October, followed shortly by the BURNS-produced "Hate To Tell You" the following month.

In 2015, Tarver was featured on the Lost Kings track "You", which was released by Spinnin' Records as a single off their EP The Bad. In 2016, Tarver released a cover of Jeremih's song "Planez".

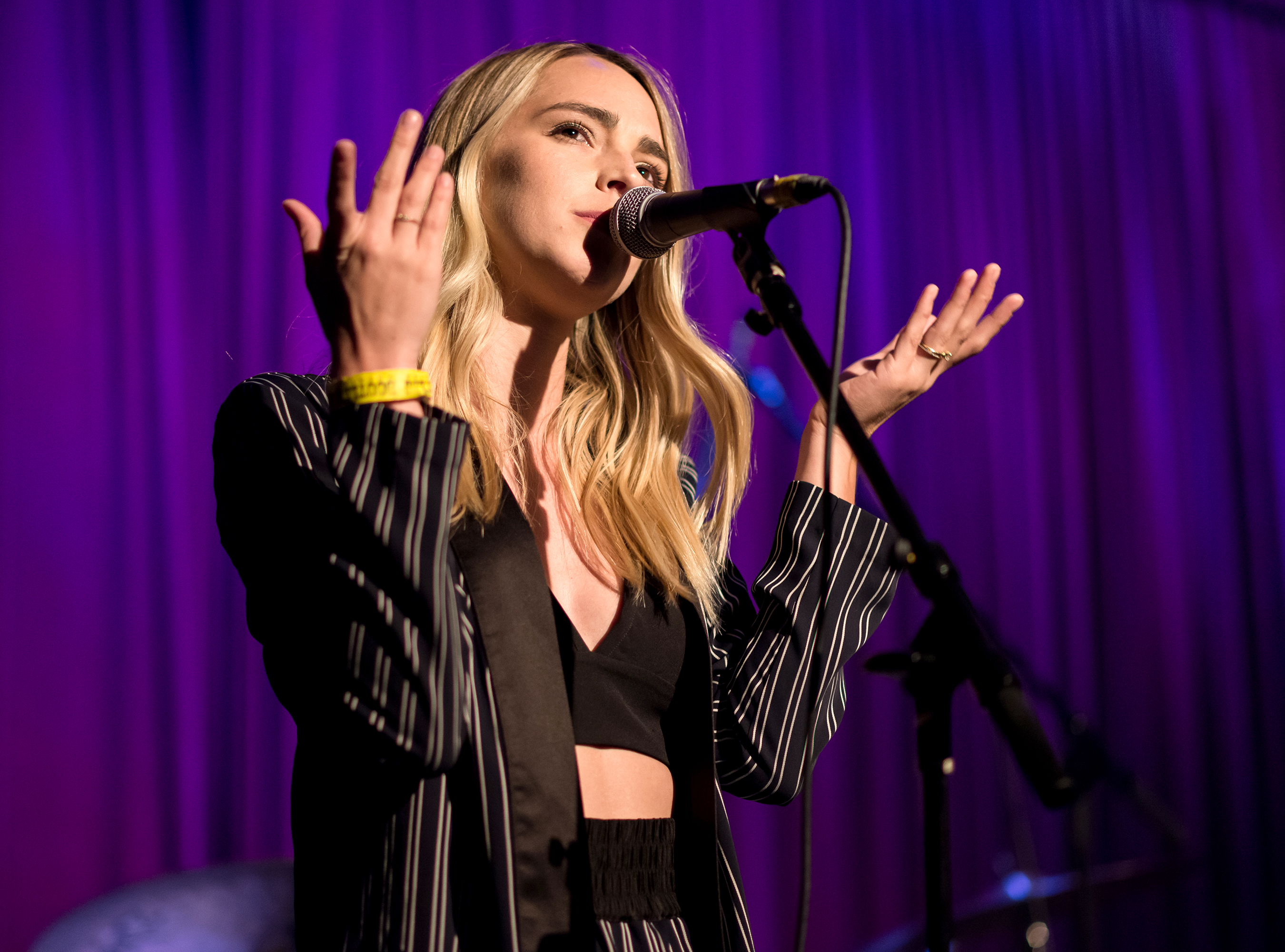
Tarver performing at the Bootleg Theater in Echo Park, Los Angeles in 2017

Tarver's second EP, Tired Eyes, was released on March 10, 2017. Her song "You Don't Know" went viral on YouTube and amassed over 50 million views by mid-2021. In 2018, Tarver released her third EP, Kool Aid. The EP received positive reviews from multiple music review websites including Clash.

In 2019, Tarver released five singles as well as her fourth EP, Kool Aid: Sugar Free (Acoustic). In 2020, she released nine singles including "Feel Bad". The music video of "Feel Bad" was directed by Se Oh and premiered on March 26, 2020, with Billboard. Later that year, Tarver co-wrote Jake Scott's song "Like No One Does". The single was released on April 7, 2020.

In 2021, Tarver collaborated with Will Anderson and launched a side-project called REAVES. Their debut EP, The First EP, was released on June 4, 2021.

Tarver was the winning songwriter on the Old Dominion episode of Songland, with her song "Young" being featured in a Jeep commercial in which Tarver also starred.

In 2025, it was announced that Tarver would reunite with her former Big Time Rush cast-members in a new concert tour titled the In Real Life Worldwide Tour as a supporting act.

=== Acting ===
On January 29, 2010, she made her acting debut on Big Time Rush as Jo Taylor, a girl the boys admire. Her debut episode was "Big Time Love Song" which aired on February 5, 2010. She developed feelings for Kendall Knight (Kendall Schmidt) and they started dating. But the world tour changed everything: Jo became a television star and Kendall became a pop star. On "Big Time Break-Up" which aired on June 25, 2011, she landed a role in a movie in New Zealand which would keep her and Kendall apart for three years. She returned in season 3's episode "Big Time Surprise", which aired on September 22, 2012.

From 2010 to 2011, Tarver appeared as Natalie Poston in 5 episodes of the ABC series No Ordinary Family. In 2012, she appeared as Mercedes in ABC Family's series The Secret Life of the American Teenager.

In 2018, Tarver appeared as Jesse in 8 episodes of the HBO series Ballers. She was cast as Cydney Walker in the ABC Signature television pilot, None of the Above, in 2021.

== Personal life ==
Tarver married musician David Blaise on July 19, 2014. In July 2025, Tarver announced in an Instagram post that she was divorced.

== Filmography ==
Television roles
Year	Title	Role	Notes
2003	American Juniors	Herself	Contestant (Top 10)
2010–2013	Big Time Rush	Jo Taylor	Recurring role, 34 episodes
2010–2011	No Ordinary Family	Natalie Poston	Recurring role, 5 episodes
2012	The Secret Life of the American Teenager	Mercedes	Recurring role, 8 episodes
2014	Dead on Campus	Natalie Kellison	Television film (Lifetime)
2017	Famous in Love	Rachael Davis	Recurring role (season 1), 5 episodes
2018	Babysitter's Nightmare	Claire Carven	Television film (Lifetime)
2018	Ballers	Jesse	Recurring role, 8 episodes
2019	Songland	Herself	Episode: "Old Dominion"
2020	Twentyfiveish	Rosie	Main role
2026	The Hawk	Natalie	Recurring role, 6 episodes

== Discography ==
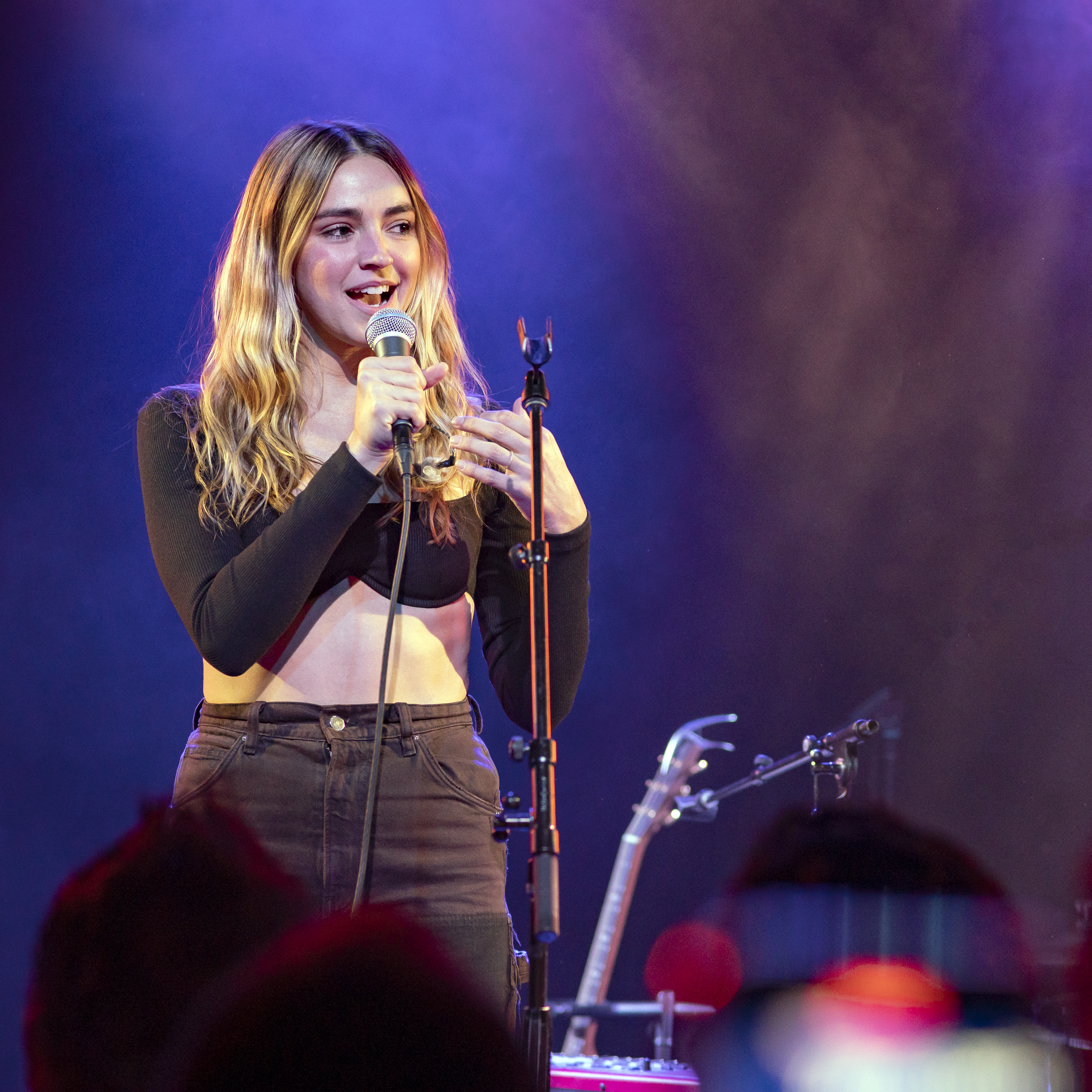
Tarver performing at the Troubadour in 2022

=== Studio albums ===
Title	Details
Wonderful Crazy	Released: November 8, 2005; Format: CD, Digital download, Streaming; Label: TC Music
Subject to Change	Released: November 12, 2021; Format: CD, LP, Digital download, streaming; Label: Independent
Quitter	Released: February 9, 2024; Format: CD, LP, Digital download, streaming; Label: Independent
Tell Me How You Really Feel	Released: March 6, 2026; Format: CD, LP, Digital download, streaming; Label: Independent

=== Reissues ===
Title	Details
Brand New Day	Released: September 27, 2006; Format: CD, Digital download, streaming; Label: Trident Style Inc

=== Extended plays ===
Title	Details
"I'll Make It Real/Lover Boy"	Released: December 15, 2005; Format: CD, Digital download; Label: TC Music, LLC
"Chasing Echoes"	Released: March 6, 2007; Format: Digital download, streaming; Label: TC Music, LLC
A Little More Free	Released: June 14, 2011; Format: CD, Digital download, streaming; Label: Independent
Tired Eyes	Released: March 10, 2017; Format: LP, Digital download, streaming; Label: Duly Noted Records
Kool Aid	Released: August 31, 2018; Format: Digital download, streaming; Label: Katelyn Tarver
Kool Aid: Sugar Free (Acoustic)	Released: March 8, 2019; Format: Digital download, streaming; Label: Katelyn Tarver

=== Singles ===
List of singles, with selected chart positions and certifications
Title	Year	Album
"Wonderful Crazy"	2005	Wonderful Crazy
"I'll Make It Real" (featuring Aaron Agassi)	2005	Wonderful Crazy
"Chasing Echoes"	2007	Wonderful Crazy
"Weekend Millionaires"	2016	Tired Eyes
"Planez"	2016	Non-album single
"What Do We Know Now"	2016	Tired Eyes
"Hate to Tell You"	2016	Tired Eyes
"Love Me Again"	2017	Tired Eyes
"You Don't Know"	2017	Tired Eyes
"Never Fade"	2018	Kool Aid
"LY4L"	2018	Kool Aid
"Labels"	2018	Kool Aid
"Kool Aid"	2018	Kool Aid
"Sinking In" (With Jake Scott)	2019	Non-album singles
"Cynical"	2019	Non-album singles
"Somebody Else"	2019	Non-album singles
"Heaven" (With SJ)	2020	Non-album singles
"Feel Bad"	2020	Non-album singles
"Made It This Far"	2020	Non-album singles
"So Would I"	2020	Non-album singles
"Young"	2020	Non-album singles
"Side of My Heart"	2020	Non-album singles
"Fall Apart Too"	2020	Non-album singles
"Hundred"	2020	Non-album singles
"Shit Happens"	2021	Subject to Change
"All Our Friends Are Splitting Up"	2021	Subject to Change
"Nicer"	2021	Subject to Change
"Hurt Like That"	2021	Subject to Change
"Year from Now"	2021	Subject to Change
"What Makes A Life Good?”	2023	Quitter
"Starting To Scare Me”	2023	Quitter
"Cinematic”	2023	Quitter
"Parallel Universe”	2023	Quitter
"Ignorance Is Bliss”	2023	Quitter
"Quitter”	2023	Quitter
"Friend Like You”	2023	Quitter
"Japanese Cafe”	2023	Quitter
"One Without The Other”	2024	Quitter
"Revisionist History”	2024	Quitter
"Just A Person”	2024	Quitter

=== As a featured artist ===
Title	Year	Album
"Broke" (Joe Budden featuring Katelyn Tarver)	2015	All Love Lost
"You" (Lost Kings featuring Katelyn Tarver)	2015	The Bad EP
"Another Universe" (BASTION featuring Katelyn Tarver)	2016	Crystal EP
"Illegal" (Fareoh featuring Katelyn Tarver)	2016	Non-album single
"I'm Here Now" (Tawny Newsome & Alex Kliner featuring Katelyn Tarver & Paul F. Tompkins)	2018	The Supergroup: Songs from Season 1
"Take Care" (Dillistone featuring Katelyn Tarver)	2019	Non-album singles
"Walking on the Moon" (Leucadia featuring Katelyn Tarver)	2019	Non-album singles

=== Promotional singles ===
Title	Year	Album
"Lover Boy"	2005	I'll Make It Real/Lover Boy
"Careless Whisper"	2007	Wonderful Crazy
"It's Good"	2011	A Little More Free
"Nobody Like You"	2015	Non-album promotional singles
"You Saxo Suelta" (with Esli Guzmán & Darek Sotelo)	2019	Non-album promotional singles
"Cool"	2019	Non-album promotional singles
"Dionne"	2020	Non-album promotional singles
"The Only Exception	2022	Non-album promotional singles

=== Other appearances ===
Title	Year	Other artist(s)	Album
"I'll Never Fall in Love"	2003	—N/a	American Juniors
"Us Against the World"	2009	Mitchel Musso	Mitchel Musso
"What We're Told	2016	Everett Champion	Aesthetic Sound
Life's a Cherry Pie	2020	Phil Danyew	The Planters

=== Music videos ===
As Lead artist
Title	Year	Director
"Wonderful Crazy"	2005	
"I'll Make It Real" (featuring Aaron Agassi)	2005	Treb Monteras II
"Weekend Millionaires"	2016	Chuck Willis
"Planez"	2016	Chuck Willis
"Hate to Tell You"	2017	Alejandro Reyes-Knight
"You Don't Know"	2017	Chuck Willis
"Never Fade"	2018	Luca Venter
"Labels"	2018	Nathan Presley
"Kool Aid"	2018	Luca Venter
"Sinking In" (with Jake Scott)	2019	Nathan Presley
"Cynical"	2019	Se Oh
"Somebody Else"	2019	Se Oh
"Heaven" (with SJ)	2020	Spencer Sutherland
"Feel Bad"	2020	Se Oh
"So Would I"	2020	Nathan Presley
"Shit Happens"	2021	Katelyn Tarver & Patrick Jones
"Nicer"	2021	Fiori
"Year from Now"	2021	Nathan Presley
"What Makes A Life Good?”	2023	
"Starting To Scare Me”	2023	Skyler Brown
"Cinematic”	2023	
"Parallel Universe”	2023	
"Quitter”	2023	
"Japanese Cafe”	2023	
"One Without The Other”	2024	
"Revisionist History”	2024	
"Just A Person”	2024	

As featured artist
Title	Year	Main artist	Director
"You"	2016	Lost Kings	

=== Songwriting credits ===
Year	Song	Artist(s)	Album
2014	"Crazy Stupid Love"	Cheryl	Only Human
2018	"Young"	Old Dominion	Non-album single
2020	"Like No One Does"	Jake Scott	TWENTYTWENTY
2021	"Secret"	Joshua Bassett	Crisis / Secret / Set Me Free
2021	"Set Me Free"	Joshua Bassett	Crisis / Secret / Set Me Free
2022	"All in Due Time"	Joshua Bassett	Sad Songs in a Hotel Room

- Source: - Discography at Spotify
- Source: - Discography at AllMusic
