= Another Life (Big Time Rush album) =

- Standard edition cover

Studio album by Big Time Rush
- Released: June 2, 2023
- Recorded: 2021–2023
- Genre: Pop
- Length: 30:50; 45:12 (Deluxe Edition)
- Label: Bought the Rights; BMG
- Producer: Adam Korbesmeyer; Will Ventres; Nicholas Furlong; Bryan Todd; Maffio

Big Time Rush chronology
The Greatest Hits (2016)	Another Life (2023)

Singles from Another Life
- 1. "Can't Get Enough" Released: February 6, 2023; 2. "Waves" Released: May 3, 2023; 3. "Weekends" Released: October 24, 2023

Another Life is the fourth studio album by American boy band Big Time Rush. It was released on June 2, 2023, and is their first studio album released under their own independent label, Bought the Rights, and BMG. It marks their first studio album in just under a decade since 24/Seven (2013).

== Background ==
After a seven-year hiatus, Big Time Rush announced they would be reuniting for two performances in New York and Chicago in December 2021. Shortly before these performances, the band released their first single in over eight years, "Call It Like I See It". This release was succeeded by multiple standalone singles in 2022, including "Not Giving You Up", "Fall", "Honey", "Dale Pa' Ya" with Dominican artist Maffio, and a re-recording of "Paralyzed". These singles were promoted by the band's first tour in eight years, the Forever Tour.

== Release and promotion ==
On April 4, 2023, the band announced the release date of a new single on May 3, 2023, followed by the release of their fourth studio album on June 9, 2023. The full track list was revealed on April 30, 2023, confirming that the album would be titled Another Life. Pre-orders of the album became available on May 3, 2023, alongside the release of another new single and the reveal of the official album artwork.

On May 5, 2023, the band announced Another Life would be released a week earlier on June 2, 2023, coinciding with their performance on Today as part of the 2023 Citi Summer Concert Series. Subsequently, the album was released on CD and LP on August 18, 2023, and September 22, 2023, respectively worldwide.

The band later announced that a deluxe edition of the album would be released on November 10, 2023. This version of the album includes three new songs, an acoustic version of "Weekends", and a re-recording of an unreleased song "Shot in the Dark", which was previously featured on the band's television show.

=== Singles ===
"Can't Get Enough" was released on February 6, 2023, as the album's lead single alongside a performance of the song on the Today Show and announcement of the Can't Get Enough Tour.

The second single, "Waves", was released on May 3, 2023, alongside the pre-orders of the album. A music video was released on the same day.

The third single, "Weekends", was released on October 24, 2023, alongside the announcement of the album's deluxe edition. The release was accompanied by a music video. An acoustic version of the song is included on the deluxe edition of the album.

== Critical reception ==
Professional ratings
Review scores
Source	Rating
Riff Magazine	5/10 stars

Vera Maksymiuk of Riff Magazine gave a review for the album. She called the record, "a fun, breezy and pleasant summer album." She described the first track, "Can't Get Enough" as a song that "sounds like a cross between more recent Jonas Brothers material and One Direction." Tracks such as "I Just Want To (Party All the Time)", were described as "traditional pop songs about love, longing and partying." She also called the final track "Another Life", "arguably the deepest of the entire record." She ended off stating, "Though Big Time Rush puts most of the bubblegum pop sound of earlier years behind them on Another Life, this album isn't a philosophical deep-dive into the intricacies of the human psyche."

== Track listing ==
Standard edition
No.	Title	Writer(s)	Producer(s)	Length
1.	"Can't Get Enough"	Adam Korbesmeyer; Candace Sosa; Carlos PenaVega; James Maslow; Kendall Schmidt; Logan Henderson	Korbesmeyer^{[p]}; Schmidt^{[v]}	3:26
2.	"Waves"	PenaVega; Maslow; Schmidt; Henderson; Tyler Shamy; Will Ventres	Will Ventres	3:15
3.	"I Just Want To (Party All the Time)"	PenaVega; James Johnson; Maslow; Schmidt; Henderson; Nicholas Furlong; Spencer Nezey; Ventres	Nicholas Furlong; Ventres	2:51
4.	"Weekends"	Bryan Todd; PenaVega; Maslow; Josh Gabbard; Schmidt; Henderson; Ventres	Bryan Todd; Ventres; Max Borghetti	3:05
5.	"Work for It"	Korbesmeyer; Sosa; PenaVega; Maslow; Schmidt; Henderson	Korbesmeyer^{[p]}; Schmidt^{[v]}	2:34
6.	"Forget You Now"	Carlos Ariel Peralta; PenaVega; Maslow; Schmidt; Henderson; Furlong; Ventres	Maffio; Ventres	3:16
7.	"Brand New"	Korbesmeyer; Sosa; PenaVega; Maslow; Schmidt; Henderson; Sophie Rose	Korbesmeyer^{[p]}; Schmidt^{[v]}	3:37
8.	"Ask You Tonight"	Korbesmeyer; Todd; PenaVega; Maslow; Gabbard; Schmidt; Henderson; Furlong	Korbesmeyer; Bryan Todd^{[p]}	3:00
9.	"Superstitious"	PenaVega; Maslow; Schmidt; Henderson; Ventres	Ventres; Max Borghetti	3:14
10.	"Another Life"	Adam Amezaga; Korbesmeyer; PenaVega; Maslow; Schmidt; Henderson; Furlong	Korbesmeyer^{[p]}; Furlong^{[p]}; Schmidt^{[v]}	2:32
Total length:				30:50

Deluxe edition
No.	Title	Writer(s)	Producer(s)	Length
11.	"Shot in the Dark"	Brandon Michael Green; Justin Scott Franks; Todd Ballard	Ventres	3:10
12.	"Learn to Love"	Korbesmeyer; Catherine Allison Ward; David Ryan Harris; Jerry Lang II; Schmidt; Henderson; Furlong	Cut&Dry; Furlong	2:34
13.	"Dreamworld"	Bryan Todd; PenaVega; Maslow; Gabbard; Schmidt; Henderson	Bryan Todd	2:47
14.	"Your Way"	Korbesmeyer; Sosa; Schmidt; Henderson	Korbesmeyer	2:41
15.	"Weekends" (acoustic)	Bryan Todd; PenaVega; Maslow; Josh Gabbard; Schmidt; Henderson; Ventres	Bryan Todd; Ventres; Max Borghetti	3:10
Total length:				45:12

== Personnel ==
Big Time Rush

- Kendall Schmidt – vocals (all tracks), keyboards (track 7)
- James Maslow – vocals
- Carlos PenaVega – vocals
- Logan Henderson – vocals

Additional musicians

- Adam Korbesmeyer – drum programming (1, 5, 7, 8, 10), keyboards (1, 5, 8, 10), guitar (1, 7), bass guitar (1), programming (8)
- Nick Furlong – programming (3, 10); backing vocals, keyboards (10)
- Will Ventres – programming (3, 4, 6, 9)
- Spencer Nezey – saxophone (3)
- Rick James – vocals (3)
- Jonathan Martin Berry – guitar (4, 8)
- Bryan Todd – programming (4, 8)
- Homero Gallardo – guitar (6, 9)
- Max Borghetti – programming (4, 9, 10, 15)
- Candace Sosa – backing vocals (7)
- Sophie Rose Abrams – backing vocals (7)
- Tim Snider – strings (7, 8)
- Adam Amezaga – guitar (10)

Technical

- Randy Merrill – mastering
- Nathan Phillips – mixing, engineering

== Charts ==
Chart performance for Another Life
Chart (2023)	Peak position
US Top Album Sales (Billboard)	17

== Release history ==
Release dates and formats for Another Life
Region	Date	Format(s)	Version	Ref.
Various	June 2, 2023	Digital download; streaming	Standard	
Germany	August 17, 2023	CD	Standard	
Various	August 18, 2023	CD	Standard	
Germany	September 21, 2023	LP	Standard	
Various	September 22, 2023	LP	Standard	
Various	November 10, 2023	Digital download; streaming	Deluxe	
