= Big Time Summer Tour =

2012 concert tour by Big Time Rush

- Tour by Big Time Rush
- Associated album: Elevate; Big Time Movie
- Start date: July 5, 2012
- End date: October 11, 2012
- Legs: 2
- No. of shows: 61 in North America; 5 in South America; 66 in total

Big Time Rush concert chronology
- Better with U Tour (2012); Big Time Summer Tour (2012); Summer Break Tour (2013)

The Big Time Summer Tour was the third concert tour and the first official world tour by boy band Big Time Rush. Visiting the Americas, the tour supported the band's second studio album, Elevate and their second official soundtrack, Big Time Movie Soundtrack. The tour began in July 2012 and ended in the following October. It became the second best selling tour according to ticketmaster.com in the summer of 2012 as well.

== Background ==
The tour was announced in February 2012, days before the band commenced their second tour. This tour saw the band performing in amphitheatres during the summer season. Band member Carlos Peña said the tour was "going to be crazy", allowing the band to do a more expansive show with a bigger set. This also marks the band's first performance in South America, headlining the Z Festival and Teens Live Festival. Commenting on the tour, the band stated: "We can't wait to hit the road again. The Better with U Tour has been amazing and we're incredibly grateful to our fans who have supported us and made our first [tour] a success".

== Critical reception ==
The tour received mixed reviews from music critics. The concert at the Mandalay Bay Events Center was enjoyed by everyone in the audience, writes Ron Sylvester (Las Vegas Sun). He continues, "Because the true measure of Big Time Rush won't be about a show on one Saturday night at Mandalay Bay. It will be written in the memories of the screaming girls if they continue to warmly recall those songs as they grow up. And whether they're willing to buy tickets to hear that music again in Las Vegas showrooms 40 years from now".

Jim Abbott (Orlando Sentinel) called the show at the Amway Center unnatural and formulaic. He explains, "Compared with that free-spirited British group, BTR's stage presence was more contrived, more tightly choreographed even in the moments that were supposed to be spontaneous".

== Opening acts ==
- Cody Simpson (North America)
- Rachel Crow (North America, select dates)
- Leon Thomas III (North America, select dates)
- Tyler Medeiros (Canada)
- Victoria Duffield (Canada)
- New Hollow (Las Vegas)
- La Pepa (San Juan)

== Setlist ==
1. "Elevate"
2. "Time of Our Life"
3. "City Is Ours"
4. "No Idea"
5. "Love Me Love Me"
6. "If I Ruled the World"
7. "Halfway There"
8. "Invisible"
9. "Boyfriend"
10. "Cover Girl"
11. "Worldwide"
12. "I Want to Hold Your Hand"
13. "Help!"
14. "Show Me"
15. "Music Sounds Better with U"
16. "Windows Down"
17. "Til I Forget About You"
18. "Big Time Rush"

== Shows ==
Date (2012)	City	Country	Venue	Attendance	Revenue
North America
July 5	Columbus	United States	Nationwide Arena	—N/a	
July 6 (Note: This concert was a part of "Summerfest")	Milwaukee	United States	Marcus Amphitheater	—N/a	
July 7	Maryland Heights	United States	Verizon Wireless Amphitheater	—N/a	
July 8	Cincinnati	United States	Riverbend Music Center	—N/a	
July 10	Atlanta	United States	Aaron's Amphitheatre at Lakewood	—N/a	
July 11	Pelham	United States	Verizon Wireless Music Center	—N/a	
July 13	The Woodlands	United States	Cynthia Woods Mitchell Pavilion	—N/a	
July 14	Dallas	United States	Gexa Energy Pavilion	—N/a	
July 15	Tulsa	United States	BOK Center	7,485 / 7,485 (100%)	$270,015
July 17	Phoenix	United States	Ashley Furniture HomeStore Pavilion	—N/a	
July 19	Irvine	United States	Verizon Wireless Amphitheatre	—N/a	
July 20	Chula Vista	United States	Cricket Wireless Amphitheatre	—N/a	
July 21	Las Vegas	United States	Mandalay Bay Events Center	—N/a	
July 22	Mountain View	United States	Shoreline Amphitheatre	—N/a	
July 23 (Note: This concert was a part of the "California Mid-State Fair")	Paso Robles	United States	Chumash Grandstand Arena	—N/a	
July 25	West Valley City	United States	USANA Amphitheatre	—N/a	
July 27	Kansas City	United States	Sprint Center	—N/a	
July 28	Minneapolis	United States	Target Center	—N/a	
July 29	Noblesville	United States	Klipsch Music Center	—N/a	
July 31	Clarkston	United States	DTE Energy Music Theatre	—N/a	
August 1	Cuyahoga Falls	United States	Blossom Music Center	—N/a	
August 3	Louisville	United States	KFC Yum! Center	5,917 / 8,340 (71%)	$321,445
August 4	Tinley Park	United States	First Midwest Bank Amphitheatre	—N/a	
August 5	Burgettstown	United States	First Niagara Pavilion	—N/a	
August 7	Bethel	United States	Bethel Woods Center for the Arts	—N/a	
August 8	Wantagh	United States	Nikon at Jones Beach Theater	—N/a	
August 9	Darien	United States	Darien Lake Performing Arts Center	—N/a	
August 10	Camden	United States	Susquehanna Bank Center	—N/a	
August 11	Hershey	United States	Star Pavilion	—N/a	
August 12	Mansfield	United States	Comcast Center	—N/a	
August 14	Saratoga	United States	Saratoga Performing Arts Center	—N/a	
August 16 (Note: This concert was a part of the "Iowa State Fair")	Des Moines	United States	Iowa State Fairgrounds Grandstand	—N/a	
August 17	Wantagh	United States	Nikon at Jones Beach Theater	—N/a	
August 18	Holmdel Township	United States	PNC Bank Arts Center	—N/a	
August 19	Bristow	United States	Jiffy Lube Live	—N/a	
August 21	Virginia Beach	United States	Farm Bureau Live	—N/a	
August 22	Raleigh	United States	Time Warner Cable Music Pavilion	—N/a	
August 24	West Palm Beach	United States	Cruzan Amphitheatre	—N/a	
August 25	Tampa	United States	1-800-ASK-GARY Amphitheatre	—N/a	
August 26	San Juan	Puerto Rico	José Miguel Agrelot Coliseum	3,827 / 5,529 (69%)	$263,537
August 28	Orlando	United States	Amway Center	4,948 / 8,073 (61%)	$212,115
August 29	Charlotte	United States	Verizon Wireless Amphitheatre	—N/a	
August 31	Bangor	United States	Bangor Waterfront Pavilion	—N/a	
September 1	Manchester	United States	Verizon Wireless Arena	—N/a	
September 2	Hartford	United States	Comcast Theatre	—N/a	
September 4	Montreal	Canada	Bell Centre	2,461 / 3,075 (79%)	$145,387
September 5	London	Canada	Budweiser Gardens	2,441 / 6,850 (35%)	$110,145
September 7	Ottawa	Canada	Scotiabank Place	—N/a	
September 8	Toronto	Canada	Molson Canadian Amphitheatre	6,012 / 16,158 (37%)	$305,912
September 9	Grand Rapids	United States	Van Andel Arena	4,546 / 4,952 (92%)	$180,040
September 11	Moline	United States	iWireless Center	3,246 / 4,500 (72%)	$125,916
September 13	Edmonton	Canada	Rexall Place	—N/a	
September 14	Calgary	Canada	Scotiabank Saddledome	—N/a	
September 16	Vancouver	Canada	Rogers Arena	—N/a	
September 17 (Note: This concert was a part of the "Puyallup Fair")	Puyallup	United States	Northwest Concert Center	—N/a	
September 18	Portland	United States	Rose Garden	—N/a	
September 25	Mexico City	Mexico	Palacio de los Deportes	16,736 / 17,014 (98%)	$720,230
September 26	Monterrey	Mexico	Auditorio Banamex	6,799 / 6,968 (97%)	$462,933
South America
September 29 (Note: These concerts were a part of the "Z Festival")	São Paulo	Brazil	Arena Anhembi	12,193 / 16,500 (73%)	$1,144,620
September 30	Rio de Janeiro	Brazil	HSBC Arena	6,846 / 7,500 (91%)	$625,108
October 3 (Note: These concerts were a part of the "Teens Live Festival")	Lima	Peru	Jockey Club del Perú	—N/a	
October 6	Buenos Aires	Argentina	Estadio G.E.B.A.	—N/a	
October 7	Santiago	Chile	Arena Movistar	—N/a	
Central America
October 11	Panama City	Panama	Figali Convention Center	—N/a	
Total				83,457 / 112,944 (73%)	$4,887,403

=== Cancelled ===
Date (2012)	City	Country	Venue	Ref.
September 20	Reno	United States	Reno Events Center	
September 21	Wheatland	United States	Sleep Train Amphitheatre	
September 22	Ontario	United States	Citizens Business Bank Arena	
October 9	San José	Costa Rica	Estadio Ricardo Saprissa Aymá	
