= Big Time Movie Soundtrack =

EP by Big Time Rush
- Released: March 6, 2012
- Genre: Pop
- Length: 14:37
- Label: Nickelodeon; Columbia
- Producer: Greg Wells; Damon Sharpe; Hipjoint Productions; Chris Anderson; Soulshock; Rob Wells

Big Time Rush chronology
Elevate (2011)	Big Time Movie Soundtrack (2012)	24/Seven (2013)

Big Time Movie Soundtrack is the second EP by pop group Big Time Rush. The EP is the soundtrack of the television film Big Time Movie, which is based on the Nickelodeon series Big Time Rush. Released on March 6, 2012, it consists of six cover songs of the Beatles. The EP peaked at number 44 on the Billboard 200 and number two on the US Kid Albums chart.

== Background and release ==
In November 2011, Big Time Rush began the filming for their movie, Big Time Movie in Vancouver. It was also revealed that they would be recording a soundtrack, comprising four cover songs of the Beatles, "A Hard Day's Night", "Revolution", "Help!" and "We Can Work It Out". Upon this announcement, Logan Henderson stated, "We are excited to help introduce the Beatles music to a younger generation. They were such amazing artists we feel so honored to have this opportunity." Creator Scott Fellows also added that they "wanted to make sure we were respectful to the music."

The soundtrack was announced on February 14, 2012, and two more cover songs of the Beatles were revealed, "Can't Buy Me Love" and "I Wanna Hold Your Hand". The EP was streamed exclusively via Billboard on February 29, before it was released on March 6.

== Critical reception ==
Matt Collar of AllMusic wrote, "These are contemporary pop and dance-oriented cover versions that still retain the melodic Beatles magic." David Hiltbrand of The Philadelphia Inquirer described the EP as "thin, but jaunty."

== Commercial performance ==
The Big Time Movie Soundtrack debuted at number 44 on the Billboard 200, number two on the US Kid Albums chart and number four on the US Soundtrack Albums chart. On the Billboard 200, it only lasted a week on chart.

== Track listing ==
All songs were written by John Lennon and Paul McCartney, as part of their Lennon–McCartney partnership. All songs were originally recorded by The Beatles spanning over their 8-year recording career as a group.

No.	Title	Length
1.	"A Hard Day's Night"	2:27
2.	"Revolution"	3:09
3.	"Help!"	2:13
4.	"Can't Buy Me Love"	2:08
5.	"We Can Work It Out"	2:16
6.	"I Wanna Hold Your Hand"	2:24
Total length:		14:37

== Personnel ==
Credits adapted from album's liner notes.

- Big Time Rush – performer
- John Crown – drums (1–3, 5, 6), guitar (1–3, 5, 6), bass (1–3, 5, 6)
- Christopher Rojas – engineer (1–3, 5)
- Julian Coryell – guitar (4)
- Steve O'Connor – keyboard (1–3, 5)
- Stephen Marcussen – mastering engineer (1–3, 5, 6)
- Greg Wells – producer (1–3, 5, 6)
- Damon Sharpe – producer (3, 4)
- Hipjoint Productions – producer (5)
- Chris Anderson – producer (1–3, 5, 6), programming (1–3, 5)
- Soulshock – producer (4), mixing engineer (4)
- Rob Wells – producer (1–3, 5), programming (1–3, 5)
- Mike James – additional vocals (1–3)
- Troy Samson – additional vocals (1–3)

== Charts ==
Chart performance for Big Time Movie Soundtrack
Chart (2012)	Peak position
US Billboard 200	44
US Kid Albums (Billboard)	2
US Soundtrack Albums (Billboard)	4
