= Elevate (Big Time Rush song) =

Promotional single by Big Time Rush

from the album Elevate
- Released: June 1, 2012
- Recorded: July 2011
- Genre: Dance pop; synth pop
- Length: 3:06
- Label: Nickelodeon; Columbia
- Songwriters: James Maslow; Damon Sharpe; Johnny Powers Severin; Eric Sanicola
- Producers: Sharpe; Johnny Powers Severin; Sanicola

Music video
- "Elevate" on YouTube

"Elevate" is a song by American pop group, Big Time Rush. It was released on June 1, 2012, as the second promotional single from their second studio album of the same name.

== Background and release ==
The song was released for digital download on June 1, 2012, via iTunes, containing "Blow Your Speakers" as the B-side. It was released as a single in the United Kingdom on June 3. The song was featured on their Nickelodeon television film, Big Time Movie.

== Composition ==
"Elevate" was written by James Maslow, Damon Sharpe, Johnny Powers Severin and Eric Sanicola, while production was handled by Sharpe, Severin and Sanicola. The song is an uptempo track and is described as dance and synth-pop. According to Maslow, he was in a room with Sharpe and Sanicola, and they decided to create "a party song," as the album had a lot mid-tempo and slow tracks. It was the last track written for the album and Maslow stated that the song "represents just having a good time." The song was recorded in July 2011.

== Critical reception ==
Jessica Sager of PopCrush praised the upbeat track, remarking, "Hand claps, dance beats and super fun synths combine to 'Elevate' Big Time Rush's devoted Rushers." Jessica Dawson of Common Sense Media described the track as "an obvious stand out" from the album.

== Music video ==
The music video for "Elevate" premiered on April 21, 2012, via VEVO and was directed by Shawn Corrigan. The video was shot during their Better With U Tour and combines footage of the group performing live, as well as fan footage. Logan Henderson told Entertainment Weekly that the video was "a collaboration between our fans and us," while Kendall Schmidt stated, "There's nothing more exciting to me then seeing all of our fans in this video... I'm glad we can share a little piece with anyone who hasn't seen BTR live yet!."

== Track listing ==
Digital download
No.	Title	Length
1.	"Elevate"	3:06
2.	"Blow Your Speakers"	3:12

== Personnel ==
Credits for "Elevate" adapted from album's liner notes.

- Damon Sharpe – producer, engineering
- Eric Sanicola – producer, engineering
- Johnny Powers Severin – producer
- Trevor Muzzy – mixing

== Charts ==
Chart performance for "Elevate"
Chart (2012)	Peak position
US Kid Digital Songs (Billboard)	3

== Release history ==
Release dates and formats for "Elevate"
Region	Date	Format	Label	Ref.
Various	June 1, 2012	Digital download	Nickelodeon; Columbia	
United Kingdom	June 3, 2012	Digital download	Nickelodeon; Columbia	
