= Windows Down =

Single by Big Time Rush

from the album Elevate
- Released: June 25, 2012
- Recorded: 2012
- Genre: Electropop; post-dubstep
- Length: 3:11
- Label: Nickelodeon; Columbia
- Songwriters: Alexander James; Bei Maejor; Damon Albarn; Dave Rowntree; Graham Coxon; Matt Squire; Matthew Musto; Mike Posner
- Producers: Kesha; Bei Maejor; Matt Squire

Big Time Rush singles chronology
"Music Sounds Better with U" (2012)	"Windows Down" (2012)	"Call It Like I See It" (2021)

Music video
- "Windows Down" on YouTube

"Windows Down" is a song by American boy band Big Time Rush from the re-release of their second studio album Elevate. The song was released on June 25, 2012, and was released to US radio on July 24, 2012. The song's hook is sampled from "Song 2" by English rock band Blur.

== Background and release ==
"Windows Down" was made available for streaming exclusively via Cambio.com on June 11, 2012. The group revealed the album artwork on June 13. The song was officially released as a single on June 25, via iTunes. Kendall Schmidt believed that the track would "appeal to people of all ages," while Carlos PenaVega hoped it "bring in some of the older demo."

== Composition ==
The song was written by Blackbear, Mike Posner, Alexander James, Damon Albarn, Dave Rowntree, Graham Coxon, Bei Maejor, and Matt Squire, with production handled by the latter two while additional by CJ Baran. It features samples from "Song 2" by Blur, but is up-tuned to the key of B minor. American singer/songwriter Kesha originally created an early demo of the track, expected to appear on her second studio album Warrior with the title "Woo Hoo", still using the Blur sample, but later sold the instrumental to Big Time Rush, and the song was re-written to create "Windows Down".

== Critical reception ==
Nick Bassett from UK site The Re-View called "Windows Down" a "surefire summer pop hit", complimenting the use of the "Song 2" sample and wrapping up his article saying that it should "mark Big Time Rush as some hot, home-grown competition for our Transatlantic invading boybands".

== Chart performance ==
"Windows Down" peaked at number 97 on Billboard Hot 100 and lasted one week on chart. The song also peaked at number 35 on the Billboard Mainstream Top 40 and stayed on chart for three weeks.

== Music video ==
The music video was filmed in Maui, Hawaii and was released on Vevo on June 22, three days before the single's iTunes release. It was directed by Marc Klasfeld and was recorded over the course of five days. The video features the band doing various activities in Hawaii like surfing, paddle boarding, swimming in the ocean, and standing on top of Jeep Wranglers. Logan Henderson described the song as one that "embodies fun" and wanted to create a video to capture that.

== Track listing ==
- Digital download
1. "Windows Down" – 3:12
- EU CD single
1. "Windows Down" – 3:13
2. "Windows Down" (Instrumental) – 2:59

== Charts ==
=== Weekly charts ===
Weekly chart performance for "Windows Down"
Chart (2012)	Peak position
Belgium (Ultratip Bubbling Under Flanders)	49
Belgium (Ultratip Bubbling Under Wallonia)	26
US Billboard Hot 100	97
US Kid Digital Song Sales (Billboard)	1
US Pop Airplay (Billboard)	35
US Pop Digital Song Sales (Billboard)	24

=== Year-end charts ===
Yearly chart performance for "Windows Down"
Chart (2012)	Position
Ukraine Airplay (TopHit)	195
US Kid Digital Song Sales (Billboard)	2

== Certifications ==
Certifications for "Windows Down"
Region	Certification	Certified units/sales
United States (RIAA)	Gold	500,000^{‡}
^{‡} Sales+streaming figures based on certification alone.

== Release history ==
Release dates and formats for "Windows Down"
Region	Date	Format	Label	Ref.
Various	June 25, 2012	Digital download	Columbia	
United States	July 24, 2012	Contemporary hit radio	Columbia	
Europe	July 27, 2012	CD	Columbia	
