= PenaVega =

PenaVega is a surname. Notable people with the surname include:

- Alexa PenaVega (née Alexa Eliesse Vega; born 1988), American actress and singer
- Carlos PenaVega (né Carlos Roberto Pena Jr.; born 1989), American film and TV actor and singer
