= Like Nobody's Around =

Promotional single by Big Time Rush

from the album 24/Seven
- Released: March 23, 2013
- Recorded: November 2012
- Studio: The Lair & SOMD Studios (Los Angeles, CA)
- Length: 2:56
- Label: Nickelodeon; Columbia
- Songwriters: Jason Evigan; Mitch Allan; Emily Wright; Claude Kelly; Austin Bis
- Producers: Matt Squire; The Suspex; Bis

Music video
- "Like Nobody's Around" on YouTube

"Like Nobody's Around" is a song by American pop group, Big Time Rush. It was released on March 23, 2013, as the first and only promotional single from their third studio album, 24/Seven.

== Background ==
"Like Nobody's Around" was released on March 23, 2013, along with the pre-order of their album, 24/Seven. Kendall Schmidt spoke about the song in an interview with PopCrush. He noted how the song has a positive message and is about being yourself and not to judge people.

"I think a lot of music today is just about drinking and having a good time, which is great, it's fine! But, kids need to have positive messages. It's supposed to send the message that you can have fun being you and being creative."

== Composition ==
"Like Nobody's Around" was written by Jason Evigan, Mitch Allan, Emily Wright, Claude Kelly and Austin Bis, while production was handled by Matt Squire, The Suspex and Bis. It was recorded at The Lair and SOMD Studios in Los Angeles, in November 2012. The song is described as "a midtempo pop track."

== Critical reception ==
Jessica Sager of PopCrush stated, "'Like Nobody's Around' isn't just a fun song for Rushers to sing along to, but it also has a great message for the young fan base."

== Music video ==
The music video for "Like Nobody's Around" premiered on March 23, 2013, at the 2013 Kids' Choice Awards. The video was uploaded on VEVO on March 27, and was directed by Savage Steve Holland. The video references other successful boy bands in past decades as The Ink Spots (1940s/1950s), The Temptations (1960s), The Jackson 5 (1970s), New Kids on the Block (1980s), Backstreet Boys (1990s) and *NSYNC (2000s). Within the first four months, the song garnered 4.7 million views on YouTube.

== Personnel ==
Credits adapted from album's liner notes.

- Matt Squire – producer
- The Suspex – producer
- Austin Bisnow – additional producer
- Miles Walker – mixing
- Tim Frisen – assistant mixing
- Larry Goetz – additional engineering
- Steve Tippeconnic – additional engineering

== Charts ==
Chart performance for "Like Nobody's Around"
Chart (2013)	Peak position
US Kid Digital Songs (Billboard)	1
US Pop Digital Songs (Billboard)	45

== Release history ==
Release dates and formats for "Like Nobody's Around"
Region	Date	Format	Label	Ref.
Various	March 23, 2013	Digital download	Nickelodeon; Columbia	
