= Music Sounds Better with U =

Single by Big Time Rush featuring Mann

from the album Elevate
- B-side: "Epic"
- Released: November 1, 2011
- Recorded: 2011
- Length: 3:09
- Label: Nickelodeon; Columbia
- Songwriters: Ryan Tedder, Thomas Bangalter, Benjamin Cohen, Brent Kutzle, Eric Bellinger, Frank Musker, Noel Zancanella, Alain Quême, Kendall Schmidt, James Maslow, Logan Henderson, Carlos PenaVega, Dominic Bugatti
- Producer: Ryan Tedder

Big Time Rush singles chronology
"Worldwide" (2011)	"Music Sounds Better with U" (2011)	"Windows Down" (2012)

Mann singles chronology
"The Mack" (2011)	"Music Sounds Better with U" (2011)	"Dance with You" (2012)

Music video
- "Music Sounds Better with U" on YouTube

"Music Sounds Better with U" is a song by American boy band Big Time Rush from their second studio album, Elevate. The song features American rapper Mann. "Music Sounds Better With U" was leaked two weeks before its official release, which was on November 1, 2011, as the first single from Elevate. Columbia Records released the song to US mainstream radio on November 15, 2011.

== Background ==
"Music Sounds Better with U" premiered via On Air with Ryan Seacrest on October 21, 2011, before it was released on November 1, as the lead single from Elevate, via digital download.

== Composition ==
The band co-wrote "Music Sounds Better with U" with Noel Zancanella, Eric Bellinger, and OneRepublic members Ryan Tedder & Brent Kutzle. Production of the song was also handled by Tedder. On Big Time Radio, it was announced that before the final cut, there were around "nine or ten versions of the song". The track covers the chorus from the 1998 single "Music Sounds Better with You" by Stardust. Logan Henderson also revealed that the track features a guitar sample from Chaka Khan.

== Critical reception ==
Jenna Hally Rubenstein of MTV stated that the track "is a beyond addictive, polished and sugary pop song that's ready for da club... Tightly layered synths and guitars pair perfectly with the track's vocals." Kevin Apaza of Directlyrics called the song "a bit generic and dated," but still had praise for the track.

== Chart performance ==
"Music Sounds Better with U" peaked at number 26 on the Billboard Mainstream Top 40 chart during a ten weeks chart run.

== Music video ==
An accompanying music video premiered on Nickelodeon on November 12, 2011.

== Track listing ==
- Digital download
1. "Music Sounds Better with U" – 3:09
- UK CD single
1. "Music Sounds Better with U" – 3:09
2. "Epic" – 3:27
3. "Music Sounds Better with U" (instrumental) – 3:02
- UK digital download
1. "Music Sounds Better with U" – 3:09
2. "Music Sounds Better with U" (instrumental) – 3:02

== Charts ==
Weekly chart performance for "Music Sounds Better with U"
Chart (2011–2012)	Peak position
US Kid Digital Song Sales (Billboard)	1
US Pop Airplay (Billboard)	26

== Release history ==
Release dates and formats for "Music Sounds Better with U"
Region	Date	Format	Label	Ref.
Austria	November 1, 2011	Digital download	Columbia	
Canada	November 1, 2011	Digital download	Columbia	
Cyprus	November 1, 2011	Digital download	Columbia	
Germany	November 1, 2011	Digital download	Columbia	
New Zealand	November 1, 2011	Digital download	Columbia	
Switzerland	November 1, 2011	Digital download	Columbia	
United States	November 1, 2011	Digital download	Columbia	
United States	November 15, 2011	Contemporary hit radio	Columbia	
United Kingdom	December 9, 2011	CD	Columbia	
United Kingdom	January 20, 2012	Digital download	Columbia	
