= Christopher Rojas =

Musician

Christopher Rojas (born 1982) is a multi-platinum composer, musician, songwriter, and record producer. He is also the co-founder of DigiTour Media.

== Career ==
He has also collaborated with several musicians and artists, including Big Time Rush, P!nk, Backstreet Boys, Heidi Montag, Tiffany Evans, Jessica Simpson, Delta Goodrem, Jamie-Lynn Sigler, Vanessa Hudgens, Corbin Bleu, and Teddy Geiger., as well as Anastacia, MC Lars, Pink, Brian Littrell.

In 2011, Rojas along with Meridith Valiando Rojas, co-founded DigiTour Media, a company that produced the world's first YouTube tour. He was then recognized by the Los Angeles Business Journal's annual "20 in their 20s" list as a notable Social Media entrepreneur in 2012.

In 2013, Rojas launched the Cyrus family YouTube channel "Seriously Cyrus" in partnership with his wife Meridith Valiando Rojas. The channel featured daily shows by various family members, including Billy Ray Cyrus and Noah Cyrus, and all programming was produced by Rojas and Valiando for their consulting company, RECon Inc.

== Partial discography ==
2001, Here to Heaven, Jamie-Lynn Sigler
2003, Peace, Jim Brickman
2003, Secret Is Out, Darryl
2004, In This Skin, Jessica Simpson
2004, Mistaken Identity, Delta Goodrem
2004, Naked Truth, Sarah Hudson
2004, Now That's What I Call Music! Vol. 16, Various Artists
2004, Now That's What I Call Music! Vol. 17, Various Artists
2004, Rejoyce: The Christmas Album, Jessica Simpson
2004, Sick and Tired [EP], Anastacia
2004, Take My Breath Away/Fly, Jessica Simpson
2005, Angels, (single) Jessica Simpson
2005, In This Skin, Jessica Simpson
2006, Never Gone, Backstreet Boys
2006, The Graduate, MC Lars
2006, Walmart Nation, MC Lars
2006, I'm Not Dead, Pink
2006, Nobody Knows, Pink
2006, Now That's What I Call Music! Vol. 22, Various Artists
2006, Now That's What I Call Music! Vol. 23, Various Artists
2006, Underage Thinking, Teddy Geiger
2006, Welcome Home, Brian Littrell
2007, Another Side, Corbin Bleu
2007, Dear Mr. President, Pink
2007, I'm Not Dead, Pink
2007, Pink Box, Pink
2008, Identified, Vanessa Hudgens
2008, Holiday Hits 2005, Vol. 5, Various Artist
2008, Pinoy Biggest Hits, Various Artists
2009, "Speak Love", (single) Hugh Sheridan
2009, "Sexy People" (single), Lolene
2010, "Electrick Hotel", Lolene
2010, "Superficial", Heidi Montag
2010, "Bittersweet" (single), Sophie Ellis-Bextor
2010, "Can I", Jaicko
2010, "B.T.R.", Big Time Rush
2010, "Daddy I'm A Rockstar", Cymphonique
2010, "I <3 U Crazy Mad", Going the Distance (film)
2011, "What Does It Take", (single) Dave Days
2011, "Supergood, Superbad", Tomohisa Yamashita
2011, "Checkmate", Namie Amuro
2011, "#1", (single) Namie Amuro
2011, "Dance With Me", (single) Justice Crew ft. Flo Rida
2011, "Worldwide", (single) Big Time Rush
2011, "Run", Jessica Mauboy
2011, "Sexy People", Bucky Larson: Born to Be a Star (film)
2011, Elevate, Big Time Rush
2013, We Are Myname, Myname
2014, "The Real Thing", (single) Femme
2014, "Come On Make It Happy", (single) Jordin Sparks, Beatrice Miller, Janel Parrish
2015, "Aurora", Iyaz
2016, "Last Text", (single) Jacob Sartorius
