= 24/Seven (album) =

Studio album by Big Time Rush
- Released: June 7, 2013
- Recorded: 2012–2013
- Genre: Pop; R&B; dance-pop
- Length: 32:49
- Label: Nickelodeon; Columbia
- Producer: Austin Bis; The Blueprint; Dan Book; Chris DeStefano; Halatrax; Alexi Misoul; OFM; Damon Sharpe; Matt Squire; The Suspex; Eric Sanicola

Big Time Rush chronology
Big Time Movie Soundtrack (2012)	24/Seven (2013)	The Greatest Hits (2016)

24/Seven is the third studio album by American boy band Big Time Rush, released on June 7, 2013, by Columbia Records. The album experiments with a dance-rock and R&B sound. The band worked with producers Matt Squire and Damon Sharpe, as they had done in the past, in an effort to mature their sound yet not stray away from their prior qualities. The four members co-wrote 13 songs (including five deluxe edition bonus tracks) with several hired songwriters. It is the last album to be released by the band before going on a long term hiatus in 2014, until they reunited in 2021.

== Background and composition ==
Beginning on April 26, 2013, Big Time Rush began releasing photos for various songs on the album via Instagram and Google Plus. The band revealed the final track listing for the album on April 29, 2013 via Entertainment Weekly.

Musically, 24/Seven marks a shift on the band's signature sound showcasing a more mature, organic and "down-to-earth pop" direction than their previous two albums, BTR and Elevate. In contrast with their past releases, the songs were written primarily by the band, with the exception of the songs "Like Nobody's Around" and "Song for You", each song on the album was either written or co-written by a member of the band. The album features duo Karmin, which appears on the track "Song for You", and rapper Jake Miller on deluxe edition bonus track "Lost in Love". The first version of the song "Love Me Again" was written by Big Time Rush, but Nickelodeon altered the song to be more "kid-friendly".

== Promotional single ==
"Like Nobody's Around" was released with the pre-order of the album on March 23, 2013. The video references other successful boy bands in past decades as The Ink Spots (1940s/1950s), The Temptations (1960s), The Jackson 5 (1970s), New Kids on the Block (1980s), Backstreet Boys (1990s) and NSYNC (2000s). The music video premiered on Nickelodeon during the 2013 Kids' Choice Awards.

== Critical reception ==
Professional ratings
Review scores
Source	Rating
AllMusic	3.5/5 stars

The album received mixed to positive reviews from critics. Matt Collar of AllMusic gave the album a 3.5 out of 5 stars. He praised the "vocal talents" of the group members and stated, "the album has a brightly positive vibe with songs about hanging out, having fun, and falling in love." He ended off stating, "Whether you’re looking for a perfect summer soundtrack or simply an album for hanging out with your friends after school, Big Time Rush's 24/Seven is round the clock fun."

== Commercial performance ==
In the United States, the album debuted at number four on the Billboard 200 chart, selling 35,000 album-equivalent units for the week ending June 29, 2013, according to Nielsen Music. However, original estimates for the album were aimed at upwards of 45,000 copies. Additionally, 24/Seven was the fourth best-selling album of the week, ranking at number four on the publication's Top Album Sales component chart. It became the group's second top-five album, following their eponymous debut album that reached a peak of number three in 2010. However, it marked the lowest first week sales for the quartet, with their previous two BTR and Elevate selling 67,000 copies and 70,000 copies in their first weeks, respectively. The following week, the record dropped 33 positions on the Billboard 200, charting at number 37 for the week ending July 6, 2013. For the next three weeks, the album continued to drop down the charts, before rising slightly from number 54 to number 50, during the week of July 27. 24/Seven was present for a total of ten consecutive weeks on the chart, before reaching its final position for the week ending August 31, being number 154. It topped Billboard's Kid Albums and Top Soundtrack charts for five consecutive weeks, becoming the "Hot Shot Debut" of the week and spending a total of 22 weeks on the component chart.

Outside of the US, 24/Seven entered the charts of many European countries. In Poland, 24/Seven peaked at number 38 according to the Polish Society of the Phonographic Industry. The album was also certified Gold in Mexico.

== Track listing ==
24/Seven – Standard edition
No.	Title	Writer(s)	Producer(s)	Length
1.	"24/Seven"	Kendall Schmidt; James Maslow; Carlos Pena, Jr.; Logan Henderson; Damon Sharpe; Jeremy Skaller; Jamil "Digi" Chammas; Justin Lucas; Nate Blasdell; Ameerah Roelants	OFM; Sharpe	3:09
2.	"Like Nobody's Around"	Jason Evigan; Mitch Allen; Emily Wright; Claude Kelly; Austin Bis	Matt Squire; The Suspex; Bis	2:56
3.	"Get Up"	Schmidt; Henderson; Matt Squire; Matt Thiessen; Nikita Konovalenko	Squire	2:57
4.	"Song for You" (featuring Karmin)	Ryan Ogren; Nick Bailey; Rami Jrade; Megan Perry; Amy Heidmann; Nick Noonan	The Blueprint	3:15
5.	"Run Wild"	Maslow; Sharpe; Eric Sanicola; Matty Nyberg	Sanicola; Sharpe	3:09
6.	"Crazy for U"	Schmidt; Sharpe; SkallerRobert Larow	OFM; Sharpe	3:07
7.	"Picture This"	Maslow; Pena Jr.; Chris DeStefano; Ashley Gorley	DeStefano; Sharpe	3:04
8.	"Confetti Falling"	Skaller; Big Time Rush; Khaled Rohaim; Rob Larow; August Rigo	OFM; Sharpe	4:03
9.	"Amazing"	Maslow; Dan Book; Alexei Misoul; Dave Katz	Book; Misoul	3:21
10.	"We Are"	Schmidt; Jeff Halavacs; Fransisca Hall	Haltrax; Sharpe	3:46
Total length:				32:48

24/Seven – Deluxe edition
No.	Title	Writer(s)	Producer(s)	Length
11.	"Love Me Again"	Big Time RushSharpe; Sanicola; Talay Riley; C.J. Holland	Sanicola; Sharpe	3:30
12.	"Just Getting Started"	Schmidt; Henderson; DeStefano; Gorley	DeStefano; Sharpe	3:02
13.	"Untouchable"	Schmidt; Henderson; Squire; Sharpe; Thiessen	Squire; Sharpe	3:20
14.	"Lost in Love" (featuring Jake Miller)	Pena Jr.; DeStefano; Miller; Shari Short	DeStefano; Sharpe	3:02
15.	"Na Na Na"	Pena Jr.; DeStefano; Gorley	DeStefano; Sharpe	3:09
Total length:				48:55

== Personnel ==
Credits from 24/Seven adapted from album liner notes.

- Mitch Allen – producer
- Austin Bisnow – producer
- The Blueprint – producer
- Dan Brook – producer
- Doug Cohn – executive in charge of music
- Chris DeStefano – producer
- Maria Egan – A&R
- Jason Evigan – producer
- Scott Fellows – executive producer
- Tim Friesen – assistant
- Tim Frisen – assistant, mixing assistant
- Serban Ghenea – mixing
- Larry Goetz – engineer
- Jeff Halatrax – producer
- Logan Henderson – vocals
- Karmin – featured artist, vocals
- Brian Malouf – mixing
- Stephen Marcussen – mastering
- Maria Paula Marulanda – art direction, design
- James Maslow – vocals
- Jake Miller – vocals
- Jared Mink – A&R
- Alexei Misoul – producer
- Michael Muller – photography
- Matt Nyberg – additional production
- OFM – producer
- Carlos Pena, Jr. – vocals
- Sean Phelan – mixing
- Gelareh Rouzbehani – A&R
- Eric Sanicola – engineer, producer
- Kendall Schmidt – vocals
- Damon Sharpe – engineer, producer
- Matt Squire – engineer, producer
- Steve Tippeconnic – engineer
- Miles Walker – mixing

== Charts ==
=== Weekly charts ===
Weekly chart performance for 24/Seven
Chart (2013)	Peak position
Austrian Albums (Ö3 Austria)	35
Belgian Albums (Ultratop Flanders)	114
Belgian Albums (Ultratop Wallonia)	124
Croatian International Albums (HDU)	24
Dutch Albums (Album Top 100)	94
German Albums (Offizielle Top 100)	42
Italian Albums (FIMI)	40
Mexican Albums (Top 100 Mexico)	1
Polish Albums (ZPAV)	38
Spanish Albums (PROMUSICAE)	87
Swiss Albums (Schweizer Hitparade)	43
US Billboard 200	4
US Kid Albums (Billboard)	1
US Soundtrack Albums (Billboard)	1

=== Year-end charts ===
Year-end chart positions for 24/Seven
Chart (2013)	Position
Argentinean Albums (CAPIF)	49
Mexican Albums (AMPROFON)	24
US Kid Albums (Billboard)	9
US Soundtrack Albums (Billboard)	14

== Certifications ==
Certifications for 24/Seven
Region	Certification	Certified units/sales
Mexico (AMPROFON)	Platinum	60,000^{^}
^{^} Shipments figures based on certification alone.

== Release history ==
Region	Date	Formats	Label
Germany	June 7, 2013	CD, download	Sony Music Entertainment, Nick, RCA Records
United Kingdom	June 10, 2013	CD, download	Sony Music Entertainment, Nick, RCA Records
Poland	June 11, 2013	CD, download	Nick, Columbia
United States	June 11, 2013	CD, download	Nick, Columbia
