= Tanya Chisholm =

American actress and dancer

- Chisholm in 2026
- Occupations: Actress, dancer
- Years active: 2006–present

Tanya Chisholm is an American actress and dancer. She is mostly known for her role as Kelly Wainwright on the Nickelodeon comedy series, Big Time Rush, and comedy film Big Time Movie. also played Marcie on the Legally Blonde spin off, Legally Blondes (otherwise known as Legally Blonde 3) alongside the film's stars, Camilla and Rebecca Rosso. She has guest-starred in shows including Cory in the House, Ghost Whisperer, and Cold Case. She also had a recurring role on Veronica Mars. Chisholm has also appeared in YouTube group, WongFuProduction's, videos such as Linappropriate, Chester See's sketch production called I Glove You, and David Choi's music video for "Won't Even Start" as an extra.

== Career ==
Chisholm is best known for playing the main 'Sharpette', Jackie, in the Disney movie High School Musical 2; the only Sharpette to appear in the film's main credits. Chisholm has done other work for Disney, including a guest role on Cory in the House, and has a supporting role in the movie Fired Up!.

Chisholm has also appeared in television series such as Veronica Mars (recurring), Ghost Whisperer (guest star), and Cold Case (guest star). She starred as Kelly Wainwright in Nickelodeon's hit series Big Time Rush. She had a recurring role in Legally Blondes (2009) as Marcie, one of Izzy and Annie's scholarship-provided friends.

Chisholm appeared in David Choi's music video "Won't Even Start" directed by Wong Fu Productions on YouTube. She appeared in the cast of Big Time Rush's Season 2 introduction scene. She also appeared in CeeLo Green"s music video "Cry Baby". She was also featured in 3 shorts from YouTubers Wong Fu Productions called The End of Wong Fu: A Christmas Story, Two Weeks Later: Resolution Fails and Linappropriate. Chisholm has been featured in Chester See's sketch production, I Glove You.

She also appears in Adam Lambert's music video "For Your Entertainment" as a dancer.

== Filmography ==
=== Film ===
Year	Title	Role	Notes
2007	High School Musical 2	Jackie	
2009	Fired Up!	Denise	
2009	Legally Blondes	Marcie	
2012	Big Time Movie	Kelly Wainwright	
2013	Saved by the Bell: The Movie	Lisa Turtle	Short
2015	Confessions of a Prodigal Son	Jenny	
2016	Diagnosis Delicious	Olivia Ross	
2017	An Accidental Zombie (Named Ted)	Bonnie	
2020	The 24th	Alice	
2021	Lost Angeles	Secretary	
2021	The Deadliest Lie	Kiki	
2021	Christmas Déjà Vu	Tracy	TV movie
2023	Dial S for Santa	Holly	TV movie

=== Television ===
Year	Title	Role	Notes
2006	Veronica Mars	Nancy Cooper	Episodes: "Welcome Wagon" and "Charlie Don't Surf"
2007	Ghost Whisperer	Kimberly Allen	Episode: "Mean Ghost"
2007	Cold Case	Crystal Stacy – 1984	Episode: "Shuffle, Ball Change"
2007	Cory in the House	Nicole	Episode: "The Presidential Seal"
2009–2013	Big Time Rush	Kelly Wainwright	Recurring role (season 1); main roles (season 2–4)
2012–2013	Figure It Out	Herself	Celebrity panelist
2013	Rizzoli & Isles	Rachel Cooper	Episode: "In Over Your Head"
2016	Bellman Chronicles: Hollywood	Lady Thug	Episode: "Keep your Baby Happy"
2017	The Josh Moore Show	Sarah	2 episodes
2022	Sistas	Jenna	4 episodes
2022	All the Queen's Men	Sonya	Episodes: "Amplified" and "Bait and Switch"
