= According to Spencer =

2001 film by Shane Edelman

- Directed by: Shane Edelman
- Written by: Marissa Ribisi; Meredith Morton; Shane Edelman
- Produced by: Ehud Bleiberg; Abra Edelman; Richard Finney; Yitzhak Ginsberg; Terence Michael; Gay Ribisi
- Starring: Jesse Bradford; Mia Kirshner; David Krumholtz; Adam Goldberg; Kendall Schmidt
- Cinematography: Amit Bhattacharya
- Edited by: Christopher L. Walter
- Music by: Buddy Judge; Patrick Warren
- Production companies: Dream Entertainment; Michael/Finney Productions
- Distributed by: Bleiberg Entertainment
- Release date: November 2, 2001
- Running time: 94 minutes
- Countries: United States; Germany
- Language: English

According to Spencer is a 2001 romantic comedy film directed by Shane Edelman and starring Jesse Bradford, Mia Kirshner, David Krumholtz, Adam Goldberg, and Brad Rowe.

== Plot ==
Spencer moves to Los Angeles where he runs into Melora, the girl he has been in love with since he was a child. Spencer is plagued by many obstacles in his new life: winning the girl of his dreams, finding success in his new job, and dealing with his two ambiguously-oriented roommates, who are obsessed with making a pornographic film and submitting it to what they believe is a contest.

== Cast ==
- Jesse Bradford as Spencer
- Mia Kirshner as Melora
- David Krumholtz
- Adam Goldberg
- Kendall Schmidt
