= Better with U Tour =

2012 concert tour by Big Time Rush

- Tour by Big Time Rush
- Promotional poster for the tour
- Location: North America
- Associated album: Elevate
- Start date: February 17, 2012
- End date: March 10, 2012
- No. of shows: 17

Big Time Rush concert chronology
- Big Time Rush in Concert (2011); Better with U Tour (2012); Big Time Summer Tour (2012)

The Better with U Tour was the second concert tour by American boy band Big Time Rush. Visiting the United States and Canada, the tour supported the band's second studio album, Elevate.

== Background ==
The band announced the tour November 2011, on On Air with Ryan Seacrest. The group stated the tour would be bigger, moving from the festival circuit, playing theaters and auditoriums. The tour also marks the band's first shows in Canada. The tour became a huge success, with shows selling out in seven major markets: Boston, Chicago, Washington, D.C., Detroit, New York City, Raleigh and Sacramento and the tour sold out in ten minutes. The band also played two festival shows, the Houston Rodeo and Mardi Gras at Universal Studios. Joining the band on tour was English-Irish boy band, One Direction, giving the band their first performances in the United States.

== Critical reception ==
The tour received positive reviews from music critics. Mark Lewis (American River Current) gave the show in Sacramento a rating of "love it" and said: "Put simply, BTR delivered on the hype that incited a crowd of young women to travel from as far as Fresno to catch a glimpse of their fresh-faced idols. Sacramento's Memorial Auditorium was filled to capacity over two hours before Kendall, James, Carlos and Logan took the stage". Carin Lane's (Times Union) eight-year-old son described the show in Albany as the "best night ever". She wrote: "These guys can sing and move, as the show was well-choreographed on a stage that included a massive, three-tiered scaffolding with ramps, a walkway, two towers and a trampoline".

== Opening act ==
- Jackson Guthy
- One Direction
- JoJo
- McClain

== Shows ==
Date (2012)	City	Country	Venue	Opening act	Attendance	Revenue
February 17	Las Vegas	United States	PH Theatre for the Performing Arts	JoJo		
February 18	Los Angeles	United States	Gibson Amphitheatre	JoJo		
February 19	San Jose	United States	Event Center Arena	JoJo; Jackson Guthy	4,131 / 4,204 (98%)	$181,395
February 20	Sacramento	United States	Sacramento Memorial Auditorium	JoJo; Jackson Guthy	—N/a	
February 22	Broomfield	United States	1stBank Center	JoJo; Jackson Guthy	—N/a	
February 24	Rosemont	United States	Akoo Theatre	One Direction; Jackson Guthy	—N/a	
February 25	Detroit	United States	Fox Theatre	One Direction; Jackson Guthy	—N/a	
February 26	Toronto	Canada	Air Canada Centre	One Direction; Jackson Guthy	6,193 / 6,193 (100%)	$269,848
February 28	Albany	United States	Palace Theatre	One Direction		
March 1	Ledyard	United States	MGM Grand Theater	One Direction; Jackson Guthy		
March 2	Fairfax	United States	Patriot Center	One Direction; Jackson Guthy	5,544 / 5,544 (100%)	$249,300
March 3	Boston	United States	Agganis Arena	One Direction		
March 4 (Note: This concert was a part of the Houston Livestock Show and Rodeo.)	Houston	United States	Reliant Stadium	McClain		
March 6	Durham	United States	Durham Performing Arts Center	One Direction; Jackson Guthy		
March 7	Nashville	United States	Bridgestone Arena	One Direction; Jackson Guthy	7,711 / 8,815 (87%)	$271,037
March 9	New York City	United States	Radio City Music Hall	One Direction; Jackson Guthy	5,922 / 5,922 (100%)	$254,602
March 10 (Note: This concert was a part of Universal Orlando Mardi Gras.)	Orlando	United States	Universal Music Plaza Stage			
Total					29,501 / 30,678 (96%)	$1,226,182
