= Elevate (Big Time Rush album) =

Studio album by Big Time Rush
- Released: November 21, 2011
- Genres: Pop; dance-pop; R&B; pop rock; dance-rock
- Length: 40:46
- Labels: Nickelodeon; Columbia
- Producers: Ryan Tedder; Noel Zancanella; Brent Kutzle; Lucas Secon; Brian Kennedy; Kay N' Dustry; Christopher "Tricky" Stewart; The-Dream; J. R. Rotem; OFM; Christopher Rojas; S*A*M and Sluggo; Cutfather; Damon Sharpe; Antario Holmes; Toby Gad; Infinity; Eric Sanicola; Jonas Jeberg; Fraser T. Smith; Johnny Powers Severin; Matt Squire; Bei Maejor; Ralph Thane; Mike Posner

Big Time Rush chronology
BTR (2010)	Elevate (2011)	Big Time Movie Soundtrack (2012)

Singles from Elevate
- 1. "Music Sounds Better with U" Released: November 1, 2011; 2. "Windows Down" Released: June 25, 2012

Elevate is the second studio album by American boy band Big Time Rush. It was released on November 21, 2011, by Columbia Records in association with Nickelodeon. The band worked with accomplished songwriters and producers for the album. These include those that assisted with the material from their debut album, such as Emanuel Kiriakou, Lindy Robbins, Nicholas Furlong, Damon Sharpe, Eric Sanicola and Lucas Secon, along with other notable songwriters and producers, such as J. R. Rotem, Christopher Stewart, The-Dream, Jay Sean, and Ryan Tedder. The production process of the album took place between nine months to a year, most of which was during their touring process.

== Background ==
The album acts as the soundtrack to the Nickelodeon television series Big Time Rush, which features songs that appeared in the series' second season and the television movie, Big Time Movie. Following the success of their first release, the band was inspired to be more involved in the writing process for this album, writing together or separately a total of eight songs. Elevate is mainly a pop-inspired dance-rock album, also showcasing soul-pop and alternative rock. The first single from Elevate, "Music Sounds Better with U", was released on November 1, 2011.

== Promotion ==
TeenNick hosted a listening party in support of the band's new album, premiering every song on the album along with playing episodes that contain songs from the album and playing the music video for the first single, "Music Sounds Better with U". Nickelodeon hosted a thirty-minute special called Big Time Rush: Music Sounds Better With U in which scenes from the band's tour and studio recording sessions are compiled together for airing. The scenes feature information about the recording and production of the album.

=== Singles ===
"Music Sounds Better with U", featuring Mann, was released as first single on November 1, 2011. The music video was released November 12, 2011 during their brand new special, Big Time Rush: Music Sounds Better With U. The second and last single was "Windows Down", released on June 25, 2012, from the re-released version.

=== Promotional singles ===
"If I Ruled the World", featuring Iyaz, was released on July 22, 2011. The music video was released July 23, 2011 and features the guys traveling and performing for their fans. It was predicted as a Future Hit by This Must Be Pop Awards. "Elevate" was released on June 1, 2012, as the second promotional single on Apple Music in the United Kingdom, containing "Blow Your Speakers" as the B-side.

=== Better With U Tour ===
A tour for the album was announced in early fall 2011, named Better with U Tour, taken from the album's first single. The tour began on February 17, 2012, in Las Vegas, Nevada and ended at Radio City Music Hall in New York City on March 9, 2012. JoJo and One Direction were the opening acts for the tour. While visiting the United Kingdom in 2012, the band revealed 4 alternate covers for the album exclusive to the country, each one featuring individual pictures of each of the members and an autograph. These Special Editions were released at the same time the regular UK edition did (February 6) and share the same track list. These special covers are presented in slipcase package.

== Critical reception ==
Professional ratings
Review scores
Source	Rating
AllMusic	3/5 stars
Common Sense Media	3/5 stars

The album received mixed to positive reviews with music critics and fans, mostly praising the production and more mature sound. Matt Collar of AllMusic stated, "the album brings to mind a mix of Maroon 5's funky soul-pop and the yearning alt-rock of OneRepublic. This is slick, well-produced pop music that, while aimed at 'tween' fans of the band's Nickelodeon TV show, has enough smart songcraft and romantic passion to appeal to even more mature fans of radio-friendly pop music." He praised songs such as "Music Sounds Better with U", "No Idea" and "Time of Our Life" calling them, "positive-minded and joyful party tracks." Jessica Dawson of Common Sense Media said, "The songs are crisper and more contemporary, letting them show off their boy-band harmonies with beats that are catchy but perhaps a bit too synthesized."

== Commercial performance ==
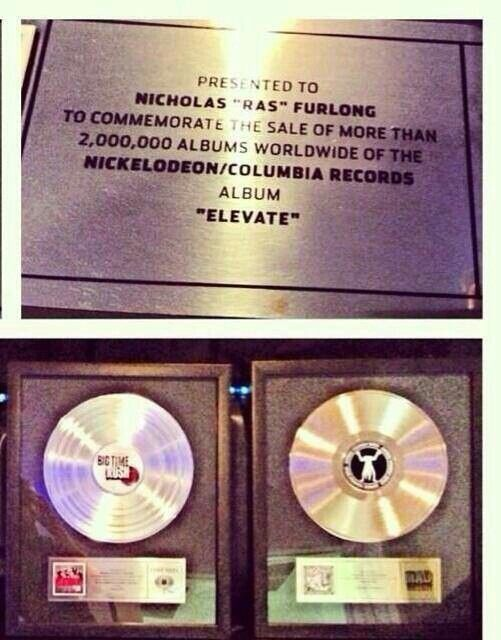
Elevate platinum record after the album sold more than 2 million units worldwide

The album debuted at number one on the iTunes album chart as well as a number 12 debut on the Billboard 200 and stayed 22 weeks on chart. In its first week, the album sold 70,000 copies. As of 2012, the album has sold 208,000 copies in the United States. The album received a Gold plaque by the Recording Industry Association of America (RIAA) for 500,000 units sales.

== Track listing ==
No.	Title	Writer(s)	Producer(s)	Length
1.	"Music Sounds Better with U" (featuring Mann)	Big Time Rush; Ryan Tedder; Thomas Bangalter; Benjamin Cohen; Alain Quême; Noel Zancanella; Brent Kutzle; Eric Bellinger; Frank Musker; Dominic Bugatti	Tedder; Zancanella; Kutzle	3:09
2.	"Show Me"	Lucas Secon; Wayne Hector; Donald McLean	Secon	2:51
3.	"All Over Again"	Brian Seals; Damon Sharpe; Drew Ryan Scott	Brian Kennedy	3:37
4.	"No Idea"	Alexander Gaskarth; Terius Nash; Christopher "Tricky" Stewart	Stewart; The-Dream	4:59
5.	"Cover Girl"	Kendall Schmidt; Toby Gad; Lindy Robbins	Gad	3:00
6.	"Love Me Love Me"	Big Time Rush; Christopher Rojas; Damon Sharpe; Ole Broderson; Mich Hansen; Kasper Larsen	Sharpe; Cutfather; Rojas; Kay N' Dustry	3:01
7.	"If I Ruled the World" (featuring Iyaz)	Emanuel Kiriakou; Evan Bogart; Robbins	Kiriakou	3:00
8.	"Invisible"	Carlos Pena; Charley Greenberg; Cody Williams; Daniel Andrew Wayne; J. R. Rotem	Rotem	3:20
9.	"Time of Our Life"	Logan Henderson; Nicholas RAS Furlong; Jordan Suecof; Antario Holmes	Infinity; Holmes	3:27
10.	"Superstar"	Big Time Rush; Jay Sean; Bobby Bass; J-Remy; Jared Cotter; Khaled Rohaim	OFM	3:23
11.	"You're Not Alone"	Schmidt; Steven Batty; Carlos Batty; Rojas	Rojas	3:53
12.	"Elevate"	James Maslow; Sharpe; Johnny Powers Severin; Eric Sanicola	Sharpe; Johnny Powers Severin; Sanicola	3:06
Total length:				40:46

iTunes Store edition bonus track
No.	Title	Writer(s)	Producer(s)	Length
13.	"Blow Your Speakers"	Matt Palmer; Pascal Guyon	Fraser T. Smith	3:12

United Kingdom edition bonus track
No.	Title	Writer(s)	Length
13.	"Epic"	Marlin Donnell Bonds; Jonas Jeberg; Maslow; ReddStylez	3:26

BTRBand.com pre-order edition bonus download
No.	Title	Writer(s)	Producer(s)	Length
13.	"Paralyzed"	Matt Squire; Pierre Bouvier; Charles Comeau	Squire	3:11

2012 reissue bonus track
No.	Title	Writer(s)	Producer(s)	Length
13.	"Windows Down"	Alexander James; Brandon Green; Damon Albarn; Dave Rowntree; Graham Coxon; Kesha Sebert; Squire; Matthew Musto; Mike Posner; Ralph Thane	Bei Maejor; Squire; Thane	3:13

== Charts ==
=== Weekly charts ===
Weekly chart performance for Elevate
Chart (2011–2015)	Peak position
Austrian Albums (Ö3 Austria)	32
Belgian Albums (Ultratop Wallonia)	189
Croatian International Albums (HDU)	16
German Albums (Offizielle Top 100)	33
Irish Albums (IRMA)	61
Italian Albums (FIMI)	29
Mexican Albums (AMPROFON)	13
Polish Albums (ZPAV)	16
Scottish Albums (Official Charts)	99
Swiss Albums (Schweizer Hitparade)	76
UK Albums (Official Charts)	72
US Billboard 200	12
US Kid Albums (Billboard)	1
US Soundtrack Albums (Billboard)	1

=== Year-end charts ===
Year-end chart positions for Elevate
Chart (2012)	Position
US Billboard 200	116
US Kid Albums (Billboard)	2
US Soundtrack Albums (Billboard)	4

== Certifications ==
Certifications for Elevate
Region	Certification	Certified units/sales
United States (RIAA)	Gold	500,000^{‡}
^{‡} Sales+streaming figures based on certification alone.

== Release history ==
Region	Date	Formats	Label
Various	November 18, 2011	CD, digital download	Sony Music Entertainment, Nick, Columbia
United Kingdom	February 6, 2012	CD, digital download	Sony Music Entertainment, Nick, RCA
Japan	January 6, 2012	Digital download	Sony Music Entertainment Japan, Nick
Philippines	March 17, 2012	CD	Sony Music Entertainment, Nick, Columbia, Ivory Music & Video (distributor)
United States	November 21, 2011	CD, digital download	Nick, Columbia
