= Todd Ballard =

- Also known as: Todd Ballard
- Born: Michael Todd Ballard; 1973 (age 51–52); Henderson, Kentucky
- Origin: Lexington, Kentucky
- Genres: CCM, worship
- Occupations: Singer, songwriter, worship leader
- Instruments: vocals, guitar
- Years active: 2013–present
- Website: toddballard.com

Michael Todd Ballard (born 1973) is a former American Christian musician, worship leader, and guitarist, who primarily played a contemporary Christian style of worship music. His first and only studio album, Anthems, was released in 2013. He now serves as Executive Director at Camp Timber-lee in East Troy, WI.

== Early life ==
Michael Todd Ballard, son of a preacher, was born in 1973 and grew up in Henderson, Kentucky, where he was a 1991 graduate of Henderson County High School.

== Music career ==
His music recording career began in 2013, with the studio album, Anthems released independently on February 5, 2013.

== Personal life ==
Ballard resides in Williams Bay, Wisconsin with his wife, Cindy, and their two children. He serves as Executive Director at Camp Timber-lee, a Christian Youth Camp in East Troy, Wisconsin. He was previously the worship leader at Red Rocks Church in Colorado, for ten years.

== Discography ==
Albums

- Anthems (February 9, 2013)
