= Big Time Movie =

2012 American television movie

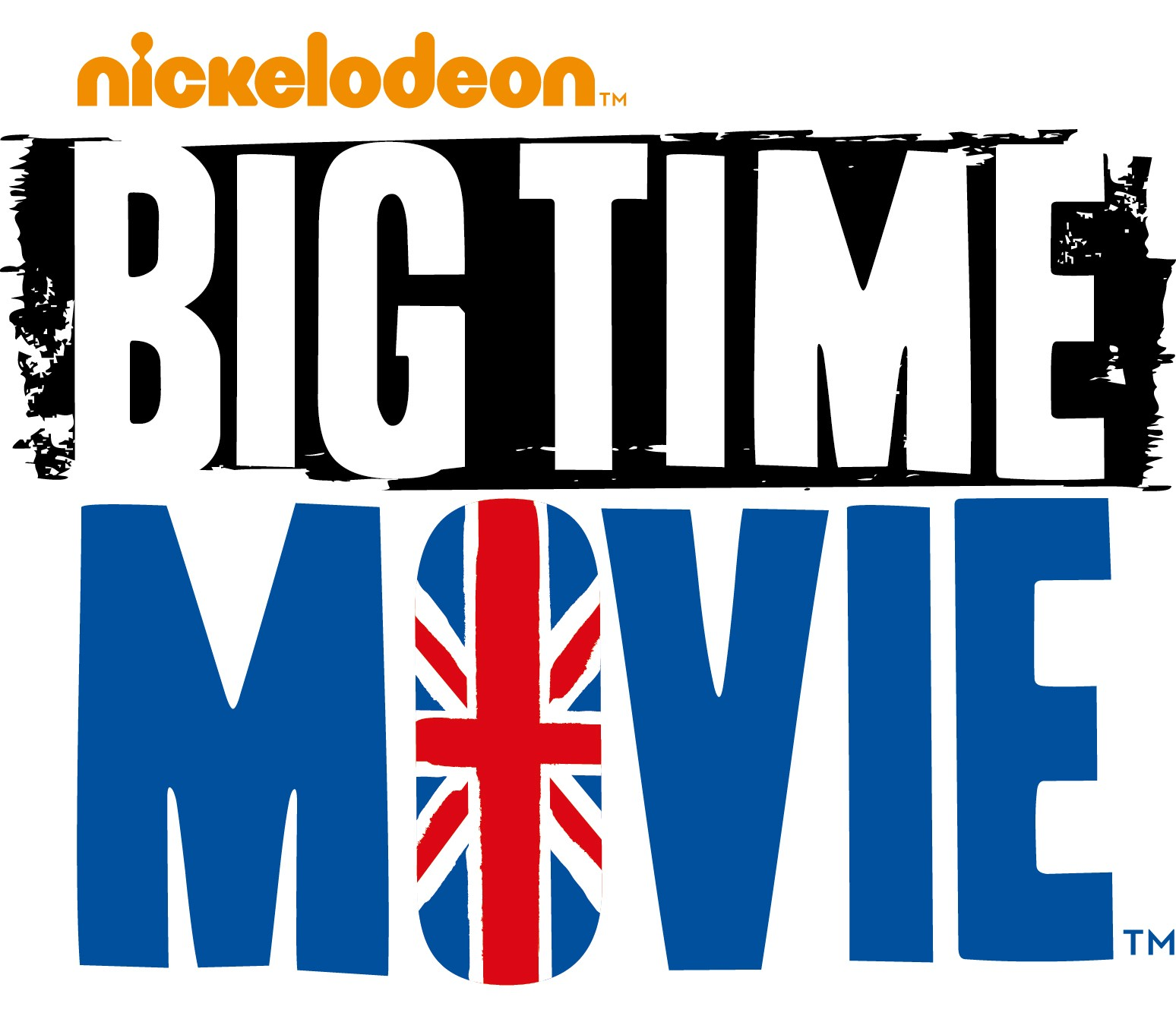
- Logo
- Genre: Comedy; Spy film Action film Musical; Buddy film
- Based on: Big Time Rush by Scott Fellows
- Written by: Scott Fellows
- Directed by: Savage Steve Holland
- Starring: Kendall Schmidt; James Maslow; Carlos Pena Jr.; Logan Henderson; Ciara Bravo; Stephen Kramer Glickman; Tanya Chisholm
- Theme music composer: Guy Moon
- Countries of origin: Canada; United States
- Original language: English

Production
- Producers: Scott McAboy; Amy Sydorick
- Cinematography: Rick Maguire
- Editor: Stewart Schill
- Running time: 68 minutes
- Production companies: Jackie Mackie Pictures; Pacific Bay Entertainment Canada
- Budget: $3.4 million

Original release
- Network: Nickelodeon
- Release: March 10, 2012

Big Time Movie (also known as Big Time Rush: The Movie) is a 2012 musical comedy television film based on the Nickelodeon television series, Big Time Rush and the songs of the Beatles, which aired on March 10, 2012, in the United States. It features the members of Big Time Rush (a.k.a. the TV show and the band members) visiting London for their world tour, where they also have to save the world.

Big Time Movie has been viewed by over 13.1 million viewers in the USA, and become the most-watched Nickelodeon original movie in Nickelodeon Latin America.

A second film for Paramount+ is in the early stages of development as of 2025, according to the band.

== Plot ==
Big Time Rush (Kendall Knight, James Diamond, Carlos Garcia, and Logan Mitchell) are traveling to London for the first stop on their world tour alongside their manager Gustavo Rocque, his assistant Kelly Wainwright, Kendall’s younger sister Katie, and their mother Jennifer. Asleep on the plane, Carlos has a dream in which the boys as spies rescue a princess from a maniacal villain in a scenario similar to a spy movie while singing the song “Help!” by the Beatles. He tells the others about his dream, but they do not believe that something like that could actually happen. Meanwhile, Katie wishes to become a princess while Gustavo worries that the boys are going to ruin their world tour.

At the baggage claim in the airport, MI6 agent Simon Lane secretly switches his backpack with an identical one owned by Kendall just before he is captured by henchmen working for evil airline mogul Sir Atticus Moon. When MI6 finds out about this, Lane’s superior Number One sends agents to capture the boys.

Big Time Rush checks in at the Queen’s Hotel, unknowingly foiling the agents’ attempts to capture them. Opening the backpack in their suite, the boys discover the “Beetle”, a gravity-reversing device that Lane stole from Moon. They are then confronted in succession by MI6, a mysterious young woman in leather, and a pair of inept Swedish spies named Sven and Rikard before fleeing with the Beetle. Meanwhile, Gustavo and Kelly are under fire from their famous tour promoter due to the boys trashing their suite and being late for their soundcheck. The two are then arrested by MI6 and tortured (via being prodded and forced to listen to a tone-deaf Japanese singer) when Number One mistakes them for criminals after watching hotel security footage of Gustavo metaphorically saying that the band will “take over the world”. Elsewhere, Katie conspires to become a princess by setting up her mother with the “Duke of Bath”, only later discovering that he is actually just the owner of a toilet-supplies chain with a royal theme.

Finding themselves on the run from Moon's henchmen and the British police, the boys are saved by the woman in leather, revealed to be Lane’s daughter Penny. As they escape the police and the Swedish spies using her AI-equipped van V.A.N,. Penny explains that she intends to personally rescue her father from Moon. To this end, she arranges a meeting with Moon in Hyde Park to exchange the Beetle for her father’s safety. Donning disguises, the five evade the police, the Swedish spies, and BTR’s fans before getting to the park just in time for the boys to sing the Beatles’ “We Can Work It Out” at their soundcheck. They then meet with Moon and his men in the park, narrowly escaping with both the Beetle and Agent Lane. Meanwhile, MI6 realizes that Gustavo and Kelly are innocent and, threatened with an international incident, unceremoniously dumps them in the wilderness.

Big Time Rush, Penny, and Agent Lane hide out in the latter’s secret underground spy lair. Agent Lane explains the earlier bag switch and prepares to take the Beetle to MI6 to clear the boys’ names, but is knocked unconscious when Logan accidentally shoots him with a dart gun disguised as a pen. Moon kidnaps Katie (dressed as a princess) and uses her as leverage to extort the boys into giving him the Beetle, which he intends to use to power a laser that will push the moon out of orbit, thus causing massive natural disasters that will force the nations of the world to surrender to him. The Beetle is then stolen by Sven and Rikard, who are then immediately kidnapped by Moon’s henchmen.

As the MI6 agents realize Moon’s plan (but are helpless to stop it due to his jamming their communication signals), the boys and Penny storm the villain’s castle, free Katie (and Sven and Rikard), and deactivate the laser. Moon brings Katie out onto the lawn at gunpoint and demands the Beetle. Kendall makes it look like he is going to hand it over, but he and Katie trick Moon; she stomps on his foot while Kendall throws the Beetle onto Moon’s back, causing him to helplessly levitate into the sky. MI6 then arrives to arrest Moon and his henchmen. Grateful for the boys’ help, Number One agrees to let them use an MI6 helicopter to get to Hyde Park in time for their concert, where they sing the Beatles’ “A Hard Day’s Night” as well as their own song “Elevate”. Stumbling upon the concert, Gustavo and Kelly are overjoyed to see that the boys made it on time.

After the concert, Gustavo finally allows the boys to go sightseeing in London. When the boys realize that they do not have a ride, Penny and Agent Lane arrive in V.A.N. to pick them up. Preparing for another spy adventure, the boys get in the van and ride off into the night.

== Cast ==
- Kendall Schmidt as Kendall Knight, the levelheaded leader of Big Time Rush.
- James Maslow as James Diamond, the vain and image-obsessed member of the band who quickly develops a crush on Penny.
- Carlos Pena Jr. as Carlos Garcia, the wild and reckless member of the band whose dream loosely predicts much of the film’s story.
- Logan Henderson as Logan Mitchell, the smart and high-strung member of the band. In a running gag, he is knocked out with tranquilizer darts multiple times throughout the film.
- Ciara Bravo as Katie Knight, Kendall’s scheming little sister who wants to become a princess.
- Challen Cates as Jennifer Knight, Kendall’s and Katie’s mother.
- Stephen Kramer Glickman as Gustavo Rocque, the band’s volatile manager.
- Tanya Chisholm as Kelly Wainwright, Gustavo’s more levelheaded assistant.
- Emma Lahana as Penelope “Penny” Lane, a young spy.
- Trevor Devall as Sir Atticus Moon, a flamboyant billionaire businessman and the film’s main antagonist.
- Christopher Shyer as Agent Simon Lane, Penny’s father and a James Bond-esque MI6 agent.
- Tahmoh Penikett as Agent A, an MI6 agent sent to stop the boys.
- Gerard Plunkett as the “Duke of Bath”, a toilet salesman whom Katie mistakes for royalty.
- Garry Chalk as Number One, Agent Lane’s somewhat inept superior at MI6.
- Emily Holmes as Number Two, Number One’s beleaguered second-in-command.
- Alex Zahara and Michael Adamthwaite as Sven and Rikard, a pair of dimwitted Swedish spies also seeking the Beetle.
- John DeSantis as Maxwell, Moon’s silent henchman who has a silver hammer for a hand (a reference to the Beatles song “Maxwell's Silver Hammer”).

The film’s cast also includes Melissa Roxburgh as the princess whom the boys save in Carlos’s dream, Teach Grant as the concert promoter, Rukiya Bernard as a woman whose dog chases Kendall and Logan at a dog park, Panou as one of Moon’s henchmen, and Ted Whittall as the Duke of Sandwich, a nobleman whom Mrs. Knight mistakes for a sandwich salesman. Newscaster Mi-Jung Lee also appears as herself. Daran Norris, who plays the character Buddha Bob on the show, is uncredited as the voice of V.A.N.

== Release ==
The film premiered on March 9, 2012, in Canada, and on May 26, 2012, in the United Kingdom and Ireland. Big Time Movie averaged 4.1 million total viewers and ranked as the week's (3/4/12-3/11/12) number-one telecast with kids 2-11 (6.1/2.2 million), kids 6-11 (8.9/1.9 million) and tweens 9-14 (8.2/1.7 million). Over the whole weekend, Big Time Movie reached over 13.1 million total viewers.

The film was released on DVD on August 28, 2012, as a double feature with Rags.

== Soundtrack ==
The Big Time Movie Soundtrack is the official soundtrack of the movie which features six songs from the Beatles. It was released on March 6, 2012. Because it sold over 10,000 copies in its first week, it debuted at number 44 on the Top 200 charts in March and also reached number 2 on the iTunes Pop Albums chart.

=== Track listing ===
The movie contains cover versions of several songs from the Beatles:

- "Help!"
- "We Can Work It Out"
- "Revolution"
- "A Hard Day's Night"

== Accolades ==
The movie received a nomination at the 65th Directors Guild of America Awards for Outstanding Directing in a Children's Program.
