= Scott Fellows =

American producer, screenwriter, and director

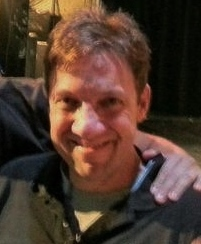
- Fellows in 2016
- Education: Arizona State University
- Occupations: Television producer; director; screenwriter
- Years active: 1991–present
- Known for: Johnny Test; The Fairly OddParents; Ned's Declassified School Survival Guide; Big Time Rush; Supernoobs

Scott Fellows is an American film and television producer, director and screenwriter. Specializing in children's television series, he is known for creating the Nickelodeon shows Ned's Declassified School Survival Guide and Big Time Rush, as well as the Cartoon Network (originally Kids' WB) show Johnny Test and its 2021 Netflix reboot.

== Career ==
Fellows is the creator and executive producer of Nickelodeon's Ned's Declassified School Survival Guide, Kids WB!, Teletoon, Cartoon Network and Netflix's Johnny Test, and Nickelodeon's hit Kid's Choice Award-winning TV series Big Time Rush. 100 Things to Do Before High School was premiered on Nickelodeon in 2015. His second animated series, Supernoobs, premiered on Cartoon Network in 2015. He also served as the showrunner and executive producer on the reboot series of The Adventures of Rocky and Bullwinkle, produced by Jay Ward Productions and DreamWorks Animation Television, which premiered on Amazon Prime in 2018.

Fellows had been previously working as a staff writer and executive producer on The Fairly OddParents. He also wrote some episodes of Recess. His earlier writing credits also include episodes of Weinerville (where he performed Zip, Louie, and Professor Phosphate), U to U, All That, 100 Deeds for Eddie McDowd, Doug, and the unaired pilot for I Don't Think So.

== Filmography ==
=== TV series ===
Series	Original run	Notes	Description
Ned's Declassified School Survival Guide	Nickelodeon (2004–2007)	Creator, Writer, & Executive Producer	Ned's Declassified School Survival Guide, commonly called "Ned's Declassified", is an American live-action situation comedy on Nickelodeon that debuted in the channel's Sunday night TEENick scheduling block on September 12, 2004. It follows the lives of Ned, Cookie and Moze, three best friends, and their adventures/misadventures in James K. Polk Middle School. The school lunch is alive, the teachers are crazy, and the janitor, Gordy, has never cleaned anything in his life, yet still has a job at the school. The show deals with social problems, as well as academic subjects like friends, lockers, projects, social studies, tests, etc. Each episode focuses on one main issue students normally encounter while providing tips on how to handle these situations. The series' actual pilot episode aired on September 7, 2003, without many of the current version's main characters. The main series finale television movie aired on June 8, 2007. In November 2006, the series won the Global Entertainment Award for best kids' programming of the millennium, in a ceremony held in Copenhagen, Denmark. This is a first for a live action series that he created.
Johnny Test	Kids' WB (2005–2008); Cartoon Network (2009–2014) Netflix (2021–2022)	Creator, Writer: Story, Producer (Season 1), Executive Producer (Seasons 2 onwards), Story Editor, & Songwriter	Johnny Test is an American-Canadian animated television series. The series follows on an 11-year-old boy named Johnny Test who goes on adventures with his talking dog, Dukey, as they cause chaos and mischief around the fictional city of Porkbelly. The show first aired on September 17, 2005, on Kids WB!, January 26, 2006, on Cartoon Network UK, October 28, 2006, on Teletoon and finally January 7, 2008, on Cartoon Network. It was later picked up by Netflix in 2021. This is the first animated series that Scott Fellows created. It continues to air re-runs globally.
Big Time Rush	Nickelodeon (2009–2013)	Creator, Writer, Executive Producer, Director, Additional Music Composer	Big Time Rush centers around four teenage best friends from Minnesota who get the chance to live it up in Los Angeles and become the next hit-making boy band after getting a deal with record producer "Gustavo Rocque" (Stephen Kramer Glickman). As they seize this opportunity of a lifetime, these friends embark on an exciting comedy and music-filled journey to prove to themselves and their record label that they're serious about their new career choice. They are accompanied by Kendall's mom, Mrs. Knight (Challen Cates) and his little sister, Katie Knight (Ciara Bravo). The pilot episode aired on November 28, 2009, while the series debuted on Monday January 18, 2010, to 7.1 million viewers. The show hit a high note as it became the highest-rated live-action premiere in Nickelodeon history. In October 2010, the series received an Australian Kids Choice Award for Favorite TV Show, and has been nominated for other multiple award categories since then. The series concluded on July 25, 2013, after four years on television, although the band continued to perform for a few months before going on a hiatus.
100 Things to Do Before High School	Nickelodeon (2014–2016)	Creator, Writer, Executive Producer, & Theme Music Composer	100 Things to Do Before High School follows C.J., Fenwick, and Crispo, 3 kids in middle school. C.J. thought high school was all fun, but she gets a rude awakening, realizing everything will change.
Supernoobs	Cartoon Network (2015–2016); Hulu (2017–2019)	Creator, Developer, Writer, Executive Producer, & Theme Music Composer	Supernoobs centers around Kevin, Tyler, Shope, and the Roach. It premiered on November 2, 2015, on Cartoon Network in the United Kingdom and Ireland.
The Adventures of Rocky and Bullwinkle	Amazon Prime (2018–2019)	Writer, Executive Producer (alongside Tiffany Ward)	The Adventures of Rocky and Bullwinkle is a reboot of the 1959–64 animated television series.

=== Film ===
TV movies	Original run	Notes	Description
A Fairly Odd Movie: Grow Up, Timmy Turner!	Nickelodeon (2011)	Co-Writer, with Butch Hartman	This is a live-action television movie based on the animated series, The Fairly OddParents, created by Butch Hartman.
Big Time Movie	Nickelodeon (2012)	Series Based on, Writer, & Executive Producer	This is a television movie based on Big Time Rush and the first movie that Scott Fellows created.

=== List of The Fairly OddParents episodes written by Scott Fellows ===
- "Love Struck!"
- "Cosmo Con"
- "Odd Jobs"
- "Movie Magic"
- "Sleepover and Over"
- "Mother Nature"
- "Most Wanted Wish"
- "This is Your Wish"
- "Beddy Bye"
- "Kung Timmy"
- "Pipe Down!"
- "Odd Ball"
- "Snow Bound"
- "Miss Dimmsdale"
- "Hard Copy"
- "Lights...Camera...Adam!"
- "Baby Face"
- "Power Pals"
- "Fairy Friends & Neighbors!"
- "Just the Two of Us!"
- "Wish Fixers"
- "Beach Bummed!"
- "Catman Meets the Crimson Chin"
- "Nega-Timmy"
- "You Doo!"
- "Just Desserts!"
- "Blondas Have More Fun!"
- "Five Days of F.L.A.R.G."
- "Escape from Unwish Island"
- "The Masked Magician"
- "Fairly OddBaby"
- "Mission: Responsible"
- "The Fairly Oddlympics"
- "Odd Squad"
- "Cheese & Crockers"
- "Merry Wishmas"
- "The End of the Universe-ity"
- "Poof's Playdate"
- "Dread 'n' Breakfast"
- "Wishology! The Big Beginning"
- "Wishology! The Exciting Middle Part"
- "Wishology! The Final Ending"
