= Kendall Schmidt =

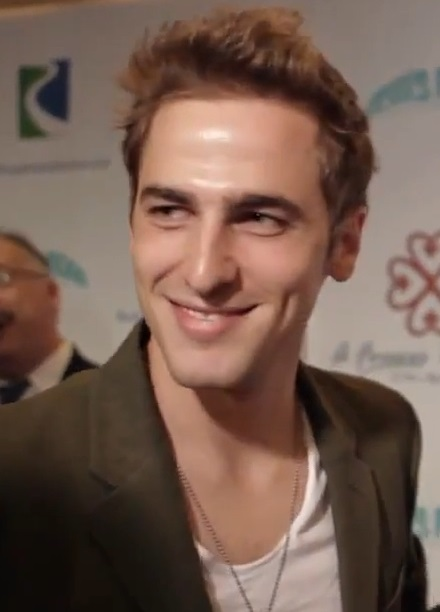
- Schmidt in 2013

Background information
- Born: Kendall Francis Schmidt; November 2, 1990 (age 36); Wichita, Kansas, U.S.
- Genre: Pop
- Occupations: Singer; songwriter; music producer; actor
- Instruments: Vocals; guitar; piano
- Years active: 1995–present
- Label: TOLBooth
- Member of: Big Time Rush
- Formerly of: Heffron Drive
- Website: heffrondrive.com

Kendall Francis Schmidt (born November 2, 1990) is an American singer, songwriter, music producer and actor. He played Kendall Knight in Big Time Rush, participated in a boy band with the same name, and has had small roles on TV shows such as ER, Without a Trace, Phil of the Future, Ghost Whisperer, Gilmore Girls, and Frasier.

== Early life ==
Schmidt was born in Wichita, Kansas, to Kathy and Kent Schmidt. His brothers, Kenneth Schmidt and Kevin Schmidt, are actors. He began his acting career at age five, appearing in a Chex TV commercial. When he was nine years old, he was one of two young actors who were hired to be Haley Joel Osment's stand-in and body double (they shared the same agent) in the Steven Spielberg film, A.I. Artificial Intelligence. He celebrated his birthday on the set, and Spielberg and the cast surprised him with a birthday cake decorated with Star Wars figures. When he was 10 years old, his family finally made the move from Kansas to California.

== Career ==
=== 2001–2013: Career beginning and Big Time Rush ===
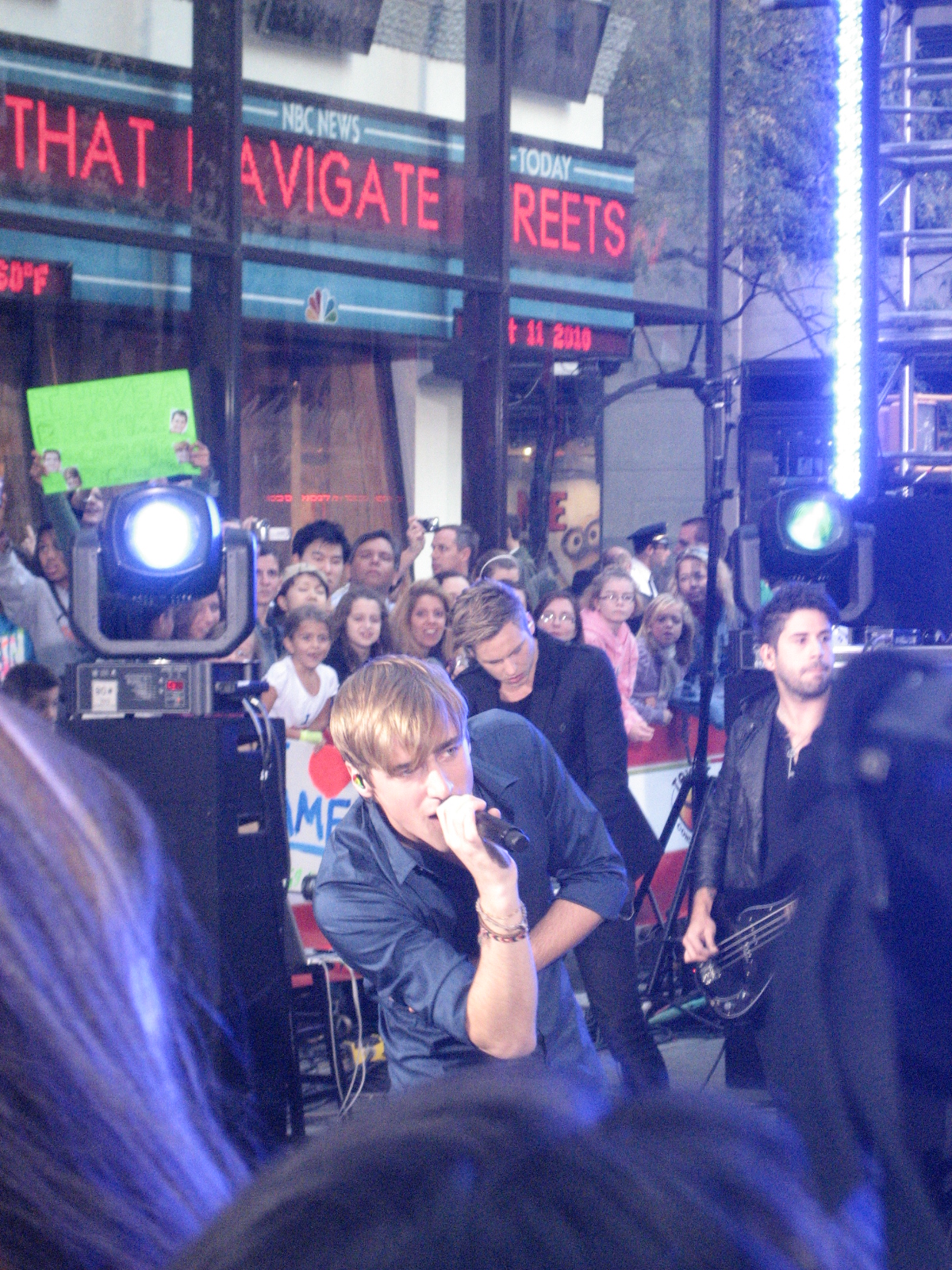
Schmidt performing in New York City, 2010

In 2001, Schmidt landed recurring roles on General Hospital, Titus, Raising Dad, Gilmore Girls and CSI: Miami. He guest-starred on a variety of TV shows, including ER, MADtv, Frasier and Phil of the Future. Most recently, Kendall guest starred on Without a Trace and Ghost Whisperer. On the big screen, he has appeared in Minority Report and According to Spencer.

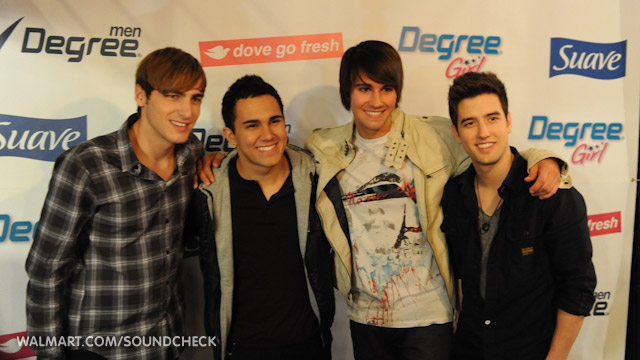
Schmidt (left) beside his co-stars for Big Time Rush, Carlos PenaVega, James Maslow and Logan Henderson

In 2009, Schmidt made his career breakthrough while he was cast as the lead in the Nickelodeon television series Big Time Rush, Kendall Knight. Kendall portrays a character who is the strongest, fastest, smartest and successful member of Big Time Rush. He also was a member of the real-life boy band Big Time Rush, formed as the part of a show. Nickelodeon signed the group, and their debut album, titled BTR, was released on October 11, 2010. The album debuted at number 3 on the Billboard 200 and was later certified Gold by the RIAA for shipments of 500,000 copies in the U.S. In November 2010, it was announced that a Christmas special of Big Time Rush would debut later that month, and that a Christmas EP would be released to coincide with the episode. On November 30, 2010, they released the Holiday EP Holiday Bundle, with two songs: "Beautiful Christmas" and the cover of "All I Want for Christmas is You", originally performed by Mariah Carey. On February 15, 2011, "Boyfriend" was released as the band's first official single to mainstream US radio and peaked at number seventy-two on the Billboard Hot 100, becoming their most successful song to date.

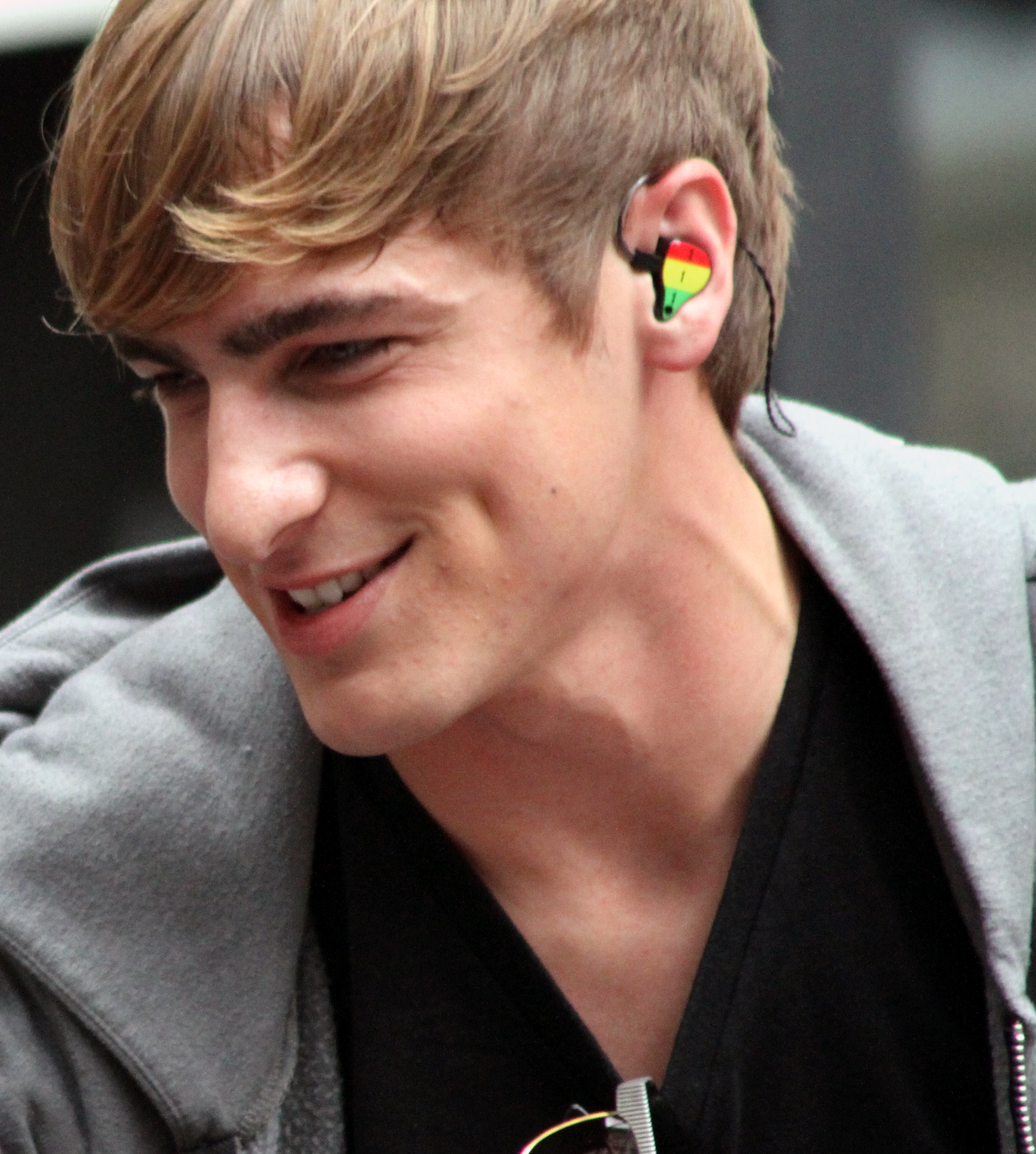
Schmidt in 2010

Schmidt and the group announced they would be recording their second studio album, just after Nickelodeon renewed the series for a third season. Their second album, Elevate, was released on November 21, 2011, and debuted at number 12 on the Billboard 200, selling over 70,000 copies in its first week. Though for a lower peaking than their previous, the album sold more copies than the previous album. The first single, "Music Sounds Better with U", was released on November 1, 2011. He announced would be starring in their full-length 2012 film, Big Time Movie.

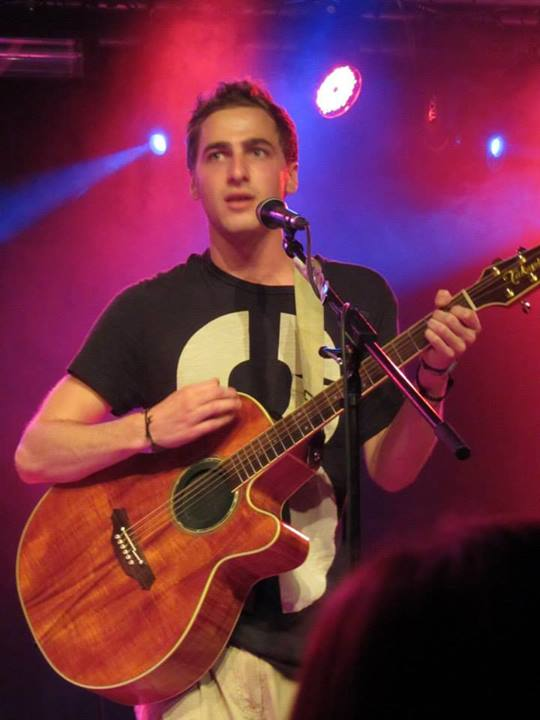
Schmidt in 2014

In 2013 Nickelodeon renewed the Big Time Rush series for a 13-episode fourth season, production started on January 7. The third album, 24/Seven, was released on June 11, 2013, and led many critics to draw comparisons between the band's third album and NSYNC's third album Celebrity. The band went on hiatus in March, 2014.

=== 2013–present: Heffron Drive and reunion with Big Time Rush ===
He announced that he returned to the duo Heffron Drive, which he had before Big Time Rush. Schmidt's first single with Heffron Drive, "Parallel", was released in March 2014 through his very own record label TOLBooth Records. On January 14, 2017, the band released a new song and music video for their single Living Room. Their next release was on January 19, 2018, when they released a new song and music video titled "Mad At The World". Their latest release is "Separate Lives" from their second album Separate Lives.

On April 20, 2020, Kendall reunited virtually with his former members as they uploaded a video on the band's social media platforms, sharing some wishes to their fans about the COVID-19 pandemic. They officially reunited in 2021. The group released their fourth studio album Another Life on June 2, 2023.

== Personal life ==
Kendall Schmidt got engaged to his girlfriend of seven years, Mica Von Turkovich, on June 30, 2022; the couple later married. On November 23, 2023, Schmidt and Von Turkovich announced her pregnancy with their first child via Instagram. They announced the birth of their daughter Maple on Instagram in March 2024.

== Filmography ==
=== Films ===
Year	Title	Role	Notes
2001	According to Spencer	Chad	
2012	Big Time Movie	Kendall Knight	
2015	Janoskians: Untold and Untrue	Himself	

=== Television ===
Year	Title	Role	Notes
2001	Raising Dad	Noah	Episode: "For Mature Audiences Only"
2001; 2002	Gilmore Girls	Peter	Episodes: "Nick & Nora/Sid & Nancy" and "Application Anxiety"
2002	Frasier	Young Frasier	Episode: "Rooms with a View"
2004	ER	Damian	Episode: "Shifts Happen"
2004	Phil of the Future	Jake	Episode: "Get Ready to Go-Go"
2004	CSI: Miami	Dominic Abeyta	Episodes: "Legal" and Hell Night"
2009	Ghost Whisperer	Jeff	Episode: "Slow Burn"
2009	Without a Trace	Shay Hanson	Episode: "True"
2009–2013	Big Time Rush	Kendall Knight	Main role
2011	Hand aufs Herz	Himself	Episode: "August 11, 2011"
2012	How to Rock	Himself	Episode: "How to Rock: An Election"
2013	Marvin Marvin	Himself	Episode: "Big Time Marvin"
2014	Hell's Kitchen	Himself	Episode: "15 Chefs Compete"
2015	The Penguins of Madagascar	Beaver Kendall (voice)	Episode: "Tunnel of Love"
2016; 2018	School of Rock	Justin Cole	Recurring role (season 1); guest (season 2)

=== Web ===
Year	Title	Role	Notes
2008–2011	Poor Paul	John	Main role
2017	Are You There, God? It's Me, Margot	Ryan	Main role

== Discography ==
=== Singles ===
List of singles as lead artist, with selected chart positions, showing year released and album name
Title	Year	Peak chart positions	Album
Title	Year	US AC	Album
"Blame It on the Mistletoe"	2014	27	Non-album singles
"Shattered"	2025	—	Non-album singles
"Honeydew"	2025	—	Non-album singles
"Any Less"	2026	—	Non-album singles
"Good Love"	2026	—	Non-album singles
"Satellites"	2026	To be released	Non-album singles
"—" denotes a recording that did not chart.

=== Albums appearances ===
Year	Title	Other artist(s)	Album
2015	"Night Like This"	Hilary Duff	Breathe In. Breathe Out.

=== Writing credits ===
Year	Title	Artist(s)	Album	Notes
2012	"Music Sounds Better with U"	Big Time Rush	Elevate	Written
2012	"Cover Girl"	Big Time Rush	Elevate	Written
2012	"Love Me, Love Me"	Big Time Rush	Elevate	Written
2012	"Superstar"	Big Time Rush	Elevate	Written
2012	"You're Not Alone"	Big Time Rush	Elevate	Written
2013	"24/Seven"	Big Time Rush	24/Seven	Written
2013	"Get Up"	Big Time Rush	24/Seven	Written
2013	"Crazy for U"	Big Time Rush	24/Seven	Written
2013	"We Are"	Big Time Rush	24/Seven	Written
2013	"Confetti Falling"	Big Time Rush	24/Seven	Written
2013	"Love Me Again"	Big Time Rush	24/Seven	Written
2013	"Just Getting Started"	Big Time Rush	24/Seven	Written
2013	"Untouchable"	Big Time Rush	24/Seven	Written
2014	"Happy Mistakes"	Heffron Drive	Happy Mistakes	Writer, producer, executive producer
2014	"Parallel"	Heffron Drive	Happy Mistakes	Writer, producer, executive producer
2014	"One Way Ticket"	Heffron Drive	Happy Mistakes	Writer, producer, executive producer
2014	"Division of the Heart"	Heffron Drive	Happy Mistakes	Writer, producer, executive producer
2014	"Had to Be Panama"	Heffron Drive	Happy Mistakes	Writer, producer, executive producer
2014	"Nicotine"	Heffron Drive	Happy Mistakes	Writer, producer, executive producer
2014	"Art of Moving On"	Heffron Drive	Happy Mistakes	Writer, producer, executive producer
2014	"Passing Time"	Heffron Drive	Happy Mistakes	Writer, producer, executive producer
2014	"Could You Be Home"	Heffron Drive	Happy Mistakes	Writer, producer, executive producer
2014	"That's What Makes You Mine"	Heffron Drive	Happy Mistakes	Writer, producer, executive producer
2014	"Everything Has Changed"	Heffron Drive	Happy Mistakes	Writer, producer, executive producer
2014	"3 2 1"	Shinee	I'm Your Boy	Writer
