= Carlos PenaVega =

American actor & singer (born 1989)

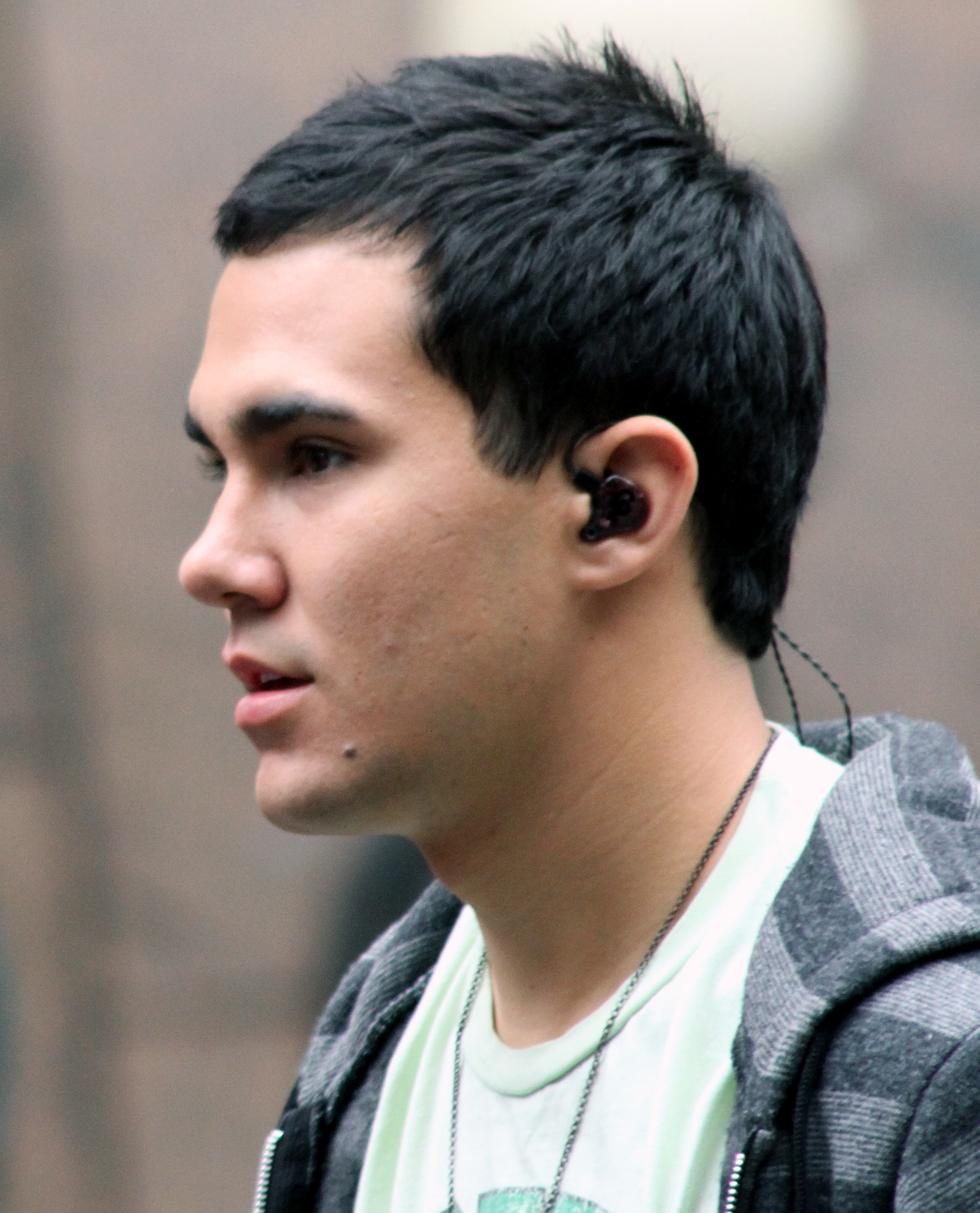
- PenaVega in 2010
- Born: Carlos Roberto Pena Jr. August 15, 1989 (age 37); Columbia, Missouri, U.S.
- Occupations: Actor; singer
- Years active: 2004–present
- Spouse: Alexa Vega (m. 2014)
- Children: 4 (Note: Including 1 stillborn.)
- Musical career
- Genre: Latin pop
- Instrument: Vocals
- Years active: 2009–present
- Label: Columbia
- Member of: Big Time Rush

Carlos Roberto PenaVega (né Pena Jr.; Spanish: Peña; born August 15, 1989) is an American actor and singer. He starred on the Nickelodeon series Big Time Rush as Carlos García, and is a member of the namesake group Big Time Rush. He was also the host of the network's game show Webheads. He currently voices Bobby Santiago in The Loud House franchise.

== Early life ==
PenaVega was born on August 15, 1989, in Columbia, Missouri. His father is of Spanish and Venezuelan descent, and his mother is Dominican. He was raised in Weston, Florida. He attended Sagemont Upper School where he was a cheerleader. He appeared in local productions of Grease and Man of La Mancha. He also had a role in a production of Titanic by the American Heritage School, which he attended before moving to Los Angeles to pursue an acting career. During his run in Titanic he fell in love with singing and dancing.

== Career ==
=== 2004–2013: Career beginning and Big Time Rush ===
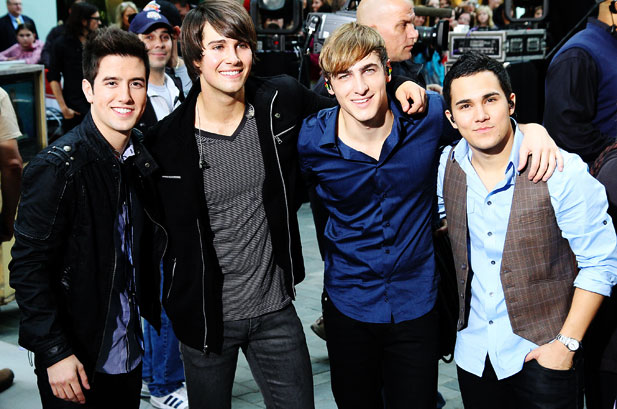
PenaVega with Big Time Rush in 2010.

His first acting role was a guest star at the age of 15 on ER, followed later that year by guest-starring roles on Judging Amy, Summerland, and Ned's Declassified School Survival Guide. While still in high school, PenaVega appeared in television commercials for the Super Soaker brand recreational water gun, and his image even appeared on the toy's packaging. PenaVega was studying musical theater at the Boston Conservatory when his manager urged him to audition for Big Time Rush. Although he was reluctant to do so, he submitted an audition tape and won the role almost two years later. PenaVega moved to Hollywood in August 2009, The show had four seasons and was one of the most popular shows on Nickelodeon.

Big Time Rush is an American pop boy band that formed in 2009. The band consists of PenaVega, Kendall Schmidt, James Maslow, and Logan Henderson, all on vocals. PenaVega co-wrote the song "Oh Yeah" off of the group's first album, BTR. On the second album, he wrote "Invisible" along with Charley Greenberg, Cody Williams, Daniel Andrew Wayne and J.R. Rotem. As of 2011, the band has released two albums, BTR and Elevate. They later released their third album, 24/Seven. He co-wrote "Picture This" with bandmate, James Maslow. PenaVega wrote "Lost in Love" for his wife, Alexa PenaVega. He also wrote the song "Na Na Na" on 24/Seven. In addition, BTR embarked on the Summer Break Tour, in support of the album.

=== 2014–2017: Solo career ===
He released his first solo single in Spanish on February 4, 2014, titled "Electrico". The song charted in the top 10 of the Latin iTunes songs charts. He was presented for the first time at the first annual Nickelodeon Colombia Kids' Choice Awards given in Bogotá. PenaVega competed on the 21st season of Dancing with the Stars in Fall 2015. His wife was also a contestant that season. His professional partner was Witney Carson. PenaVega and Carson reached the finals but were eliminated on the week's performance night and ended the competition in fourth place. In 2017 he released the single "Bésame" featuring MAFFiO.

=== 2017–present: Hallmark, BTR Reunion & Book, ANGELS + KINGS ===
In 2017 he starred alongside his wife in the Hallmark movie Enchanted Christmas and alongside Adelaide Kane in A Midnight Kiss. In 2018 he starred alongside his wife again in the Hallmark movie Love at Sea. He was a series regular in the one season CW series Life Sentence. In 2019 PenaVega and his wife starred in the Hallmark movie series Picture Perfect Mysteries.

In 2021 Big Time Rush announced they would be reuniting for shows in New York and Chicago. The band also made an appearance at several Jingle Ball concerts in December 2021. In 2022 they announced the Forever Tour that would take them around the U.S. and Mexico. His family has traveled on the tour with him.

Carlos and Alexa PenaVega released a book in 2022 called What If Love is the Point.

On October 4, 2024, Carlos announced via Instagram his new band (in addition to BTR) Angels + Kings with friend Alex Marshall. The bands first song "Lightning" came out on October 25, 2024.

== Personal life ==
In 2012, PenaVega began dating American actress Alexa Vega after meeting her at a Bible study. She made a guest appearance on the final episode of Big Time Rush, playing the on-screen new girlfriend of his character. The couple became engaged in August 2013, and were married on January 4, 2014, in Puerto Vallarta, Mexico, both taking PenaVega as their married name. They are both devout Christians.

The couple shares a YouTube channel, La Vida PenaVega (formerly LexLovesLos). The couple have three children, two sons born in 2016 and 2019, and a daughter born in 2021. The couple announced in November 2023 that they were expecting their fourth child; in April 2024, Alexa gave birth to a stillborn daughter. In 2023, the couple moved to Nashville, Tennessee after having lived in Maui since 2017.

=== Awards and nominations ===
PenaVega and his partners of Big Time Rush were honored in 2010 in the category "One to Watch" at the Young Hollywood Awards.

== Filmography ==
=== Film ===
Year	Title	Role	Notes
2011	Little Birds	Louis	
2012	Yak: The Giant King	Krudd	Voice role (English dub)
2014	Code Academy	Marcos	
2015	Spare Parts	Oscar Vasquez	
2017	Killing Hasselhoff	Pedro	
2018	Sleep Away	Joaquin	
2020	Mighty Oak	Pedro	
2021	The Loud House Movie	Bobby Santiago	Voice role
2024	The Casagrandes Movie	Bobby Santiago, Flat Arturo	Voice role

=== Television ===
Year	Title	Role	Notes
2004	ER	Arlo Escobar	Episode: "Shot in the Dark"
2004–2005	Ned's Declassified School Survival Guide	King Bee	Recurring role (season 1)
2005	Judging Amy	Diego Valdesera	Episode: "Diego Valdesera"
2005	Summerland	Student	Episode: "Sledgehammer"
2009–2013	Big Time Rush	Carlos Garcia	Main role (as Carlos Pena Jr.); director: "Big Time Tour Bus"
2011	Hand aufs Herz	Himself	Episode: "August 11, 2011"
2011	Nick News	Himself	Episode: "Lies We Tell In Middle School"
2012	Big Time Movie	Carlos Garcia	Television film
2012	How to Rock	Himself	Episode: "How to Rock an Election"
2012	Cupcake Wars	Guest judge	Episode: "Big Time Rush"
2012–2013	Figure It Out	Himself	Panelist
2013	Marvin Marvin	Himself	Episode: "Big Time Marvin"
2014–2015	Webheads	Himself	Host
2015	Dancing with the Stars	Himself	Contestant (season 21)
2015	The Thundermans	Tech Rider	Episode: "No Country for Old Mentors"
2015	The Penguins of Madagascar	Carlos the Beaver	Episode: "Tunnel of Love"
2015	Instant Mom	Roger	Episode: "Turning a Blind Eye"
2016	Grease: Live	Kenickie	Television special
2016–present	The Loud House	Bobby Santiago, Boys Will Be Boyz, additional voices	Recurring voice role
2017	Enchanted Christmas	Ricardo Archuleta	Television film (Hallmark)
2018	Love at Sea	Tony Rieves	Television film (Hallmark)
2018	A Midnight Kiss	David Campos	Television film (Hallmark)
2018	Life Sentence	Diego	Main role
2019	Picture Perfect Mysteries: Newlywed and Dead	Detective Sam Acosta	Television film (Hallmark Movies & Mysteries)
2019–2022	The Casagrandes	Bobby Santiago, Ronnie Anne Lookalike, additional voices	Main voice role
2020	Blue's Clues & You!	Himself	Episode "Happy Birthday, Blue!"
2020	Picture Perfect Mysteries: Dead Over Diamonds	Detective Sam Acosta	Television film (Hallmark Movies & Mysteries)
2020	Picture Perfect Mysteries: Exit, Stage Death	Detective Sam Acosta	Television film (Hallmark Movies & Mysteries)
2021	The Loud House Mega Music Countdown	Himself	Host
2022	Love in the Limelight	Nick Mendez	Television film (Hallmark)
2025	A Week Away: The Series	Jeremy	Angel Studios series
2026	Celebrity Weakest Link	Himself	Contestant (Winner; $50,000) (World Vision International)

== Discography ==
=== Singles ===
List of singles, with selected chart positions
Title	Year	Peak chart positions	Album
Title	Year	US Latin	Album
"Electrico"	2014	17	Non-album single
"Bésame" (featuring MAFFiO)	2017	—	Non-album single
"—" denotes releases that did not chart or were not released in that territory.

=== Other appearances ===
Title	Year	Other(s) artist(s)	Album
"Principio Y Fin"	2015	Evan Craft	Principio Y Fin
"Summer Nights"	2016	Grease: Live cast	Grease: Live
"We Go Together"	2016	Grease: Live cast	Grease: Live
"Greased Lightnin'"	2016	Aaron Tveit	Grease: Live
