= Big Time Rush (TV series) =

American television series

- Genre: Teen sitcom
- Created by: Scott Fellows
- Showrunner: Scott Fellows
- Starring: Kendall Schmidt; James Maslow; Carlos Pena Jr.; Logan Henderson; Ciara Bravo; Stephen Kramer Glickman; Tanya Chisholm
- Opening theme: "Big Time Rush" performed by Big Time Rush
- Composers: Dusty Moon; Guy Moon
- Country of origin: United States
- Original language: English
- No. of seasons: 4
- No. of episodes: 74 (list of episodes)

Production
- Executive producers: Marjorie Cohn; Lazar Saric; Scott Fellows
- Producers: Grace Gifford; Joanne Toll; Lazar Saric; Debra Spidell
- Production locations: Los Angeles, California; Hollywood, California; Rochester, Minnesota; Malibu, California
- Cinematography: Carlos Gonzalez; Mike Mickens; Brandon Mastrippolito
- Camera setup: Film; Single-camera
- Running time: 23 minutes (regular episodes); 57 minutes (special episodes)
- Production companies: Jack Mackie Pictures; Sony Music Entertainment; Nickelodeon Productions

Original release
- Network: Nickelodeon
- Release: November 28, 2009 – July 25, 2013

Big Time Rush is an American musical sitcom television series created by Scott Fellows that originally aired on Nickelodeon from November 28, 2009, to July 25, 2013, featuring the band Big Time Rush portrayed as a fictional version of themselves, similar to The Monkees.

It focuses on the Hollywood misadventures of four hockey players from Duluth, Minnesota—Kendall Knight, James Diamond, Carlos Garcia, and Logan Mitchell—after they are selected to form a boy band by fictional mega music producer Gustavo Rocque.

== History ==
The series premiered with an hour-long pilot episode, "Big Time Audition", on Nickelodeon, on November 28, 2009. Its official debut episode premiered on January 18, 2010. The show's second season premiered on September 25, 2010. On May 24, 2011, Big Time Rush was renewed for a third season with production scheduled to begin in January 2012. Season three premiered on May 12, 2012. Big Time Movie, a film adaptation of the series, premiered on March 10, 2012. On August 6, 2012, Nickelodeon renewed Big Time Rush for a 13-episode fourth season. Production began on January 7, 2013. The fourth season premiered on May 2, 2013, and aired its series finale "Big Time Dreams" on July 25, 2013.

== Cast and characters ==
=== Main ===
- Kendall Schmidt as Kendall Knight, the most rebellious of the group and the self-appointed leader
- James Maslow as James Diamond, the handsome one of the group
- Carlos Pena Jr. as Carlos Garcia, the crazy, wild, and fun-loving one of the group
- Logan Henderson as Hortense “Logan” Mitchell, the smart one and the voice of reason of the group
- Ciara Bravo as Katie Knight, Kendall's younger sister
- Stephen Kramer Glickman as Gustavo Rocque, the boys' hot-tempered manager and record producer
- Tanya Chisholm (seasons 2–4; recurring season 1) as Kelly Wainwright, Gustavo's assistant

=== Recurring ===
- Katelyn Tarver as Jo Taylor, an actress, a singer, and Kendall's girlfriend from North Carolina
- Challen Cates as Jennifer Knight, Kendall and Katie's mother, who takes care of all four boys while they are in L.A.
- Erin Sanders as Camille Roberts, a dramatic method actress, Jo and Lucy's best friend, and Logan's girlfriend from Connecticut
- Malese Jow (seasons 2–4) as Lucy Stone, a red-haired punk rocker and James's love interest
- Matt Riedy as Arthur Griffin, Gustavo's boss who is the CEO of RCM-CBT GlobalNet Sanyoid
- David Anthony Higgins as Reginald Bitters, the manager of the Palm Woods and Katie's nemesis
- Denyse Tontz as Jennifer 1
- Spencer Locke (season 1) and Kelli Goss (seasons 1–4) as Jennifer 2
- Savannah Jayde as Jennifer 3
- Tucker Albrizzi (seasons 1–2) as Tyler Duncan, a star of a juice box, diaper and underwear commercials, and neighbor from Palm Woods
- Barnett O'Hara as Guitar Dude, a guitarist who was originally a cello player
- Daran Norris as Buddha Bob, the Palm Woods' maintenance worker
- David Cade as Jett Stetson, Kendall's nemesis
- Tara Strong as Miss Collins, the teacher of the Palm Woods' one-room school campus
- Lorenzo Lamas as Dr. Hollywood, a local doctor
- Phil LaMarr as Hawk, Gustavo's nemesis and founder of rival business Hawk Records

== Episodes ==
Season	Episodes	Originally released	
Season	Episodes	First released	Last released
1	20	November 28, 2009	August 20, 2010
2	29	September 25, 2010	January 28, 2012
Film		March 10, 2012	
3	12	May 12, 2012	November 10, 2012
4	13	May 2, 2013	July 25, 2013

== Film adaptation ==
In late 2011, Nickelodeon announced that a television film based on the television series was going to premiere. However, a promo did not air until February 2012. The movie premiered on Nickelodeon on March 10, 2012, at 8 p.m. ET/PT. Throughout the whole weekend, the movie drew 13.1 million viewers.

== Production ==
The series was conceived and created by Scott Fellows, formerly the creator, executive producer, and showrunner of Ned's Declassified School Survival Guide. Fellows says his inspiration for the show was the musical comedy show, The Monkees—a popular and culturally significant American television series from the 1960s about a group of four young male adults who form a rock band, and perform songs while having comedic adventures. Although the show had a concept as early as 2007, the series had no actual title as late as August 2009.

=== Casting ===
A nationwide casting effort began in 2007. More than 1,500 teens and young adults auditioned for the four roles. James Maslow and Logan Henderson were the easiest and first actors cast. Kendall Schmidt was the last actor cast, and the most difficult role to cast. The role of Kendall Knight was originally to go to Curt Hansen, who later played Dak Zevon on the show, but when he appeared a lot older than the others and sounded too much like James in the pickup pilot, the producers auditioned and cast Schmidt after a recommendation by Logan Henderson, who was also friends with the actor before casting. Filming of the series began in August 2009. Actor Carlos Pena Jr. previously worked with Scott Fellows on Ned's Declassified School Survival Guide. As he had just entered the Boston Conservatory to study musical theatre, Pena was reluctant to audition but sent in a tape at the encouragement of his manager. Executive producer Scott Fellows was inspired to write each character by the personality of the actor playing him.

=== Music ===
Nickelodeon partnered with Columbia/Epic Label Group to produce the show, which incorporates original music into the series. Big Time Rush is one of the three Nickelodeon shows (the others are iCarly and Victorious) on which the cable network is partnering with the music group to promote music as well as shows. The Los Angeles Times has been critical of the show's focus on music, noting:

There is a marketing angle, to be sure, the same crossing of the revenue streams that powers. "Big Time Rush," was developed with Sony Music specifically to move units.

The show incorporates wacky sound effects, some laugh-like noises, music, and editing cuts designed to make it more humorous to the intended demographic of viewers aged 10 to 18; this was also typical of creator Scott Fellows' previous work on Nickelodeon. However, the show does not have a laugh track.

== Locations ==
The series was filmed in Stage 27, Paramount Pictures in Hollywood, Los Angeles, California. The series premiere's one-hour special took place in the suburbs of Los Angeles and a small town in Minnesota.

== Reception ==
=== Audience reception ===
A one-hour special preview (which serves as the series pilot and first episode) debuted on Nickelodeon on November 28, 2009, drawing an audience of 3.6 million viewers. The series' official premiere on January 18, 2010 (which followed the premiere of the iCarly special "iSaved Your Life"), was watched by a total of 6.8 million total viewers, Nickelodeon's highest-rated live-action series debut.

=== Critical reception ===
The show received positive reviews from audiences and mixed reviews from critics. The Pittsburgh Post-Gazette stated the show was "Nick's attempt at building a Jonas Brothers-style pop band. It's Nick's answer to Disney Channel's 'JONAS,' albeit slightly less organic since 'Rush' doesn't feature siblings." The Hartford Courant stated the series a "not so good" show "with their thin pop and unfunny comedies". The Boston Globe stated the show as "one example in a growing list of kid shows selling showbiz fantasies to children. The genre is stronger than ever now and more fixated on the perks of the glamorous Hollywood lifestyle ... wish fulfillment at a time when tabloid dreams are ubiquitous." DVD Talk had the following review of the Big Time Rush: Season 1, Volume 1 DVD. "It would be hard to craft a description engineered to be less interesting to me, and yet, as I plowed through this collection from the series' beginnings, I frequently found myself amended and entertained. Say what you will about Nickelodeon's teen programming, but they've got the art of making a solid sitcom down to a science."

== Awards and nominations ==
Year	Award	Category	Recipient(s)	Result
2010	2010 Australian Kids' Choice Awards	Fave TV Star	Big Time Rush	Nominated
2010	Casting Society of America	Outstanding Achievement in Casting – Children's Series Programming	Tara-Anne Johnson; Carol Goldwasser; Sharon Chazin Lieblein; Howard Meltzer; Geralyn Flood	Nominated
2011	2011 Kids' Choice Awards	Favorite TV Show	Big Time Rush	Nominated
2011	2011 UK Kids' Choice Awards	Nick UK's Favourite Show	Big Time Rush	Nominated
2011	2011 Australian Kids' Choice Awards	Fave TV Star	Big Time Rush	Nominated
2011	Young Artist Awards	Best Performance in a TV Series – Guest Starring Young Actor 18–21	Thomas Kasp	Nominated
2011	Young Artist Awards	Best Performance in a TV Series – Recurring Young Actor Ten and Under	Tucker Albrizzi	Nominated
2011	Young Artist Awards	Best Performance in a TV Series – Recurring Young Actress 17–21	Erin Sanders	Won
2011	Youth Rocks Awards	Rockin' Ensemble Cast (TV/ Comedy)	Big Time Rush	Nominated
2011	Kids' Choice Awards Mexico	Favorite International Show	Big Time Rush	Won
2011	Kids' Choice Awards Argentina 2011	Favorite International TV Show	Big Time Rush	Nominated
2011	Meus Prêmios Nick Brazil	Favorite TV Show	Big Time Rush	Nominated
2012	Young Artist Awards	Best Performance in a TV Series – Supporting Young Actress	Ciara Bravo	Nominated
2012	Young Artist Awards	Best Performance in a TV Series – Guest Starring Young Actor Ten and Under	Tucker Albrizzi	Nominated
2012	Young Artist Awards	Best Performance in a TV Series – Recurring Young Actress 17–21	Erin Sanders	Won
2012	Kids' Choice Awards Mexico	Favorite International Show	Big Time Rush	Nominated
2012	Kids' Choice Awards Argentina	Favorite International TV Show	Big Time Rush	Nominated
2012	TV Grama Awards	International Pop Series	Big Time Rush	Nominated
2012	Hollywood Teen TV Awards	Favorite Television Actor	Kendall Schmidt	Nominated
2013	2013 Kids' Choice Awards	Favorite TV Actor	Carlos Pena	Nominated
2013	Kids Choice Awards México 2013	Favorite International TV Show	Big Time Rush	Nominated
2013	Kids Choice Awards Argentina	Favorite International Program	Big Time Rush	Won
2014	Kids Choice Awards Colombia	Favorite International TV Series	Big Time Rush	Won
2014	Shorty Awards	Best TV Show in Social Media	Big Time Rush	Nominated
2015	Shorty Awards	Best TV Show in Social Media	Big Time Rush	Nominated
2017	Kids Choice Awards Colombia	20 Years of Nick in Latin America	Big Time Rush	Nominated
2017	Kids Choice Awards Mexico	20 Years of Nick in Latin America	Big Time Rush	Won
2017	Meus Prêmios Nick Brazil	Nick Retro / 20 Years of Nick	Big Time Rush	Nominated
2017	Kids' Choice Awards Argentina	Favorite International Nick Show of The Past 20 years	Big Time Rush	Won

== Home media ==
Name	Region 1	Region 2	Contains
Big Time Rush: Season One, Volumes One/Volume Two	March 29, 2011	October 10, 2011(part 1)/ February 13, 2012(Part 2)	Volume One Episodes 1-12/Volume Two Episodes 13–20.
Big Time Rush: Season Two, Volume One	January 17, 2012	November 8, 2012	Volume One episodes 21–31, 34–36 episodes from season 2.
Big Time Movie/Rags: 2-In-One Movie Pack	August 28, 2012	TBA	Features Big Time Movie and Rags on a disc pack.
Big Time Rush: Season Two, Volume Two	January 25, 2013	June 6, 2013	Volume Two episodes 32–33, 37–49 episodes from season 2.
Big Time Rush: The Complete First Season	July 8, 2015	March 26, 2012	Contains all the episodes from season 1. Manufactured on demand (MOD) on DVD-R.

== Broadcast ==
The series aired worldwide on Nickelodeon.

=== Season 1 ===
It was shown as a preview in Australia and New Zealand on April 10, 2010, and premiered on May 15, 2010. It was previewed on April 16, 2010, and premiered on May 31, 2010, in Southeast Asia. In the United Kingdom and Ireland, it was previewed on May 27, 2010, and premiered on June 21, 2010. In Canada, it was previewed on August 6, 2010, and premiered on September 6, 2010.

=== Season 2 ===
It premiered in January 2011 in Australia and New Zealand and in February 2011 in the UK and Ireland. It was announced by Nickelodeon in October 2011 that Big Time Rush would go free-to-air on CITV in the UK.

=== Season 3 ===
The third season premiered in November 2012 in Australia and New Zealand and in December 2012 in the UK and Ireland and in May 2012 in the United States.

=== Season 4 ===
It premiered in August 2013 in Canada and late 2013 in the UK and Ireland.

== Legacy ==
On February 21, 2025, it was announced that Big Time Rush would embarking on a reunion concert tour entitled the "In Real Life Worldwide Tour"; which is set to featured performances of every song from the original television series. In addition, the concert tour is also set to feature appearances by original cast members Katelyn Tarver and Stephen Kramer Glickman throughout the duration of the tour.

In July 2025, James Maslow announced that a second Big Time Rush film is in development for Paramount+. He said the band already has a finished script that they are "excited about," and they are talking with the studio. However, he warned that "there's no promises or guarantees" that the film will be officially approved. The project has Nickelodeon's "blessing" and involves Paramount+ and its parent companies. Unlike the iCarly revival, which updated the original format, Maslow said this film will tell a "totally different story" that reflects how the band members have grown up (now in their mid-30s). It will be aimed at an older audience compared to the original Nickelodeon show.
