= Logan Henderson =

American actor (born 1989)

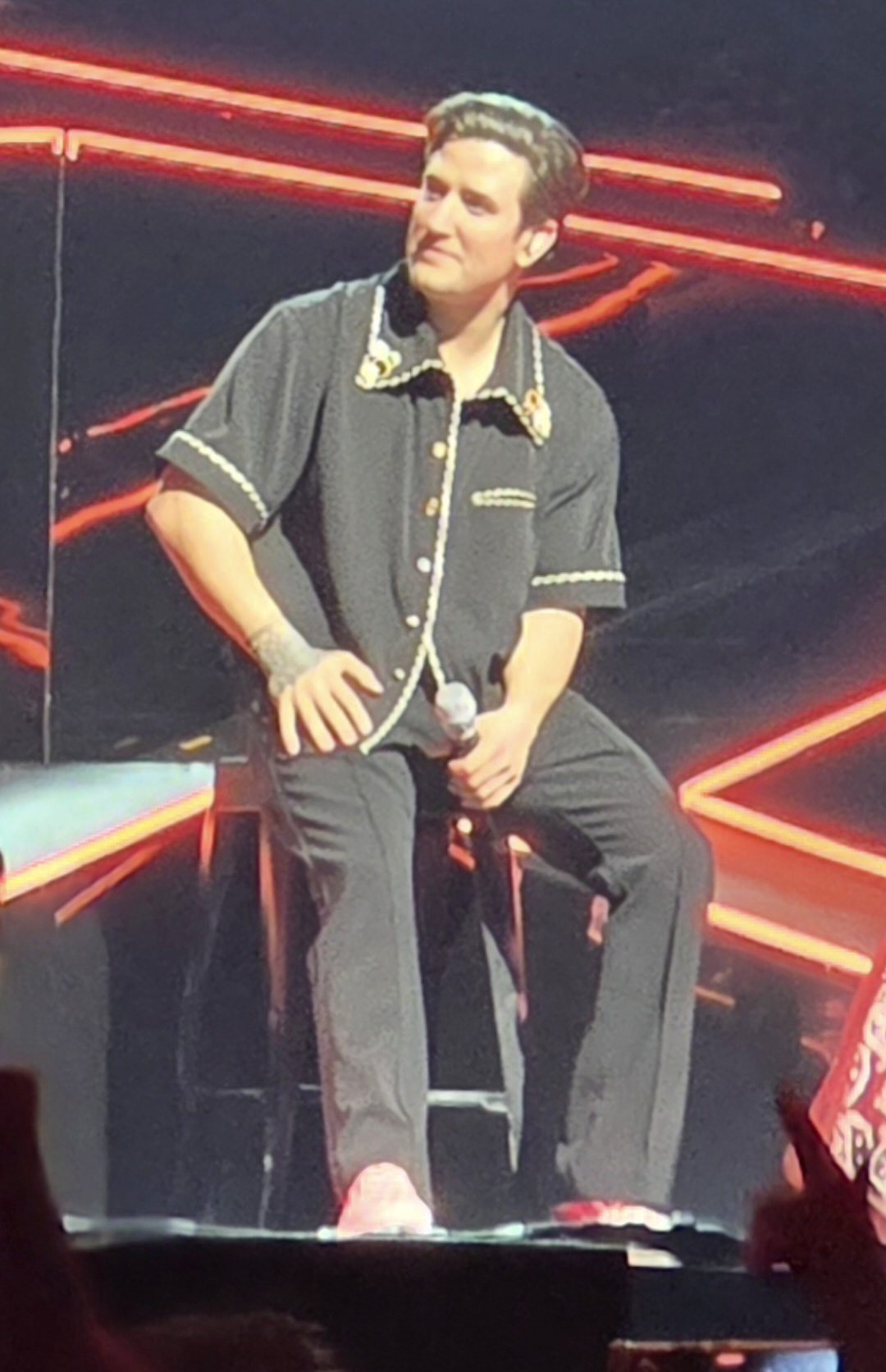
- Henderson in 2025
- Born: Logan Phillip Henderson; September 14, 1989 (age 37); Temple, Texas, U.S.
- Occupations: Actor; singer
- Musical career
- Genres: Pop; electro-pop; alt-pop
- Instruments: Vocals
- Years active: 2008–present
- Label: Herø
- Member of: Big Time Rush
- Website: loganhendersonmusic.com

Logan Phillip Henderson (born September 14, 1989) is an American actor and singer. He played the role of Logan Mitchell on the Nickelodeon series Big Time Rush (2009–2013) and is a current member of the band with the same name.

== Early life and career ==
Henderson was born in Temple, Texas and raised in North Richland Hills, Texas. His father is a school therapist and his mother works in the pharmaceutical industry. Henderson had a small role on Friday Night Lights in 2008. During his senior year at Birdville High School, Henderson auditioned for Big Time Rush at an open casting call in Dallas. More than 1,500 people auditioned for the role and producer Scott Fellows spent several months deciding which four would be selected. In the meantime, Henderson, then 18 years old, moved to California to pursue a career in acting. He completed his final year of high school in California.

The audition process for Big Time Rush lasted two years, which Henderson described as "intense". The applicants were not allowed to audition for any other projects during the waiting period. Henderson was ultimately offered the role in 2009.

=== 2009–2014; 2021–present: Big Time Rush ===
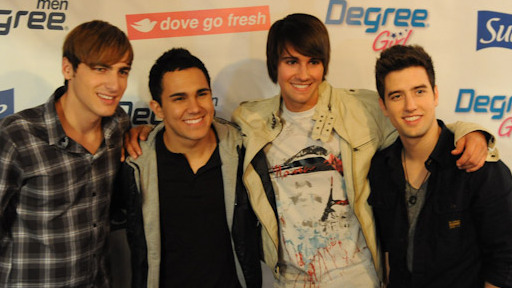
Henderson with Big Time Rush in 2010

Henderson's breakthrough role was on Big Time Rush as Logan Mitchell, a fictionalized version of himself. He was the "only member of the group without a major credit on his résumé". Henderson signed with Sony Music Entertainment and Columbia Records as a part of the Big Time Rush band in 2009, alongside castmates Kendall Schmidt, Carlos PenaVega, and James Maslow. The band released their debut album, BTR, on October 11, 2010. On the album, Henderson co-wrote on the song "Oh Yeah". BTR sold 67,000 copies in its first week and peaked at No. 3 on the Billboard 200. It also peaked at No. 1 on the Top Soundtracks chart on iTunes and was later certified Gold by the Recording Industry Association of America (RIAA).

Henderson and the rest of Big Time Rush made an appearance at the 2010 and 2013 Kids' Choice Awards and performed at the 2011 Kids' Choice Awards. They released their second album Elevate on November 21, 2011. Henderson co-wrote "Time of Our Life" with Nicholas "Ras" Furlong. Henderson co-wrote three other songs on Elevate: "Music Sounds Better With U", "Love Me Love Me" and "Superstar". In September 2012, Henderson signed with the ICM Partners record label. Big Time Rush's third album, 24/Seven was released on June 11, 2013. Henderson co-wrote many of the songs on the album with his fellow bandmates, including "Get Up", which he co-wrote with Schmidt.

=== 2017–2021: Solo career ===
After the band's hiatus, Henderson took a break from singing and acting for several years to focus on his personal life. Henderson returned to music with the release of his debut solo single and music video, "Sleepwalker", on January 27, 2017. The track introduced a new sound for Henderson, which he described as a "dark grunge pop sound", a departure from the music of Big Time Rush. His second single, "Bite My Tongue", was released on September 15, 2017, and continued the musical style of his first solo release. A third single, "Speak of the Devil", was released for digital download on October 30, 2017. On February 15, 2018, Henderson released acoustic versions of his previous three singles as an EP titled "Acoustic Sessions".

On May 15, 2018, Henderson announced the title and release date of his debut album, Echoes of Departure and the Endless Street of Dreams - Pt. 1, on social media. The album was released four days later on May 18, 2018 and was produced by Nicholas "Ras" Furlong. The album included his previously released singles as well as new songs "Take It out on Me", "Evergreen", and "Generations". The album is a two-part project, with Echoes of Departure and the Endless Street of Dreams - Pt. 2 forthcoming. Henderson released a single from the album's second part, "Pull Me Deep", on August 14, 2018. It peaked at number 40 on the Billboard Mainstream Top 40.

== Artistry ==
Henderson grew up listening to Aretha Franklin, Billie Holiday, B.B. King, Elvis Costello, and Prince. Some of the artists who inspired him and influenced his work are James Brown, Ben Folds, Kanye West, Death Cab for Cutie, Prodigy, Coldplay, The Killers, Radiohead, and Elton John. Henderson's debut solo project, Echoes of Departure and the Endless Street of Dreams, is focused around confronting tough personal battles in order to get closure and the payoff in getting comfortable with vulnerability.

== Discography ==
=== Studio albums ===
Title	Album details
Echoes of Departure and the Endless Street of Dreams - Pt. 1	Released: May 18, 2018; Formats: LP, Digital download; Label: Herø

=== Singles ===
List of singles, with selected chart positions
Title	Year	Peak chart positions	Album
Title	Year	US Pop	Album
"Sleepwalker"	2017	—	Echoes of Departure and the Endless; Street of Dreams – Pt. 1
"Bite My Tongue"	2017	—	Echoes of Departure and the Endless; Street of Dreams – Pt. 1
"Speak of the Devil"	2017	—	Echoes of Departure and the Endless; Street of Dreams – Pt. 1
"Pull Me Deep"	2018	40	Non-album singles
"End of the World"	2018	—	Non-album singles
"Disappear"	2019	—	Non-album singles
"—" denotes a recording that did not chart or was not released in that territory.

=== Other appearances ===
Title	Year	Other artist(s)	Album
"Passing Time"	2015	Heffron Drive	Happy Mistakes (Unplugged)

== Tours ==
- Spring Tour (2018)
- Forever Tour (2022)
- Can't Get Enough Tour (2023)

== Filmography ==
Year	Title	Role	Notes
2009	Friday Night Lights	Teenage Boy #2	Episode: "Who Do You Think You Are?"
2009–2013	Big Time Rush	Logan Mitchell	Main role, 75 episodes
2011	BrainSurge	Himself	Episode: "April 22, 2011"
2011	Nick News	Himself	Episode: "Lies We Tell In Middle School"
2011	Hand aufs Herz	Himself	Episode: "August 4, 2011"
2012	How to Rock	Himself	Episode: "How to Rock an Election"
2012	Big Time Movie	Logan Mitchell	Television movie
2013	Marvin Marvin	Himself	Episode: "Big Time Marvin"
2015	The Penguins of Madagascar	Beaver Logan (voice)	Episode: "Tunnel of Love"
