= Islands Disappear =

Studio album by Said the Whale
- Released: October 13, 2009
- Genre: Indie rock
- Length: 36:34
- Label: Hidden Pony Records
- Producer: Howard Redekopp

Said the Whale chronology
Howe Sounds/Taking Abalonia (2008)	Islands Disappear (2009)	Little Mountain (2012)

Islands Disappear is Said the Whale's second full-length album. It was released on October 13, 2009. Music videos for some of the songs have been made and are available on YouTube. Like their first album many of the songs reference events or places in Vancouver, British Columbia.

== Reception ==
Professional ratings
Review scores
Source	Rating
Chart Attack	4.5/5 stars
Pop Matters	7/10 stars
Toronto Music Scene	4/5 stars

Chart wrote, in a positive review of the album, "We all know Said The Whale have what it takes to make a raucous pop album, but they've instead opted for substance over flare. That chosen direction has them drifting toward New Pornographers territory—crafting songs that start simply, change direction, then gradually mutate into singalong choruses."

== Track listing ==
All songs written by Bancroft and Worcester.

No.	Title	Length
1.	"Dear Elkhorn"	1:29
2.	"Out on the Shield"	4:21
3.	"B.C. Orienteering"	6:25
4.	"Camilo (The Magician)"	2:53
5.	"Emerald Lake, AB"	2:36
6.	"Islands Disappear"	2:19
7.	"Black Day in December"	2:53
8.	"Gentleman"	2:19
9.	"False Creek Change"	2:08
10.	"A Cold Night Close to the End"	3:02
11.	"The Gift of a Black Heart"	3:19
12.	"Goodnight Moon"	3:14
13.	"Holly, Ontario"	3:11
Total length:		36:34

== Personnel ==
- Ben Worcester - guitar, vocals
- Tyler Bancroft - guitar, vocals
- Peter Carruthers - bass, vocals
- Spencer Schoening - drums
- Jaycelyn Brown - keyboards

=== Production ===
- Howard Redekopp - producer, recording, mixer
