= Said the Whale =

Canadian indie rock band

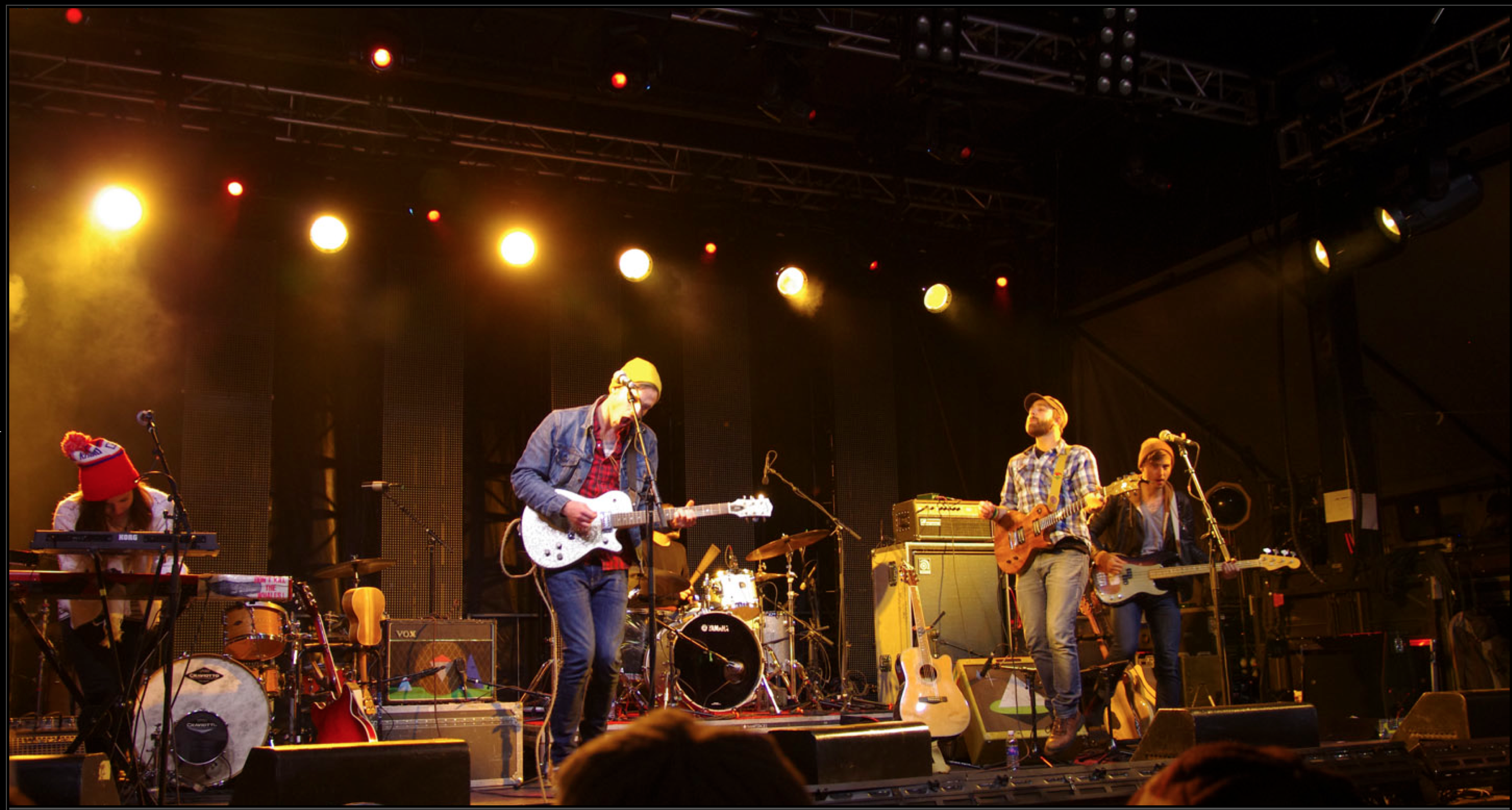
- Said the Whale, 2012 Grey Cup Street Party

Background information
- Origin: Vancouver, British Columbia, Canada
- Genres: Indie rock, indie folk
- Years active: 2007–present
- Label: EVERYTHING FOREVER
- Members: Ben Worcester; Tyler Bancroft; Jaycelyn Brown; Spencer Schoening; Lincoln Hotchen
- Past members: Laura Smith; Jeff LaForge; Peter Carruthers; Nathan Shaw; Bradley Connor
- Website: www.saidthewhale.com

Said the Whale is a Canadian indie rock band from Vancouver, British Columbia. The band was founded in 2007 by the group's primary songwriters, guitarists and lead vocalists, Ben Worcester and Tyler Bancroft. Their current lineup consists of Worcester, Bancroft, keyboardist and vocalist Jaycelyn Brown, bassist Lincoln Hotchen, and drummer Spencer Schoening.

To date, they have released seven studio albums, Howe Sounds/Taking Abalonia (2008), Islands Disappear (2009), Little Mountain (2012), hawaiii (2013), As Long As Your Eyes Are Wide (2017), Cascadia (2019) and their most recent, Dandelion (2021).

At the 2011 Juno Awards, Said the Whale were awarded New Group of the Year.

== History ==
Their debut EP Taking Abalonia was released in 2007. It was re-released with seven new songs on June 3, 2008, in Canada as a full-length LP under the name Howe Sounds/Taking Abalonia.

On July 1, 2009, Said the Whale released the EP The Magician to drum up anticipation for the release of their second full-length album Islands Disappear on October 13, 2009.

On November 18, 2010, the band placed second behind Canadian rapper Kyprios in CKPK-FM's 2010 Peak Performance Project, winning $75,000.

Scene from Winning America

In the spring of 2011, Said the Whale toured the U.S. for the first time. During this time they were the subject of the CBC documentary Winning America directed by Brent Hodge and Thomas Buchan. The movie documented the band's trip and performances along the West Coast of North America on their way to and from Austin, Texas's SXSW Music Festival and culminated when Said the Whale won the Juno Award for New Group of the Year at the 2011 Juno Awards. The documentary aired on July 23, 2011, in British Columbia, and on April 7, 2012, across Canada.

They released their EP New Brighton on November 8, 2011, in preparation for their third full-length album, Little Mountain, released internationally on March 6, 2012.

In early 2012, the band was awarded a spot on the Canadian music magazine Rockstar Weekly's list of the "Top 12 RockStars to Watch in 2012". The list also included Van Halen, The Rolling Stones, and Rush. The band performed at the Sasquatch! Music Festival in 2012 and 2013.

Said the Whale released their fourth studio album, titled hawaiii, on September 17, 2013.

On March 9, 2016, the band announced longtime bassist, Nathan Shaw had left the group to focus on his own electronic music songwriting and production under the moniker "Ekali", following Canadian rapper Drake sampling one of Shaw's songs a year prior on his 2015 mixtape, If You're Reading This It's Too Late.

On January 4, 2017, they announced their fifth album, As Long As Your Eyes Are Wide. Alongside its release, they also announced that founding drummer, Spencer Schoening would be leaving the band and that the group would continue as a trio. The album was released March 31, 2017, preceded by the lead single, "Step Into The Darkness" released January 4, 2017.

On March 5, 2017, they posted an Instagram video with an email address which fans could contact in order to listen to the whole album for free before its release. Fans could stream the whole album on a personalized, private SoundCloud account from March 10–15 without leaking or sharing the link. From the March 15–26, the fans could invite their friends to listen to the album in a "listening party" in order to promote it but still not sharing the link to the album, keeping it strictly limited to those who were sent the link.

Said the Whale finished a Canada-wide tour from in the spring 2017.

In September 2018, Said the Whale signed to Canadian indie label Arts & Crafts, and announced a new record to be released in early 2019. The band released a new single "UnAmerican" on October 12, 2018. They released their sixth studio album, Cascadia, on February 8, 2019.

Throughout 2021, Said the Whale released a number of singles and music videos from their upcoming album, including "Honey Lungs," "Everything She Touches is Gold to Me," "Show Me Everything," and "99 to the Moon." In May, Bancroft announced he was launching a new record label called EVERYTHING FOREVER. Said the Whale's seventh studio album, Dandelion, was released on October 22, 2021, via that label.

== Awards ==
- 2010: Peak Performance Project 2nd Place – $75,000

Juno Awards:

- 2011: Juno Award for New Group of the Year – Said the Whale

== Members ==
=== Current ===
- Ben Worcester – guitar, vocals (2007–present)
- Tyler Bancroft – guitar, vocals (2007–present)
- Jaycelyn Brown – keyboards (2008–present)
- Lincoln Hotchen – bass (2018–present)
- Spencer Schoening -drums (2007–2017, 2022–present)

=== Former ===
- Laura Smith – keyboards (2007)
- Jeff LaForge – bass (2007–2008)
- Peter Carruthers – bass (2009–2011)
- Nathan Shaw – bass (2011–2016)
- Bradley Connor – drums (2017–2022)

=== Touring ===
- Colin Dodds – keyboards (2008)
- David Vertesi – bass (2016)

== Discography ==
=== Studio albums ===
- Howe Sounds/Taking Abalonia (June 3, 2008)
- Islands Disappear (October 13, 2009) No. 73 CAN
- Little Mountain (March 6, 2012) No. 17 CAN
- hawaiii (September 17, 2013) No. 18 CAN
- As Long As Your Eyes Are Wide (March 31, 2017) No. 55 CAN
- Cascadia (February 8, 2019) No. 47 CAN
- Dandelion (October 22, 2021)
- B-Sides and Rarities (November 25, 2022)

=== Extended plays ===
- Let's Have Sound (March, 2007)
- Taking Abalonia (May, 2007)
- West Coast Christmas (December, 2007)
- West Coast Christmas 2008 (December, 2008)
- The Magician (July, 2009)
- West Coast Christmas 2009 (December, 2009)
- Bear Bones (February, 2010)
- Xmas EP (December, 2010)
- New Brighton (November, 2011)
- I Love You (June 6, 2013)

=== Singles ===
Year	Song	Chart peak					Album
Year	Song	CAN	CAN Alt	CAN Rock	US Sales	US Alt.	Album
2009	"Camilo (The Magician)"	—	20	48	—	—	Islands Disappear
2011	"Heavy Ceiling"	—	12	37	—	—	Little Mountain
2012	"Loveless"	—	28	34	—	—	Little Mountain
2013	"I Love You"	97	1	14	19	38	Hawaiii
2013	"Mother"	—	14	23	—	—	Hawaiii
2017	"Step Into the Darkness"	—	32	—	—	—	As Long As Your Eyes Are Wide
2017	"I Will Follow You"	—	16	30	—	—	As Long As Your Eyes Are Wide
2017	"Nothing Makes Me Happy"	—	50	—	—	—	As Long As Your Eyes Are Wide
2018	"UnAmerican"	—	—	9	—	—	Cascadia
2019	"Record Shop"	—	—	28	—	—	Cascadia
2021	"Honey Lungs"	—	—	21	—	—	Dandelion
2021	"Everything She Touches Is Gold to Me"	—	—	—	—	—	Dandelion
2021	"Show Me Everything"	—	—	—	—	—	Dandelion
2021	"99 to the Moon"	—	—	—	—	—	Dandelion
"—" denotes a release that did not chart.
