= Chris Kelly (podcaster) =

Canadian podcaster (born 1982)

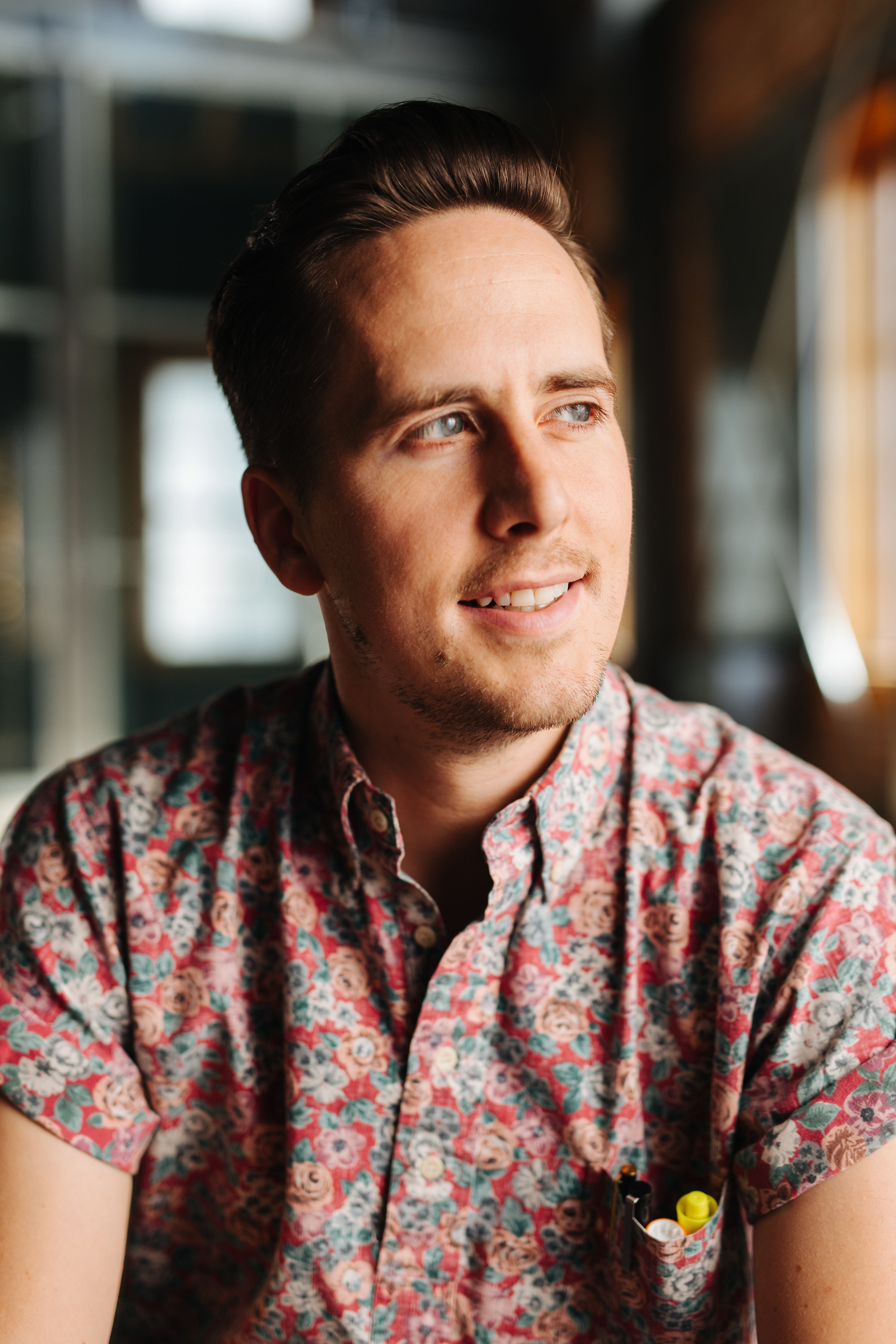
- Kelly in 2018
- Born: November 29, 1982 (age 43)
- Occupations: Podcaster, Musician
- Website: kellykelly.ca

Chris Kelly (born November 29, 1982) is a Canadian podcast producer and film composer/musician based in Vancouver, British Columbia. He is also co-founder of the production company Kelly&Kelly.

== Career ==
Kelly started his podcasting career at CBC, where he produced the corporation's first podcast, the CBC Radio 3 Podcast with Grant Lawrence. He then went on to co-create, with Pat Kelly and Peter Oldring, CBC Radio One's This Is That, a satirical current affairs show that has won multiple Canadian Comedy Awards. Also while at the CBC he worked for Spark, As It Happens, and DNTO.

After CBC, he co-founded branded podcast company Pacific Content. In 2016, he left Pacific Content to start Kelly&Kelly with Pat Kelly. With that company they have created such podcasts as This Sounds Serious, Dexter Guff Is Smarter Than You, Celeste & Her Best, and created a number of viral videos.

Kelly's musician career includes being a member of the bands Analog Bell Service, The Choir Practice, Colin Cowan & the Elastic Stars and Rob Butterfield, as well as playing at major music festivals, such as SXSW in Texas.

Kelly's film composition debut was the Brent Hodge directed documentary A Brony Tale, a film about the bronies, teenage and adult fans of the television show My Little Pony: Friendship is Magic.

== Personal life ==
Kelly is married to Lauren Bercovitch.

== Discography ==
- Chris Kelly - Company Man
- The Comet - The Comet is Coming
- Colin Cowan & the Elastic Stars - Fall Paths
- A Brony Tale: Music from the Motion Picture

== Podcast credits ==
Year	Podcast	Notes
2006–2010	The CBC Radio 3 Podcast with Grant Lawrence	Producer
2008	CBC's Spark	Producer
2010–2019	CBC This Is That	Creator & Senior Producer
2010	DNTO	Producer
2010–2011	Being Jann	Producer
2012	As It Happens	Producer
2015	The Slack Variety Pack	Creator & Producer
2017	Road Trip Radio	Creator & Producer
2017	Dexter Guff Is Smarter Than You	Creator & Director
2018–2020	This Sounds Serious	Creator & Director
2019	Celeste & Her Best	Producer
2019	The Zeta Family	Director & Editor
2019	Anna Faris Is Unqualified	Producer

== Film and video ==
Year	Film	Notes
2014	A Brony Tale	Composer
2014	CBC Beetle Roadtrip	Director & Sound
2015	Cameron's House Rules	Music by
2016	The Pistol Shrimps	Edited by
2016–2019	This Is That Video	Written & Directed by
2019	Human People	Directed by
2019	Aftershot (The New York Times)	Written & Directed by
