= Consider the Source (web series) =

- Written by: Carolyn Wells; Craig Spurlock; Ian Ballinger; Will Chilcoat
- Directed by: Brent Hodge
- Starring: Morgan Spurlock; Andrew Huculiak; Kirsten Huculiak
- Country of origin: United States; Canada
- Original language: English

Production
- Producers: Morgan Spurlock; Jeremy Chilnick; Brent Hodge; Rachel Ricketts; Eric Enright
- Cinematography: Brent Hodge; Josh Huculiak; Joseph Schweers
- Production company: Hodgee Films

Original release
- Release: September 21, 2015

Consider the Source is a 2015 Canadian-American web series directed by Brent Hodge and produced by Morgan Spurlock, produced through Spurlock's company Warrior Poets, Hodgee Films and Disney's Maker Studios. Consider the Source examines the everyday consumer products used by the public, such as gas or water, and the journeys that those products take to get from the factories and fields to store shelves and homes. The series was released on the YouTube channel SMARTish. After Maker Studios dissolved, the web series was removed from Disney's lineup.

== Origin ==
In 2014, Maker Studios was bought by The Walt Disney Company for $950 million. Spurlock's SMARTish channel was one of the first brands to be launched, with Consider the Source being the first show to be released on the channel. "'Smartish' shows will make you laugh and make you think, and I'm a real believer that if you can make someone laugh then you can make someone listen," Spurlock said in a statement. "Through this partnership with Maker, we are going to create the premiere destination for thought provoking and entertaining original content on the world wide interwebs."

== Production ==
The show visits cities across the United States and Canada visiting factories, businesses and organizations to analyze the source of an everyday product. Episode 1 of the show, titled "Say Cheese", was filmed in Tillamook, Oregon and Episode 2 of the show, titled "Florida Orange Juice", was filmed in Florida.

== Episodes ==
- Episode 1: "Say Cheese" - Filmed in Tillamook, Oregon, this episode delves deep into the creation process of cheese.
- Episode 2: "Florida Orange Juice" - An episode delving into the orange juice industry.
- Episode 3: "Denim"
- Episode 4: "Soap" - Filmed in San Francisco and Chicago at the development and production facilities of Method, we learn how soap is made.
- Episode 5: "Salt"
- Episode 6: "Bottled Water"

== See also ==
- Brent Hodge
- Morgan Spurlock
- The Walt Disney Company
- A Brony Tale
- Inside Man
- Maker Studios
