= Johnny Test (video game) =

2011 video game for the Nintendo DS

- North American cover art
- Developer: Sarbakan
- Publisher: 505 Games
- Platform: Nintendo DS
- Release: NA: March 29, 2011
- Genre: Platformer
- Mode: Single-player

Johnny Test is a video game that was released on March 29, 2011, in North America for the Nintendo DS console, based on the TV series of the same name.

== Plot ==
Johnny tampers with Susan and Mary's "Real Life Simulator" machine, inadvertently allowing Wacko access to the machine, who uses it to turn the town of Porkbelly into a medieval city. Brain Freezer also kidnaps and holds Gil, the twins' crush, hostage. Johnny and Dukey must use their sister's laboratory gadgets to fix the experiment, stop the villains, and save Porkbelly.

== Gameplay ==
The game is a 2D Platformer where players maneuver Johnny through twelve differently-themed levels. Depending on the level, Johnny switches to one of his alter-egos, such as Johnny X and Trooper J. Throughout the game, Johnny uses power-ups and several of his sister's inventions, including speed and projectile-based gadgets.

== Reception ==
The game received mixed feedback from critics, with Worth Playing providing a 7 out of 10 score, and The Other View giving it 3 out of 5 stars.
