= Molly Hawkey =

American actress

- Born: Molly Driscoll Hawkey; August 28, 1978 (age 48); Ossining, New York, U.S.
- Education: Cornell University (B.Sc.)
- Occupations: Actress; photographer; comedian; producer
- Years active: 2004–present
- Relatives: Renn Hawkey (brother)

Molly Driscoll Hawkey (born August 28, 1978) is an American actress, photographer, and comedian. She portrayed Lacey Wilcox in the horror comedy Brain Blockers (2007), Molly in the drama Higher Ground (2011), and voiced Orro Oxslayer in the fantasy video game Guild Wars 2 (2012). In 2016, she became known for editing herself into episodes of The Bachelor, which she made into a web series titled Molly on The Bachelor.

== Early life ==
Hawkey was born and raised in Ossining, New York. She is the youngest of five children born to Penelope "Penny" (née Sharp), an advertising executive who wrote the famous Coca-Cola commercial "Hey Kid, Catch!", and William Stevenson "Bill" Hawkey, who also worked in advertising. Her parents now own and operate Sundial Farm, a plant nursery in Ossining. She has four full brothers: Adam, a film compositor and colorist, Robin, a chiropractor, Renn, a musician and film producer, and Timothy, a marketing managing director. Hawkey also has two paternal half-siblings from her father's first marriage: William, a headmaster of The Pennington School, and Elisabeth, a corporate chef. She attended the Hackley School, from which she graduated in 1996, and went on to graduate from Cornell University with a degree in psychology.

== Career ==
=== Acting ===
Hawkey made her acting debut with a minor role in the 2004 short film Hard-bitten. She had a major supporting role as Lacey Wilcox in the horror comedy film Brain Blockers, which was released in March 2007. She next appeared in the small role of Molly in the religious drama film Higher Ground, which premiered at the 2011 Sundance Film Festival. The film was directed by her sister-in-law Vera Farmiga and produced by her older brother Renn Hawkey. She has since guest starred in multiple television series, such as Mad Men, Finding Carter, and Mom, and in the web series Ghost Ghirls.

She voiced Orro Oxslayer in the 2012 fantasy video game Guild Wars 2. In 2013, Hawkey created the web series Holy Singles in which she starred as Sevany Martin, an unlucky-in-love girl who hosts weekly Christian singles meet-ups in her backyard. The first episode was wholly improvised by Hawkey. In 2015, she began appearing in the comedy web series F'd, on which she also serves as producer, and for which she was nominated for Outstanding Lead Actress – Comedy at the Los Angeles Web Series Festival. Both series were distributed online by Funny or Die.

In 2016, Hawkey gained publicity when she began editing herself into episodes of the ABC dating reality game show The Bachelor. She told BuzzFeed, "While watching Chris Soules' season of The Bachelor I thought, 'Oh man! I need to cut myself into the next season!' There are so many elements about the show that crack me up, so I knew I would just need to heighten the tropes that amused me most." The series, titled Molly on The Bachelor, was acquired by Funny or Die.

She appears as herself in the documentary The Pistol Shrimps, which follows the women's recreational basketball team of the same name in which she is a founding member. The film premiered at the 2016 Tribeca Film Festival. Hawkey then had a cameo role as an interviewer in the comedy film The Tiger Hunter (2016). She next starred as Carla Wendos, a parody of keyboardist Wendy Carlos, in the Adult Swim parody infomercial Live at the Necropolis: The Lords of Synth. Hawkey then played the lead role of Shelly Warren in the short comedy-drama film Vape.

=== Photography ===
As a photographer, Hawkey has taken the headshots of actors such as Tim Meadows, Lauren Lapkus, Vera Farmiga, Taissa Farmiga, Keegan-Michael Key, and Jeff Perry. She served as still photographer for the film Higher Ground.

=== Podcast ===
In May 2018, Hawkey started Spermcast, a comedic podcast to help her find a sperm donor. Spermcast is broadcast by network Earios as one of its flagship shows.

== Personal life ==
Hawkey moved to Los Angeles in October 2002. Through her brother Renn's marriage, she is the sister-in-law actress Vera Farmiga. Hawkey is a member of the Los Angeles recreational basketball team the Pistol Shrimps, alongside actresses Aubrey Plaza, Maria Blasucci, and Angela Trimbur. She plays in the position of power forward. Hawkey is a member of the improvisational comedy troupes The Second City and iO West.

== Filmography ==
=== Film ===
Year	Title	Role	Notes
2004	Hard-bitten	Jogger's Friend	Short film
2006	Slideshow	Molly	Short film
2007	Brain Blockers	Lacey Wilcox	
2011	Higher Ground	Molly	
2012	Dominion Street	The Beaver	Short film
2014	Blood Shed	Nurse 2	Uncredited
2014	Get Up!	Woman	Short film
2016	The Pistol Shrimps	Herself	Documentary
2016	The Tiger Hunter	Interviewer 3	
2016	Vape	Shelly Warren	Short film
2019	You Can Do This	Annie	Short film

=== Television ===
Year	Title	Role	Notes
2012	Mad Men	Sarah	Episode: "Lady Lazarus"
2014	Mom	Woman	Episode: "Clumsy Monkeys and a Tilted Uterus"
2014	Finding Carter	Agent Dawson	Episode: "Pilot"
2016	Live at the Necropolis: The Lords of Synth	Carla Wendos	Adult Swim special
2017	Longmire	Jackie Purcell	Episode: "Fever"
2019	SMILF	Martina	Episode: "Should Mothers Incur Loss Financially?"
2019	The Conners	Customer	Episode: "The Preemie Monologues"

== Other credits ==
=== Video games ===
Year	Title	Role
2012	Guild Wars 2	Orro Oxslayer

=== Web ===
Year	Title	Role	Notes
2011	Consequences	Lisa	2 episodes
2013	Ghost Ghirls	Janice	Episode: "I Believe in Mira-ghouls"
2013	Holy Singles	Sevany Martin	6 episodes; also creator and producer
2014	Red Shirts	Angry Bar Patron	Episode: "Space Criminal Part 1"
2015–2016	F'd	Molly	14 episodes; also producer
2016	Molly on The Bachelor	Herself	18 episodes; also creator and producer
2016	Wait Crimes	Calm Church Woman	Episode: "Tips for Salvation"

=== Podcasts ===
- Spermcast (2018–present)
