= Cameron's House Rules =

- Written by: Brent Hodge
- Directed by: Brent Hodge
- Starring: Cameron Mathison
- Music by: Chris Kelly
- Countries of origin: United States; Canada
- Original language: English

Production
- Producers: Brent Hodge; Lauren Bercovitch; Chris Kelly; Kristina Matisic
- Cinematography: Josh Huculiak; Joseph Schweers; Brent Hodge
- Editors: Brent Hodge; John Diemer
- Running time: 27 minutes
- Production company: Hodgee Films

Original release
- Release: March 17, 2015

Cameron's House Rules is a 2015 Canadian-American reality/comedy mini-series and a spin-off to Game of Homes, airing on the W Network, directed by Brent Hodge, produced by Hodge, Lauren Bercovitch and Chris Kelly and starring Cameron Mathison.

== Premise ==
Before the premiere of his newest show Game of Homes premieres on the W Network, host Cameron Mathison challenges himself to convert his run down garage into an awesome family room in only five days. With nothing but his tool belt around his waist, his dog by his side, and his family cheering him on for support, Cameron pushes through his every to try and complete the challenge in only five days.

== Episodes ==
- Episode 1 - Demolition Man - On day one of the family room challenge, Cameron clears out his garage, takes a sledge hammer to the walls and changes the layout of the future family room in a single day.
- Episode 2 - Help to the Rescue - With Cameron a little behind schedule, he's forced to call in reinforcements. Unknown to him, there's much more help coming than he ever could have imagined.
- Episode 3 - School of Rock - It's sanding day in the Mathison home and Cameron is still behind schedule, not in the home renovation area, but in his personal life, as he races to see his son, Lucas, play in a concert with his band.
- Episode 4 - Family Ties - The reinforcements are called in as Cameron recruits the help of his kids and his wife in painting and choosing the furniture and flooring.
- Episode 5 - Judgment Day - The moments has arrived, as Cameron prepares to invite his family of judges in as he puts the finishing touches on the newly converted family room.

== Production ==
The show was created and produced by Hodgee Films, the team behind 2014s award-winning documentary feature A Brony Tale. Filming took place over a week in Los Angeles, California.
