= Dukey =

Dukey may refer to:

- Dukey, an anthropomorphic dog character in the American-Canadian animated television series Johnny Test
- Dukey banna, the main character in Indian film Gulaal (2009) played by Kay Kay Menon
- Dukey Flyswatter, stage name of American actor, screenwriter and musician Michael Sonye (born 1954)
- family nickname of Harold Lloyd Jr. (1931–1971), American actor and singer, son of Harold Lloyd
- James Dukey, a clarinet player with the San Francisco Ballet
- Also spelled dookie, a U.S. slang term for defecation or feces
