= Winning America =

- Directed by: Brent Hodge; Thomas Buchan
- Starring: Said The Whale
- Country of origin: Canada
- Original language: English

Production
- Producers: Jon Siddall; Brent Hodge; Sheila Peacock
- Running time: 44 minutes

Original release
- Network: CBC Television
- Release: July 23, 2011

Winning America is a documentary television film about the Canadian band Said the Whale. It follows the band on their first US tour down through California, and then to South by Southwest. It premiered on CBC Television on July 23, 2011. The film was directed by Brent Hodge and Thomas Buchan, and was produced by Brent Hodge, Jon Siddall and Sheila Peacock. It was nominated for a Leo Award in 2012.

== Synopsis ==
The film follows the members of the band Said the Whale as they're about to embark on their first tour in the United States. It starts by introducing the members of Said the Whale, showing that even though they get a lot of radio play and have successful tours in Canada, they don't actually make enough money to live off of their music earnings so they all have separate jobs. They play a send off show in Vancouver, and then hit the road down to California on their way to South by Southwest. The tour hits a bit of snag when their trailer gets broken into and much of their gear gets stolen (2 acoustic guitars, an entire cymbal set, 3 suitcases, 7 guitar pedals, and a microkorg). Eventually they do make it to South by Southwest, and the rest of the documentary documents some of their shows there, some nights on the town, as well as Spencer (the drummer) getting attacked with a mustard bottle, and the band getting lemon tattoos to commemorate the trip.

The documentary concludes with the band winning a Juno Award for new band of the year, highlighting the dichotomy between being successful in Canada, and being completely unknown in the U.S.

== Cast ==
- Ben Worcester
- Tyler Bancroft
- Nathan Shaw
- Spencer Schoening
- Jaycelyn Brown

== Reception ==
The film received positive reviews and was nominated for a Leo Award in 2012 for Best Short Documentary Program.
