= Ashleigh Ball =

Canadian voice actress (born 1983)

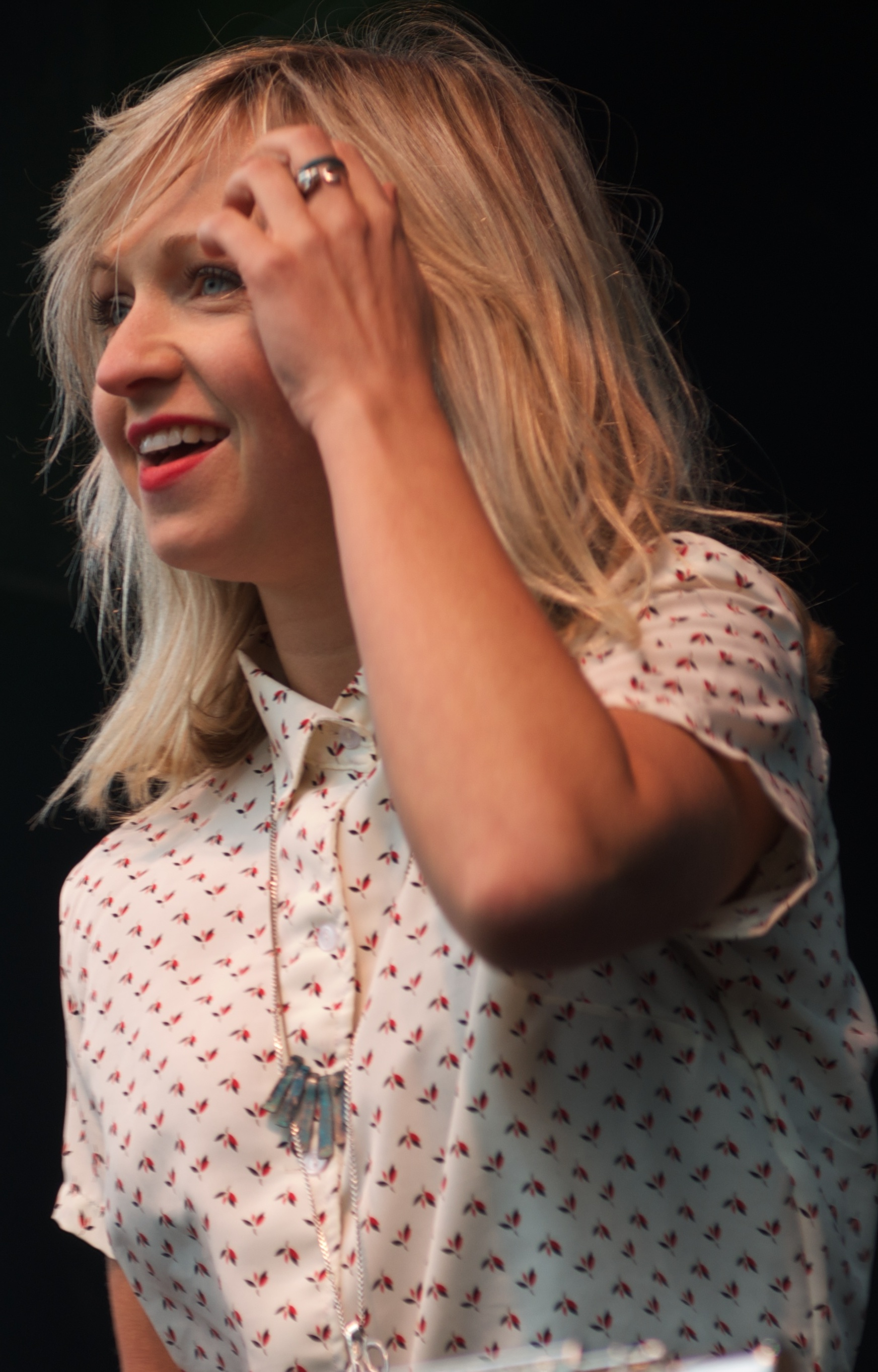
- Ball performing with Hey Ocean! in 2013
- Born: Ashleigh Adele Ball; March 31, 1983 (age 43); Vancouver, British Columbia, Canada
- Education: Canadian College of Performing Arts
- Occupations: Voice actress; musician
- Years active: 2005–present
- Children: 1
- Musical career
- Genres: Pop; rock
- Instruments: Vocals; flute; glockenspiel
- Years active: 2004–present
- Member of: Hey Ocean!
- Website: ashleighballmusic.com

Ashleigh Adele Ball (born March 31, 1983) is a Canadian voice actress and musician. She is known for voicing characters in several movies and television series, especially toyetic series, notably the Barbie film series, Bratz, Johnny Test, Care Bears: Adventures in Care-a-Lot, Littlest Pet Shop, Strawberry Shortcake's Berry Bitty Adventures, My Little Pony: Friendship Is Magic, LoliRock, The Deep, Sonic Prime and Ready Jet Go!. She is the subject of the documentary A Brony Tale directed by Brent Hodge, which follows her through her first interactions with the brony community at BronyCon 2012. She is also a member of the pop rock band Hey Ocean!.

== Early life ==
Ball was born in Vancouver, British Columbia, on March 31, 1983.

== Career ==
Ball has found a fan following through her band Hey Ocean! and through bronies, the adult fans of the television show My Little Pony: Friendship Is Magic, a show in which she voices and sings as two of the six main characters, Applejack and Rainbow Dash. Ball has been to several My Little Pony fan conventions, including BronyCon and Everfree Northwest as a guest of honor. Ball stated in her documentary A Brony Tale, in which she is the main subject, "It's (My Little Pony) a really important part of a lot of these people's lives. So yeah, as long as My Little Ponies exist, there will be bronies."

On May 2, 2017, she released the music video "Crazy" and on June 2, released her debut solo EP Gold in You.

== Personal life ==
In August 2025, Ball was diagnosed with Stage IV triple-negative breast cancer. She did not make this information public until October 2026.

== Filmography ==
=== Anime ===
List of English dubbing performances in anime
Year	Series	Role	Notes	Source
2005	Starship Operators	Sanri Wakana		
2006	Nana	Reira Serizawa		
2006	Shakugan no Shana	Yukari Hirai		
2007	Black Lagoon: The Second Barrage	Hansel, Maki		
2021	Hello Carbot	E-Line		

=== Animation ===
List of voice performances in animated television series
Year	Series	Role	Notes	Source
2005–2006	Coconut Fred's Fruit Salad Island!	B.L. Tomato		
2005–2006	Mix Master	Mary, Buma and others		
2005–2014	Johnny Test	Mary Test, Sissy, Lolo, Churro Boy, Pizza Delivery Guy, Wendell, Nerdy Kid, Jeffy the #1 Fan		
2007	Jibber Jabber	Jabber		
2007–2008	Care Bears: Adventures in Care-a-Lot	Oopsy Bear		
2007–2008	Edgar & Ellen	Stephanie Knightleigh, Pepper Poshi, Principal Mulberry, Miles Knightleigh, Townsperson Actor 2		
2008	Tom and Jerry Tales	Kangaroo Mother	Episode: "Kangadoofus"	
2008	Bratz	Kirstee, Prudence		
2008–2013	Skechers	Samantha	Some Hydee and the Hytops commercials	
2009	Iron Man: Armored Adventures	Black Widow / Natasha Romanoff		
2009–2020	Dinosaur Train	Gilbert Troodon, Lorraine Lambeosaurus, Oren Ornithomimus, Mrs. Therizinosaurus, Millie Maiasaura, Crystal Cryolophosaurus		
2010–2015	Strawberry Shortcake's Berry Bitty Adventures	Plum Pudding		
2010–2019	My Little Pony: Friendship Is Magic	Rainbow Dash, Applejack, Daisy, Cherry Berry, Shoeshine, Lemon Hearts, Cherry Fizzy, Lyra Heartstrings, Nurse Redheart, Apple Rose, Orange Swirl, Parcel Post, Dumbbell (Young), Rumble, Luckette, Berry Punch, Ol' Salt, Buffalo, Upper Crust, Nurse Snowheart, Applejack (Male), Applejack (Baby), Apple Rose (Young), Apple Dumpling, Prim Hemline, Twirly, Infirmed Pony, Amethyst Gleam, Neighls Bohr, Open Skies, Mob Pony 1, Gimme Moore, Sunshine Smiles, Hat-Shopping Pony, Manehattan Gardener Pony, Taunting Young Pegasi, Cheerilee's Students, Celestia's Students, Cyan Changeling, Cyan Forum Changeling, Snooty Fashion Scenester, Friendship School Student #6, Kirin #1, Young Buckball Fan, Pony Pointing Out Windigos	Also co-story for the episode "Sparkle's Seven"	
2011–2012	Voltron Force	Allura, Daigo, others		
2012	Hydee and the Hytops	Samantha	DVD movie	
2012	Action Dad	Mick Ramsey, Mastermind, Helga, reporter, Store Clerk, Old Lady, Bratty Kid, Costumer		
2012–2016	Littlest Pet Shop	Blythe Baxter, Alice, Sally Hairspray, Lemonface, Shea Butter, Hubble, Sheriff Blythe, Green Bean Fairy Queen, Baa Baa Lou, Claustrophobic Turtle, Farmer's Market Sheep, Witness Snail, Mitzi, Seal, Fluffy Lightning, Red Songbird		
2013–2015	Pac-Man and the Ghostly Adventures	Pinky, Spheria Suprema, Female Reporter		
2014–2017	LoliRock	Talia, Missy Robins, Belina, Lisa	2 seasons	
2015	Superbook	Samantha, Travis	Episode: "The Good Samaritan"	
2015	Lego Elves	Emily, Aira, Mrs. Jones, Skyra		
2015	Exchange Student Zero	Charity, Peg		
2015–2018	Dinotrux	Skya, Wrecka, Otto #2, Woodland Reptool #1, Numbers, Ankylodump, Dozeratops #1 (3), Ankylodump #2 (3), Ankylodump #2 (4), Dozeratops #2 (2)		
2015–2019	The Deep	Fontaine Nekton, Ted, Todd		
2016–2019	Ready Jet Go!	Jet, Zerk, Jet 2, Face 9000's Mother, Mitchell's Mom, Man in the Moon, Customer #2, Generic Kid #2, Random Kid (1), Big Boss, Scientist #2, Random Kid (2)		
2016	Mack & Moxy	Chuckle	Episode: "Buckle, Buckle, Seatbelts and Chuckle"	
2016–2018	Beat Bugs	Jay, Mrs. Mudwasp, Mee-Yow, Teacher, School Kid, Mudwasp Kids, Mynah Bird #2, Skolly, Svetlana, Queen Bee, Bugette	Also All Together Now	
2018–2020	The Hollow	Mira		
2019	Rev & Roll	Rev, Townsperson #2, Generic Kid		
2020–2021	My Little Pony: Pony Life	Rainbow Dash, Applejack, Owlowiscious		
2020	StarBeam	Murp	Episode: The Good Samaritan	
2022	Johnny Test (2021)	Jeffy the #1 Fan	Episode: "Johnny Con"	
2022–2024	Sonic Prime	Miles "Tails" Prower, Nine, Mangey Tails, Sails Tails, Bunny Bones		
2025	Super Team Canada	Ms. Madam, Doctor		

=== Films ===
List of voice performances in theatrical releases, direct-to-video, and television films and specials
Year	Title	Role	Notes	Source
2005	Madeline in Tahiti	Danielle, Nona		
2005	Action Man: X Missions the Movie	Operator Voice		
2005	My Scene Goes Hollywood	Kenzie		
2006	The Barbie Diaries	The DJ		
2006	Barbie in the 12 Dancing Princesses	Hadley, Isla		
2007	Bratz Fashion Pixiez	Sasha		
2007	Betsy Bubblegum's Journey Through Yummi-Land	Cara Caramel		
2008	Bratz Girlz Really Rock	Kirstee		
2008	Edison and Leo	Robot Children		
2009	Barbie Presents: Thumbelina	Violet		
2009	The Strawberry Shortcake Movie: Sky's the Limit	Plum Pudding, Berrykin #2		
2010	Strawberry Shortcake: The Berryfest Princess Movie	Plum Pudding, Berrykin #2		
2010	Bratz: Pampered Petz	Celia, Little Joanie		
2010	The Legend of Silk Boy	Silk Boy		
2011	Thor: Tales of Asgard	Amora, Additional Voices		
2012	Barbie in A Mermaid Tale 2	Kylie Morgan, reporter		
2012	Barbie: The Princess and the Popstar	Popstar Keira		
2013	My Little Pony: Equestria Girls	Applejack, Rainbow Dash	Limited theatrical release	
2014	Heavenly Sword	Kai	Limited theatrical release	
2014	Barbie and the Secret Door	Nori		
2014	My Little Pony: Equestria Girls – Rainbow Rocks	Applejack, Rainbow Dash, Lyra Heartstrings	Limited theatrical release	
2014	My Little Pony: Equestria Girls - Shake Your Tail	Applejack, Rainbow Dash	Short film	
2014	My Little Pony: Equestria Girls - A Case for the Bass	Applejack, Rainbow Dash	Short film	
2015	My Little Pony: Equestria Girls - All's Fair in Friendship Games	Lyra Heartstrings	Short film	
2015	My Little Pony: Equestria Girls – Friendship Games	Applejack, Rainbow Dash	Limited theatrical release in Europe	
2016	My Little Pony: Equestria Girls – Legend of Everfree	Applejack, Rainbow Dash, Lyra Heartstrings	Available on Netflix beginning October 1, 2016	
2017	My Little Pony: The Movie	Applejack, Rainbow Dash	Theatrical release	
2018	The Steam Engines of Oz	Victoria		
2018	My Little Pony: Best Gift Ever	Applejack, Rainbow Dash, Pigeon Lady		
2018	Henchmen	Pep Girl Twin Iliad, Terri Murphy		
2018	My Little Pony: Equestria Girls - Forgotten Friendship	Applejack, Rainbow Dash	TV movie	
2019	My Little Pony: Rainbow Roadtrip	Applejack, Rainbow Dash	TV movie	
2019	My Little Pony: Equestria Girls – Sunset's Backstage Pass	Applejack, Rainbow Dash, Lyra Heartstrings	TV movie	
2019	My Little Pony: Equestria Girls – Spring Breakdown	Applejack, Rainbow Dash, Lyra Heartstrings	TV movie	
2021	Rock Dog 2: Rock Around the Park	Darma	Theatrical release	
2021	My Little Pony: A New Generation	Applejack, Rainbow Dash	Netflix release	
2022	Rock Dog 3: Battle the Beat	Darma		

=== Video games ===
List of performances in video games
Year	Title	Role	Notes	Source
2012	My Little Pony: Friendship Is Magic	Applejack, Rainbow Dash		
2013	Lego City Undercover	Ellie Phillips		

=== Live-action ===
List of live-action acting performances in television and film
Year	Title	Role	Notes	Source
2014	A Brony Tale	Herself	Documentary	
2021	Extroverted	Cookie	Television series	

== Discography ==
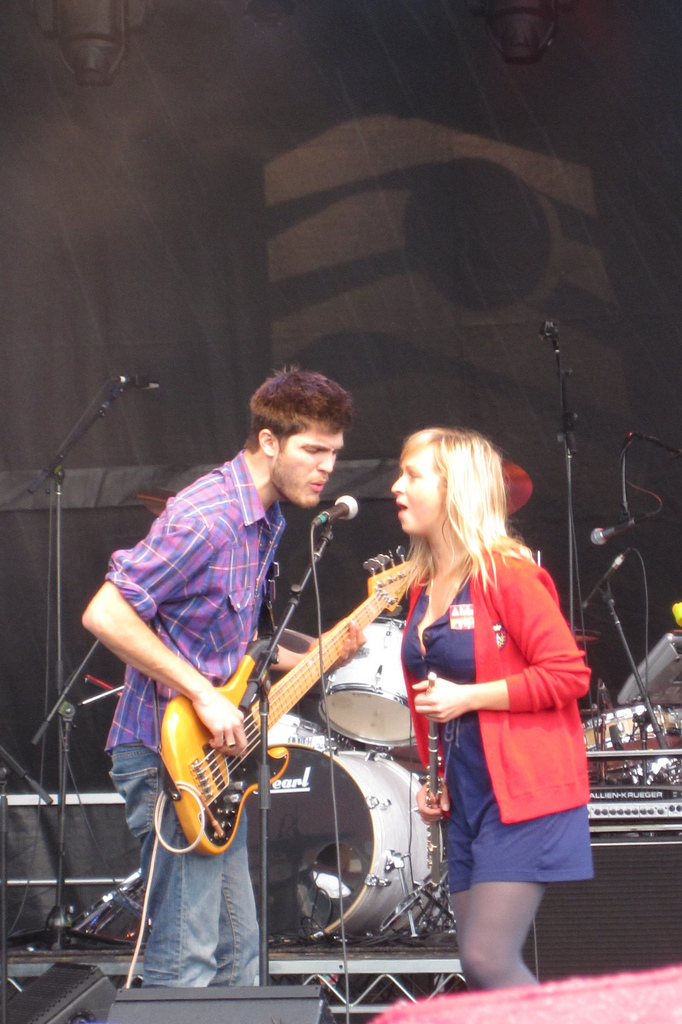
Ball (right) performing with Hey Ocean! in 2010

Solo albums

- Gold in You (EP) (2017)
- Before All the Magic's Gone (2021)
- Our Slowest Season (2025)
