= Heavy Ceiling =

Single by Said the Whale

from the album Little Mountain
- Released: February 19, 2012
- Genre: Indie rock, Hard rock
- Length: 3:08
- Label: Hidden Pony Records, EMI
- Songwriter(s): Ben Worcester, Tyler Bancroft
- Producer(s): Tom Dobrzanski

Said the Whale singles chronology
"Camilo (The Magician)" (2009)	"Heavy Ceiling" (2012)	"Loveless" (2012)

"Heavy Ceiling" is the first single from Little Mountain, the third studio album from Said the Whale. The single was released February 19, 2012.

The song arose from Tyler Bancroft being at a desolate summer camp in the middle of winter. With 24 inches of snow on top of the edifice in which Bancroft was staying, chunks of the frozen liquid would detach and collide into the ground. With few people around, the noises were rare and scary for the lead vocalist. The composition was meant to be an oratory between the roof and the ground, which would eventually collapse due to the girth of the elements.

== Music video ==
The music video for the song unites the dark forest with projected images to create a spooky effect.

The song begins with vocals and bass, the amount of which foreshadows the impact that is yet to come. The ensemble quickly backs that up with a super solid tune.

== Charts ==
Chart (2012)	Peak position
Canadian Alternative	12
Canadian Active Rock	36
