= Hey Ocean! =

Canadian pop-rock band

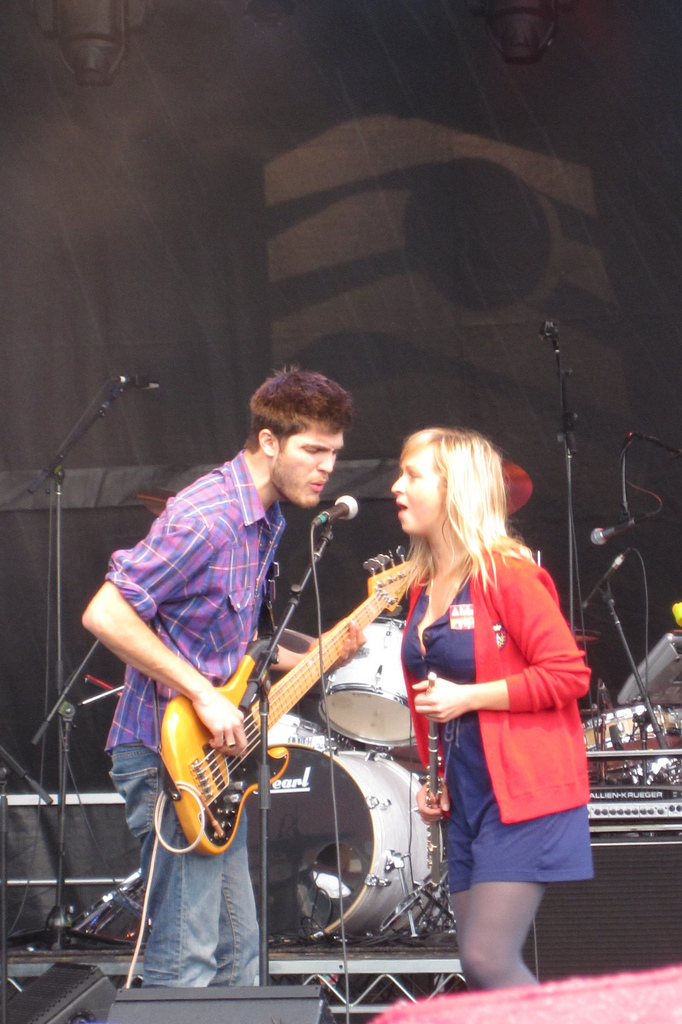
- David Vertesi with Ashleigh Ball in 2010

Background information
- Origin: Vancouver, British Columbia, Canada
- Genres: Indie pop; pop rock; synthpop; power pop; alternative rock
- Years active: 2004–present
- Labels: Universal; Nettwerk
- Members: Ashleigh Ball; David Beckingham; David Vertesi
- Website: heyocean.com

Hey Ocean! is a Canadian indie alternative rock and synthpop band formed in 2004 in Vancouver. As of 2026, they have released four studio albums and four EPs.

== History ==
David Beckingham (vocals/guitar) and Ashleigh Ball (vocals/flute) had been friends since sixth grade, joining with David Vertesi (vocals/bass) in 2004 to form the band. They ran their own label for many years, being represented by Nettwerk Management, and had overtures from Gene Simmons before signing with Universal Music Canada for distribution in 2011.

After releasing the EPs Triceratops (2004) and Rainy Day Songs (2005), Hey Ocean! issued their debut full-length album, Stop Looking Like Music, in 2006. They followed it two years later with It's Easier to Be Somebody Else. In 2009, the band toured Canada with the Cat Empire and performed at SxSW. A year later, they again toured Canada and played several events for the 2010 Winter Olympics in Vancouver.

In 2011, Hey Ocean! released the EP Big Blue Wave, and in the summer, they performed at the City of Vancouver's 125th Anniversary and at Live at Squamish, a three-day music festival in British Columbia. They finished the year with another cross-Canada tour, including an appearance at the Prince George Winter Festival. Ashleigh Ball suffered a vocal cord injury during a performance, which resulted in the cancellation of the Eastern Canada portion of the tour.

In 2012, Hey Ocean! returned with their third studio album, titled IS, and they followed it up in 2013 with the IS Acoustic Sessions EP.

Through 2015 and 2016, the group's performances were exclusively at charity events, such as Sing it Fwd, while Ball and others worked on solo projects.

In July 2017, the band announced through their Facebook page that they had reunited to work on a fourth album, titled The Hurt of Happiness. On September 19, they published two songs from the then-upcoming record: "Amsterdam" and "Can't Let Go". The Hurt of Happiness came out on April 6, 2018.

2017 also saw Ball launch a solo career, having released the EP Gold in You in June.

== My Little Pony fandom ==
Lead singer Ashleigh Ball's voice acting work has drawn international attention to the band from members of the My Little Pony: Friendship Is Magic fandom. Fans have created music videos featuring the band's songs and footage from the show, some of which were featured on the group's official website. At the end of June 2013, Hey Ocean! performed at Fiesta Equestria, a brony convention in Houston, Texas. They also made a collaborative music video between the staff of My Little Pony: Friendship Is Magic and bronies, titled #TweetIt. The band was featured in Brent Hodge's documentary A Brony Tale.

== Recognition ==
In April 2009, "A Song about California" was featured as a top song on MuchMoreMusic. Hey Ocean! was nominated that year for a Western Canadian Music Award and in 2010 for an Independent Music Award.

In 2011, "Make a New Dance Up" was featured in a promotional video from HootSuite, and the band performed for CBC's Canadian Indie Christmas Special. Hey Ocean! was also voted number one in the Best Local Band (Unsigned) category by readers of The Georgia Straight, a local news and entertainment paper, in its "Best of Vancouver 2011 Readers' Choices" recognition.

In 2012, "Islands" was featured in the episode "Last Known Surroundings" of One Tree Hill. The February 22, 2012, episode of Entertainment Tonight Canada ended with the music video for "Big Blue Wave". The song "Make a New Dance Up" was heard in the episode "Mother and Child Divided" of Switched at Birth.

Hey Ocean! was nominated in the Breakthrough Group of the Year category for the Juno Awards of 2013, (later won by Monster Truck), and featured on the compilation album released by Warner Music for the event.

== Band members ==
Current members

- Ashleigh Ball – lead vocals, flute, glockenspiel (2004–present)
- David Beckingham – lead guitar, backing vocals (2004–present)
- David Vertesi – bass guitar, backing vocals (2004–present)

Session / live musicians

- Devon Lougheed – guitar, keyboard, backing vocals
- Johnny Andrews – percussion

Past members

- Dan Klenner – percussion
- Adam Cormier – percussion
- Tim Proznick – percussion
- Andrew Rasmussen – keyboard, backing vocals

== Discography ==
=== Albums ===
- Stop Looking Like Music (2006)
- It's Easier to Be Somebody Else (2008)
- Is (2012) No. 70 CAN
- The Hurt of Happiness (2018)

=== EPs ===
- Triceratops (2004)
- Rainy Day Songs (2005)
- Big Blue Wave (2011)
- Is Acoustic Sessions (2013)

=== Singles ===
Year	Song	Chart peak		Album
Year	Song	CAN	CAN Alt	Album
2011	"Big Blue Wave"	—	40	Is
2011	"Tonight It's Christmas"	—	—	Non-album single
2012	"Islands"	—	—	Is
2012	"Big Blue Wave" (re-release)	88	—	Is
2013	"Make a New Dance Up"	—	—	Is
2017	"Sleepwalker"	—	—	The Hurt of Happiness
2017	"Amsterdam / Can't Let Go"	—	—	The Hurt of Happiness
2018	"The Hurt of Happiness"	—	—	The Hurt of Happiness
2020	"Happy Now / Honeydew"	—	—	TBA
"—" denotes a release that did not chart.

== Music videos ==
- "A Song About California" (2008) by JP Poliquin
- "Fish" (2008) by JP Poliquin
- "Too Soon" (2008)
- "Alleyways" (2008)
- "Fifteen Words" (2008)
- "Terribly Stable" (2009) by Godo Medina & Adam Dent
- "Big Blue Wave" (2012)
- "Islands" (2012)
- "I Am a Heart" (2012)
- "Change" (2013)
- "Make a New Dance Up" (2013)
- "If I Were a Ship" (2014)
- "Sleepwalker" (2018)
- "Amsterdam" (2018)
- "Mama Said" (2018)
