= As Long As Your Eyes Are Wide =

Studio album by Said the Whale
- Released: March 31, 2017
- Recorded: Vancouver
- Genre: Indie rock
- Length: 32:36
- Label: Hidden Pony Records
- Producer: Cayne McKenzie

Said the Whale chronology
hawaiii (2013)	As Long As Your Eyes Are Wide (2017)	Cascadia (2019)

As Long As Your Eyes Are Wide is the fifth studio album from Canadian indie-rock band Said the Whale. It was released on March 31, 2017. The album marks the band's first release as a trio following the departure of bassist Nathan Shaw. In late 2016, the band announced the pending release of the album, stating that it would be a return to form on how the band used to make music. The album received generally favorable reviews, with Atwood Magazine stating that the band had captured moments of "both raw, harrowing emotion and sheer delight". Despite featuring heavier subject matter than previous records, the band was praised for the album's overall hopeful message.

== Track listing ==
No.	Title	Length
1.	"Step into the Darkness"	2:56
2.	"More Than Ever"	3:21
3.	"Heaven"	2:58
4.	"I Will Follow You"	3:01
5.	"Realize Real Eyes"	3:27
6.	"Confidence"	2:52
7.	"Miscarriage"	3:32
8.	"Beautiful Morning"	3:04
9.	"Emily Rose"	3:37
10.	"Lilac and Willow"	3:37
Total length:		32:36
