= I Love You (EP) =

EP by Said the Whale
- Released: June 4, 2013
- Genre: Indie rock
- Label: Universal Music

Said the Whale chronology
Little Mountain (2012)	I Love You (2013)	hawaiii (2013)

I Love You is the tenth EP by Said the Whale. It was produced by Tom Dobrzanski and was released on June 4, 2013, by Hidden Pony Records. "I Love You", the first single from the EP, peaked at No. 3 on the Mediabase Alternative Rock chart.

== Critical reception ==
The album is described by The Owl Mag as being "centered on the joys and tribulations of family" while Now magazine portrays the album as "flirty but so G-rated that even the best lyrics are dulled by all the saccharine sweetness".

== Said the Ale beer ==
Concurrent with the release of the EP, Townsite Brewing in Powell River, British Columbia, released a beer named after the band called Said the Ale.

== Track listing ==
1. "I Love You" - 2:47
2. "Narrows" - 3:29
3. "Mother" - 3:12
4. "Barbara-Ann"

== Singles ==
Year	Single	Chart	Peak position
2013	"I Love You"	Canadian Alternative	3

=== Title track video ===
The lyric video for the title track "I Love You" portrays a doll with a hula skirt bouncing on the dashboard of a car driving on various types of roads.
