= Lauren Bercovitch =

Canadian producer

- Occupation: Producer/Film Maker
- Years active: 2012–present
- Notable work: A Brony Tale (2014)
- Website: grownupparty.com

Lauren Bercovitch is a Vancouver-based Canadian producer, whose film A Brony Tale was released in North American theaters July 2014.

== Career ==
After production managing at Adbusters Media Foundation for five years, Bercovitch story produced the Leo-award-winning Anna & Kristina’s Grocery Bag, which was also nominated for a Gemini Award. In 2014, Bercovitch produced the TV movie Anna & Kristina: Cooked and was a producer on Brent Hodge's A Brony Tale, a documentary about the bronies, the teenage and adult fans of the television show My Little Pony: Friendship is Magic. A Brony Tale had its world premiere at the 2014 Tribeca Film Festival and was met with critical acclaim.

Bercovitch is also head of production at Kelly&Kelly, a podcasting studio founded in 2016 and based in Vancouver in British Columbia, Canada.

== Filmography ==
Year	Film	Notes
2012	What Happens Next?	special thanks; Nominated for a Leo Award for Best Documentary in 2013
2012	Anna and Kristina's Grocery Bag	story producer; TV documentary
2014	Anna and Kristina: Cooked	story producer; TV movie
2014	A Brony Tale	producer; Premiere at 2014 Tribeca Film Festival, won Best Documentary at the Las Vegas Film Festival and holds a 100% "Fresh" rating on Rotten Tomatoes; nominated for four Leo Awards, including Best Feature Documentary
2015	Cameron's House Rules	executive producer; miniseries for the W Network
