= This Is That =

Canadian news satire radio program

- Genre: Comedy
- Running time: approx. 27 min.
- Country of origin: Canada
- Language: English
- Home station: CBC Radio One
- Hosted by: Pat Kelly; Peter Oldring
- Created by: Pat Kelly; Peter Oldring
- Produced by: Chris Kelly
- Recording studio: Vancouver, Canada
- Original release: July 2010 – December 2018
- Audio format: Monophonic
- Website: This Is That
- Podcast: CBC Podcasts

This Is That was a news satire program broadcast on CBC Radio, which aired comedic news stories presented in the style of a real CBC Radio public affairs program.

The program began as a summer replacement in 2010, returned in the summer of 2011, and was added to the regular schedule in the fall of 2011. It is hosted by Pat Kelly and Peter Oldring, and produced by Chris Kelly.

The This Is That team have also produced comedy videos for the CBC's web comedy platform CBC Comedy.

In September 2018, the This Is That team announced that its 13 new episodes in fall 2018 would be the show's final season. The show's series finale was a live and improvised special from the Broadway Theatre in Saskatoon, Saskatchewan on December 22, 2018.

In the 2019 Canadian federal election, Kelly and Oldring produced a number of short-format This Is That segments for the network's morning news series The Current.

== In the media ==
The program, whose style has been compared to The Onion, drew phone calls from listeners who did not realize that they were listening to a comedy program and took the content seriously; Oldring and Kelly admit to having been surprised that listeners would be fooled.

In June 2010, the National Post reported as fact that CTV purchased the set of the NBC series Friends; this, however, was a satirical story by This Is That. Two years later, Canadian journalist Robert Fulford wrote an article for the National Post claiming that the show is "worth tuning in for".

Also in 2012, Public Radio International reported as fact a This Is That story that dogs in Montreal would have to know commands in both English and French by law.

In early 2013, Harper's reported as fact a This Is That story in which a Canadian student "sued her university for failing to accommodate her allergies to cactuses, escalators, tall people, and mauve."

In September of the same year, several media organizations, including USA Today and the Washington Times, reported on a story about an U-11 organization that had decided to play soccer without a ball to remove competition from the game.

In 2014, Jonathan Jones at The Guardian wrote an article analyzing the satire in their story about a New York artist creating invisible art and selling it for millions.

== Awards ==
The program has won three Canadian Comedy Awards. Their comedy special "The Christmas Letter" won a gold medal in the category of Best Comedy Special at the 2014 New York Festivals International Radio Awards and their fourth season won a bronze medal in the category of Best Regularly Scheduled Comedy Program at the same awards ceremony.

At the 6th Canadian Screen Awards in 2018, Oldring won the award for Best Actor in a Web Program or Series for his performance in the show's CBC Comedy video series.
