= Hawaiii =

hawaiii

Studio album by Said the Whale
- Released: September 17, 2013
- Recorded: Monarch Studios, Vancouver
- Genre: Indie rock
- Length: 34:44
- Label: Hidden Pony Records
- Producer: Tom Dobrzanski, Tyler Bancroft

Said the Whale chronology
I Love You EP (2013)	hawaiii (2013)	As Long As Your Eyes Are Wide (2017)

hawaiii is the fourth studio album from Canadian indie-rock band Said the Whale. It was released on September 17, 2013. The first two singles, "I Love You" and "Mother", were both featured on the I Love You EP.

The song "The Weight of the Season" was previously released on their 2009 Christmas EP.

== Track listing ==
No.	Title	Length
1.	"More Than This"	1:24
2.	"Mother"	3:12
3.	"Narrows"	3:29
4.	"I Love You"	2:46
5.	"Safe to Say"	2:51
6.	"Resolutions (ft. Shad)"	2:49
7.	"Willow"	3:44
8.	"On the Ropes"	2:43
9.	"I Could Smoke"	2:27
10.	"Oh K, Okay"	2:54
11.	"Helpless Son"	3:13
12.	"The Weight of the Season"	3:10
Total length:		34:44
