= Cultureshock =

- Genre: Documentary
- Country of origin: United States
- Original language: English
- No. of seasons: 1
- No. of episodes: 5

Original release
- Network: A&E
- Release: June 25, 2018

Cultureshock is a documentary television series on A&E. Each episode focuses on a moment that shocks American culture. The episodes are directed by different people every week.

== Episodes ==
No. overall	No. in season	Title	Directed by	Original release date
1	1	"Michael Jackson's Final Curtain Call"	Thom Zimny	June 25, 2018
Death of Michael Jackson and the reaction from his fans and the people who worked with him.
2	2	"The Osbournes: the Prince of Reality"	Alison Ellwood	July 2, 2018
Reality show The Osbournes and its influence on later reality shows such as Keeping Up with the Kardashians.
3	3	"The Rise of Trash TV"	Joshua Levine	July 9, 2018
Tabloid talk shows such as The Jerry Springer Show and The Phil Donahue Show and how they influenced today's YouTubers.
4	4	"Freaks and Geeks: the Documentary"	Brent Hodge	July 16, 2018
The making of Freaks and Geeks and where the makers are today.
5	5	"Bring the Pain"	W. Kamau Bell	October 15, 2018
Chris Rock remembers how he prepared for the HBO special Chris Rock: Bring the Pain.
