= The Pistol Shrimps =

2016 documentary film

- Official poster
- Directed by: Brent Hodge
- Written by: Brent Hodge
- Produced by: Brent Hodge; Morgan Spurlock; Rachel Ricketts
- Starring: Aubrey Plaza; Molly Hawkey; Angela Trimbur; Amanda Lund; Maria Blasucci; Jesse Thomas
- Cinematography: Chris Velona; Jan Lim
- Production companies: Warrior Poets; Hodgee Films
- Distributed by: Seeso
- Release dates: April 14, 2016 (Tribeca); June 16, 2016 (United States)
- Running time: 75 minutes
- Countries: United States; Canada
- Language: English

The Pistol Shrimps is a 2016 Canadian-American documentary film about the all-female recreational basketball team of the same name, written and directed by Brent Hodge. The film stars Aubrey Plaza, Molly Hawkey, Angela Trimbur, Amanda Lund, Maria Blasucci, and Jesse Thomas. The film had its world premiere at the Tribeca Film Festival on April 14, 2016. The film was released on June 16, 2016 by Seeso.

== Synopsis ==
The film follows the Los Angeles-based all-female recreational basketball team the Pistol Shrimps (which includes members Aubrey Plaza, Molly Hawkey, and Angela Trimbur) during their 2015 season.

== Cast ==
- Aubrey Plaza
- Molly Hawkey
- Angela Trimbur
- Melissa Stetten
- Maria Blasucci
- Jesse Thomas
- Amanda Lund
- Steven Brydle

== Release ==
The Pistol Shrimps had its world premiere at the Tribeca Film Festival on April 14, 2016. The worldwide film rights were acquired by the comedy subscription streaming service Seeso on the day of the film's premiere. It also screened at the Seattle International Film Festival on June 1, 2016. The film was released on June 16, 2016.
