= Howe Sounds/Taking Abalonia =

Studio album by Said the Whale
- Released: (Canada) June 3, 2008
- Genre: Indie rock
- Length: 43:03
- Label: Upper Management Recording Co.

Said the Whale chronology
West Coast Christmas (2007)	Howe Sounds/Taking Abalonia (2008)	West Coast Christmas 2008 (2008)

Howe Sounds/Taking Abalonia is a re-release of Said the Whale's debut album Taking Abalonia along with seven new songs. The album was re-released on June 3, 2008, in Canada and soon after on iTunes.

Professional ratings
Review scores
Source	Rating
Chart Attack	3/5 stars

== Track listing ==
All songs written by Bancroft and Worcester.

No.	Title	Length
1.	"This City's a Mess"	3:00
2.	"Howe Sounds"	3:06
3.	"Curse of the Currents"	5:12
4.	"The Light Is You"	1:38
5.	"My Government Heart"	3:59
6.	"Last Tree Standing"	3:04
7.	"The Real of It"	1:40
8.	"This Winter I Retire"	3:58
9.	"Live Off Lamb"	2:20
10.	"The Banks of the English Bay"	1:59
11.	"Better for You"	1:55
12.	"Lady Hourglass, Your Head's On Fire!"	2:26
13.	"Fish and Stars II"	1:01
14.	"Plans for the Future"	3:52
15.	"Taking Abalonia"	3:53
Total length:		43:03

== Personnel ==
On Howe Sounds (Tracks 1–7):

- Ben Worcester - guitar, vocals
- Tyler Bancroft - guitar, vocals
- Jeff LaForge - bass, vocals
- Spencer Schoening - drums
- Laura Smith - keyboards

On Taking Abalonia (Tracks 8–15):

- Ben Worcester - guitar, vocals
- Tyler Bancroft - guitar, vocals
- Aidan Rantoul - bass
- Carey Pratt - drums
- Tom Dobranski - piano
