= Little Mountain (album) =

Studio album by Said the Whale
- Released: March 6, 2012
- Genre: Indie rock, hard rock
- Length: 48:53
- Label: Hidden Pony Records, EMI
- Producer: Tom Dobrzanski

Said the Whale chronology
New Brighton (2011)	Little Mountain (2012)	I Love You (2013)

Little Mountain is the third studio album from Said the Whale released March 6, 2012. The album, according to Vancouver Weekly, is "Said The Whale's most balanced offering yet" and is the first creation of the band that expands their horizons beyond talking about how much they love Vancouver (claimed to be a result of the band's first United States tour). "Heavy Ceiling" and "Loveless" both ranked in the top 30 of the Canadian Active Rock and Alternative Rock Charts, with the album itself reaching No. 19.

== Track listing ==
No.	Title	Length
1.	"We Are 1980"	3:12
2.	"Big Sky, MT"	5:06
3.	"Loveless"	3:14
4.	"The Reason"	3:39
5.	"O Alexandra"	2:37
6.	"Big Wave Goodbye"	4:35
7.	"Jesse, AR"	4:10
8.	"Lover/Friend"	2:31
9.	"Guilty Hypocrites"	0:50
10.	"2010"	3:38
11.	"Heavy Ceiling"	3:08
12.	"Hurricane Ada"	4:33
13.	"Safe Harbour"	1:40
14.	"Lucky"	3:37
15.	"Seasons"	2:23
16.	"A Lesson in Crime (Bonus track)"	3:39

== Singles ==
Year	Song	Chart peak	
Year	Song	CAN Alt	CAN Rock
2011	"Heavy Ceiling"	12	36
2012	"Loveless"	28	—
"—" denotes a release that did not chart.
