= Angela Trimbur =

American actress

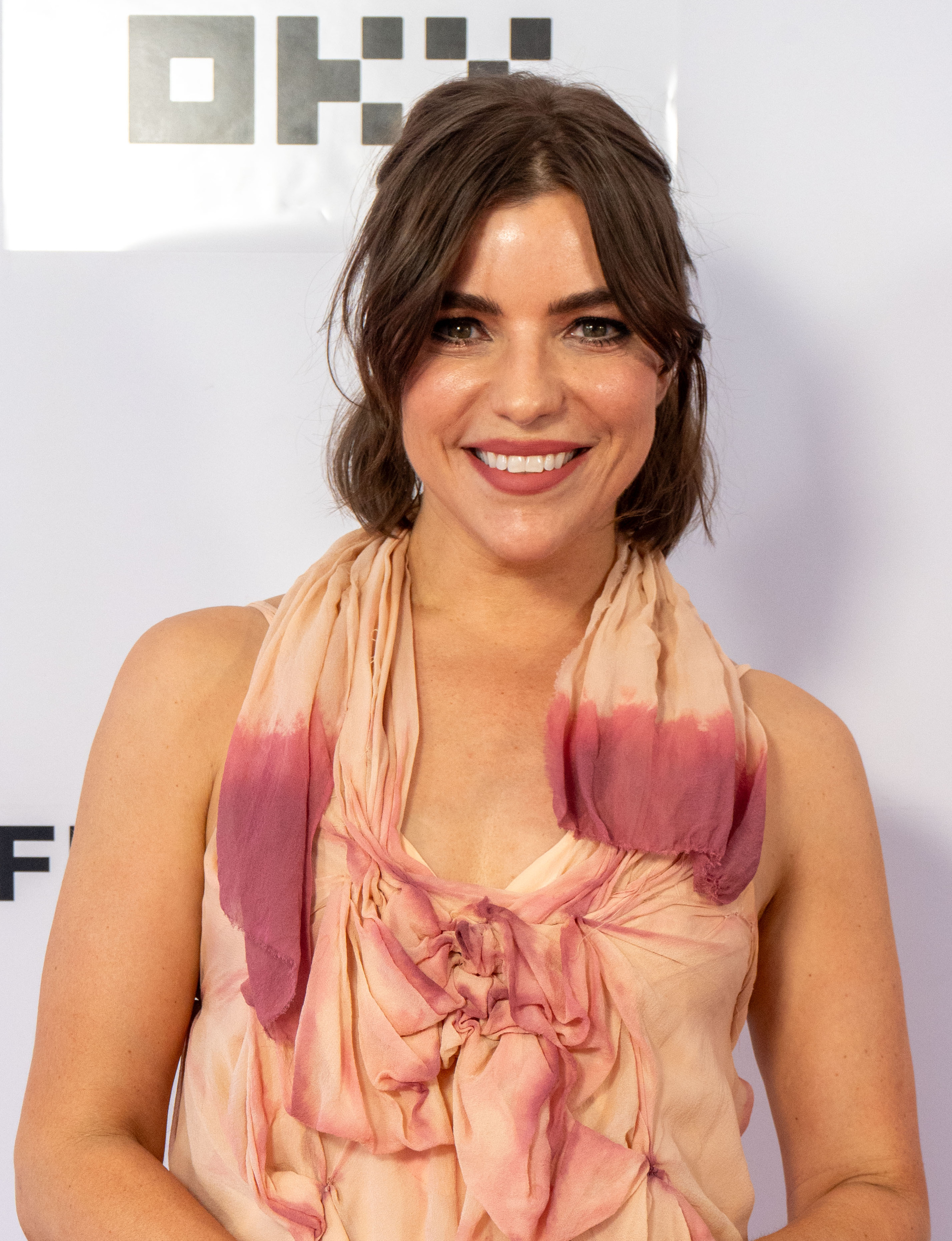
- Trimbur in 2026
- Born: Angela Denise Trimbur; July 19, 1981 (age 44); Bucks County, Pennsylvania, U.S.
- Occupations: Actress; comedian; dancer
- Years active: 2002–present

Angela Denise Trimbur (born July 19, 1981) is an American actress, writer, dancer, choreographer, and former reality television participant. She is best known for her role in Trash Fire.

== Personal life ==
Trimbur was born in Bucks County, Pennsylvania, on July 19, 1981. She attended Neshaminy High School and graduated in 1999. Prior to attending high school, She was homeschooled. She grew up a Jehovah's Witness, though she has stated she no longer practices the religion. Trimbur is a member of the Los Angeles-based basketball team Pistol Shrimps, alongside actress Aubrey Plaza. In 2014, she created the L.A. City Municipal Dance Squad, a team of dancers to perform a halftime show for the Los Angeles Women's Community Basketball pickup league, which quickly grew a large following. Angela began offering workshops and created events called "Slightly Guided Dance Party" hosted by the Museum of Contemporary Art with 300+ in attendance. Trimbur was featured in Time magazine in 2018, for building a unique community for women.

In July 2018, Trimbur was diagnosed with breast cancer. After undergoing treatment, she began hosting breast cancer support groups on Marco Polo to help others.

== Career ==
Before acting, Trimbur was a contestant on the thirteenth season of MTV's Road Rules: X-Treme. She was a replacement for Kina Dean, and went on to help her team win the Final Reward. It was revealed in the "Stunt School" challenge that Trimbur wanted to be an actress. She also participated in the Real World/Road Rules Challenge: Battle of the Sexes 2.

Trimbur began her acting career training in scene study at Sanford Meisner's Playhouse West, and improv at the Upright Citizens Brigade Theatre in Los Angeles. She has guest starred in episodes of The Good Place, Drunk History, Workaholics, Californication, Anger Management, Hand of God, and CSI: Cyber. Her appearance on Reno 911 was featured in the opening credits for Season 6.

Trimbur starred as Harley David in the 2009 slasher horror Halloween II. The following year, she portrayed the supporting role of Sassy in the 2010 comedy film Freak Dance. Also in 2010, Trimbur debuted an autobiographical show at the Los Angeles Upright Citizens Brigade Theater on her childhood titled Trapped: Life As A Homeschooled Jehovah's Witness. She then co-starred in the 2011 drama film The Future and the 2013 comedy-drama The Kings of Summer. In 2012, she played Cleopatra in the YouTube series Epic Rap Battles of History.

In 2015, Trimbur gained praise for her supporting role as Tina in the horror comedy The Final Girls. On April 28, 2015, Comedy Central bought an untitled comedy series created by Trimbur, Amanda Lund, and Maria Blasucci, which focuses on a misfit, all-female basketball team in Los Angeles. As of August 2018, Trimbur and Blasucci have appeared in the 2016 documentary film The Pistol Shrimps, about the actual recreational basketball team of the same name, but no further news regarding the possible Comedy Central series is available.

== Filmography ==
=== Film ===
Year	Title	Role	Notes
2006	Pink Lemonade	Natalie Pierce	
2007	Spin	Sarah	
2007	Brotherhood of Blood	Carla	
2007	Loaded	Amy	
2007	Learning to Score	Vanessa	Short film
2008	Float	Kristen	
2009	Halloween II	Harley David	
2009	The Harsh Life of Veronica Lambert	Paige	
2010	Freak Dance	Sassy	
2011	Worst. Prom. Ever	Sharon Waltershield	
2011	The Future	Dance Studio Receptionist	
2011	Out for Good	Joselyn	Short film
2013	The Kings of Summer	Face Paint	
2015	The Final Girls	Tina	
2016	Punching Henry	Sascha	
2016	Trash Fire	Isabel	Nominated – Fangoria Chainsaw Award for Best Supporting Actress
2016	The Pistol Shrimps	Herself	Documentary
2016	Laid in America	Amber	
2017	It Happened in L.A.	Simone	
2017	XX	Jess	
2017	Psychopaths	Blondie	
2017	The Feels	Lu	
2018	Hell Is Where the Home Is	Sarah	Also known as Trespassers
2020	Horse Girl	Julie	
2023	Quiz Lady	Marge	
2023	Dogleg	Julia	
2024	Lovers	Ash	
2026	Crooks	Faye	Post-production

=== Television ===
Year	Title	Role	Notes
2003	What Should You Do?	Bridgette	Episode: "Lesson Learned"
2004	Road Rules: X-Treme	Herself	
2004	Real World/Road Rules Challenge: Battle of the Sexes 2	Herself	
2005	Entourage	Jen	Episode: "The Sundance Kids"
2008	Imaginary Bitches	Angela	Episode: "A Spiritual Bitch-Bath"
2008	Hannah Montana	Girl	Episode: "Yet Another Side of Me"
2009	Reno 911!	Stripper	Episode: "Dangle's Murder Mystery: Part 1"
2009	Secret Girlfriend	Briana	Episode: "You and Your Ex Call It Quits"
2010	Fake It Til You Make It	Sarah	Episode: "Never Sleep with the Fans"
2010	Community	Student / Woman	2 episodes
2010–2012	CollegeHumor Originals	Various characters	3 episodes
2011	The Back Room	Marissa Microwave	Episode: "Scott Aukerman"
2012	Epic Rap Battles of History	Cleopatra	Episode: "Marilyn Monroe vs Cleopatra"
2013	Workaholics	Jenny The Darkness	Episode: "In Line"
2013	Californication	Tweaker Chick	2 episodes
2013	Royal Pains	Kiki	Episode: "Pregnant Paws"
2013–2014	The Birthday Boys	Various characters	4 episodes
2014	Anger Management	Dillon	Episode: "Charlie and the House Full of Hookers"
2015	Hand of God	Talia	Episode: "Contemplating the Body"
2015	Major Lazer	Penny Whitewall	Voice; 11 episodes
2015	Comedy Bang! Bang!	Melinda Grange	Episode: "Kid Cudi Wears a Denim Shirt and Red Sneakers"
2015	CSI: Cyber	Francine Krumitz	3 episodes
2016	New Girl	Mimi	Episode: "The Decision"
2016, 2018, 2020	The Good Place	Madison	3 episodes
2017	NCIS	Nicole Trainer	Episode: "M.I.A."
2017	One Mississippi	Phoebe	2 episodes
2018	Alone Together	Angela	Episode: "The Big One"
2019	Drunk History	USC Dropout Cult Member	Episode: "Good Samaritans"
2019	A Million Little Things	Tessa	Episode: "Austin"
2020	NCIS: Los Angeles	Janice Eckhart	Episode: "Commitment Issues"
2021	Bad Vibes	Nicole	2 episodes
2021	Search Party	Elodie	7 episodes
