= List of Johnny Test characters =

Promotional image featuring a majority of the series' characters. Left to right: Susan Test, Gil, Dukey (foreground), Hugh Test, Mr. White, Johnny Test, Mr. Black, Lila Test, Sissy Blakely, Mary Test.

This is a list of the many characters from the animated television series Johnny Test (including its revival). The main characters are Johnny Test, a fearless 11-year-old boy, and his genetically enhanced dog Dukey, as well as his two sisters Susan and Mary who are inventors.

== Main characters ==
=== Johnny Test ===
Johnny Test
- First appearance: "Johnny to the Center of the Earth"
- Created by: Scott Fellows
- Voiced by: James Arnold Taylor

In-universe information
- Full name: Jonathan Test
- Aliases: Johnny X Kid with the flaming hair
- Family: Hugh Test (father); Lila Test (mother); Susan and Mary Test (sisters); Dukey (pet)
- Spouse: Sissy Blakley (girlfriend)

Johnathan Avalon "Johnny" Test is the titular protagonist of the show, the brother of Susan and Mary and the youngest child of Hugh and Lila. He is a mischievous, egotistical, and unpredictable 11-year-old boy who's often called the "kid with the flaming hair" due to his hair having a flame-like appearance. Johnny can live any kid's dream because of his genius sisters, only to find that some aren't worth living. Despite being generally repulsed by girls, he has nurtured attraction towards his classmates Janet and Sissy, the latter out of hostile rivalry. As a procrastinator, Johnny goes to great lengths to avoid any work, often using his sisters' inventions to do so, putting himself and others in danger as a result. He also has a superhero alter ego that he calls "Johnny X", whose superpowers include hurricane hands (speeding wind from his hands), shapeshifting, fire-powered transformation, teleportation, ESP, and "power poots".

=== Dukey ===
Dukeson Leonard "Dukey" Test (voiced by Louis Chirillo in seasons 1–4, Trevor Devall in seasons 5–8) is Johnny's dog and best friend. He often serves as the voice of reason whenever Johnny is on the verge of making a destructive or hasty decision. Dukey was made anthropomorphic and capable of speech by one of Susan and Mary's inventions; he makes no effort to hide his true nature around Johnny, Mary, and Susan, but reverts to acting like a dog around others, including Hugh and Lila. In public, Dukey poses as a human with very long hair. He was originally named "Poochy" in the 2005 pitch pilot.

=== Susan and Mary Test ===
Susan and Mary Test (also known as the Test Twins) are Johnny's genius twin sisters and daughters of Hugh and Lila, who frequently use him as a lab rat for various inventions, most of which to impress their neighbor, Gil. Though they generally refuse to help Johnny in his antics, they usually end up doing so anyway due to Johnny blackmailing or manipulating them, or in exchange for Johnny allowing them to use him as a test subject. Their hard-headed demeanor makes them gullible, and they have been tricked by Johnny on various occasions. The Tests attend school at the Porkbelly (formally Mega) Institution of Technology.

- Susannah Laura "Susan" Test (voiced by Maryke Hendrikse) is the younger twin. A 13-year-old girl who's the sister of Mary and Johnny and the technical middle child of Hugh and Lila. Susan tends to be more irritable and harsh than Mary is, which often leads to her downfall. In the episode "Johnnymon," she claims to lack sympathy for anyone. Eugene/Bling-Bling expresses fond interest in Susan, much to her disinterest. When Bling-Bling pursues Susan, she tries to bribe Johnny into protecting her.
- Marionette Louise "Mary" Test (voiced by Brittney Wilson in season 1 and 5, Ashleigh Ball in seasons 2–4 and 6, Emily Tennant in Season 7 and 8) is the elder twin and the oldest child of Hugh and Lila. Mary is more friendly and warm-hearted than Susan. She believes less in science and more in science fiction, which somehow always proves to be correct, despite Susan's scorn. She is also more level-headed and conservative than Susan and speaks her mind much less often.

== Secondary characters ==
=== Hugh Test ===
Hubert "Hugh" Test (voiced by Ian James Corlett) is the grumpy but impractical stay-at-home father of the Test family and husband to Lila. Throughout the series, he is portrayed as the disciplinarian of the Test household since, unlike his wife, he has shown to be the one who is more likely to scold and punish his children, mostly Johnny. Hugh's two biggest obsessions are cleaning and cooking meatloaf which the rest of the Test family and anybody else openly despises. A running gag is that Hugh grounds his children for a month for even the smallest offense or for ridiculous reasons.

=== Lila Test ===
Lila Test (née Little) (voiced by Kathleen Barr) is the mild-mannered mother of Johnny, Susan, and Mary and wife of Hugh. She has brownish-reddish hair, green eyes (later cyan blue), and wears a typical women's work suit, pearl necklace, and heels. She is a businesswoman who specializes in telemarketing. Due to the demands of her job and the fact she's a workaholic, Lila isn't seen at home as often as the rest of the family, but her family always comes first and she never misses out on vacations and family events. Lila also possesses martial arts skills, was shown to be strong enough to defeat a towering caveman-themed wrestler, and is shown to be less strict than her husband, but sometimes forced against her will to take a break from work to relax. Lila has a scary/crazy side that even Hugh has shown fear when he makes mistakes in front of her. She is a dedicated perfectionist and will have a mental breakdown when pushed too far.

=== Gil Nexdor ===
Gilbert "Gil" Nexdor (voiced by Andrew Francis) is a handsome 15-year-old boy and Susan and Mary's crush who doesn't even know they exist, despite having lived next door to him since they were born and even having met them face to face on several occasions. He is continuously depicted as intellectually lacking, although his handsome looks compensate for this most of the time. Much to the great ire of Susan and Mary, Gil considers Johnny his friend (whenever Gil appears when Johnny is around, he shouts "Hey, Johnny!"). Due to Susan and Mary's crush, many of their experiments often revolve around him, on some occasions even affecting him directly. However, he can never seem to remember their names save for occasions. His name is actually a parody of the character archetype, Girl next door, of which Gil is a genderbent version of.

=== Mr. Black and Mr. White ===
Mr. Black (voiced by Bill Mondy) and Mr. White (voiced by Scott McNeil in the original series and Deven Mack in the revival series) are two secret agents who ask the Tests (Johnny, Mary, Susan, and Dukey) for help whenever they cannot handle a crisis alone. They seem to be highly incompetent and somewhat slackers at their job. Ironically, Mr. White is black and Mr. Black is white. Despite first appearing as villains, they're now friends to the Test kids on most occasions. They also have a hidden passion for cooking and dream of a vacation in Fiji.

=== General ===
The General (voiced by Lee Tockar) is Mr. White and Black's boss and leader of the area 51.1 army base. Loud, slightly incompetent, and forgetful, he frequently takes action whenever the situation becomes too large for the Tests to maintain, although his efforts never fare any better (he even causes the situations sometimes). Even though he doesn't approve of the Test Family and their experiments, he still considers them an ally. The General is prone to overkill and rarely considers what result his actions may have on civilians, to the point he fired at a forest, an inhabited area, and even an amusement park, all in an attempt to destroy a monster. He is also very prone to be a glory hog and gloater when he is successful. The running gags in the series involves the General forgetting something and hesitating to remember and planning to get Johnny, Dukey, Susan and Mary an internship when they graduate. The General also stated in an episode about the test kids “Once you graduate high school, you kids are SO hired!”

=== Sissy Blakely ===
Elisabeth Olivia "Sissy" Blakely (voiced by Brittney Wilson in Seasons 1 & 5 and Ashleigh Ball in Seasons 2–4 & 6) is a girl who tends to hide her crush on Johnny through bullying and asserting superiority over him. She is 11 years old around the same age as Johnny. Johnny also has a crush on her, but he doesn't seem to be aware of it. The two are constantly competing against each other. If Sissy beats him, she will brag about it. Whenever Johnny wins, he'll either get caught into a situation or brag as much as her. Although seen as his equal, Johnny often cheats most episodes. In "Saturday Night's Alright for Johnny" when Johnny pretends to be nice to her, their feelings are shown (along with Dukey and Missy). She seems to be the victim of the show's twists, adventures, and random outcomes; her misfortune often happens at the end of the episode. In later seasons, they become more friendly to each other and Sissy becomes more aware of her crush on Johnny (admitting to thinking he was cute in the 100th episode). She has blonde hair with a red lightning bolt pattern, multiple ear piercings, and a plaid skirt with pants underneath. She is not present in season 7 and 8.

=== Bumper Randalls ===
Mitchell "Bumper" Randalls (voiced by Scott McNeil) is a local bully who regularly tortures his peers at Porkbelly Middle School, especially Johnny, as he tortures him more than anyone else. However, he has a sensitive side as he loves roses and even has a rose garden. He has two cats: a white cat called "Cuddles" and an orange tomcat. In addition, Bumper also has a lizard named Mr. Muncher and a dog. Some episodes imply his father wants him to be a wrestler, but he only wants to grow flowers. So Bumper takes his anger out on Johnny, leading to him bullying all the time. In "Johnny X Strikes Back," he gains the power to turn to stone and flight or beat Bumper up. He does not appear in Seasons 7 and 8.

=== Henry Teacherman ===
Mr. Henry Joseph Teacherman (voiced by Louis Chirillo in Seasons 1–4, Trevor Devall in Season 5–8) is Johnny's teacher who Johnny claims "has it in for him". He seems to think that his students don't try hard enough and has been shown to like it when a student fails a test (rarely giving assignments on topics they never learn). At times, Mr. Teacherman has even conveyed to get sadistic pleasure out of punishing Johnny. Mr. Teacherman is always very tough, but not always to be mean. He believes that deep down, there is a great student inside of everyone including Johnny. It's shown that even Johnny can't reason, trick, or bribe him out of a challenging assignment or decision showing that he can be super stubborn and strict (as in autocratic).

== Supporting characters ==
=== Janet Nelson Jr. ===
Janet Nelson Jr. (voiced by Kathleen Barr) is Johnny's former love interest. Janet was a self-centered popular girl, that was usually mean and inconsiderate to him, appointing him as a loser. She had a love–hate relationship with him, but she is too popular to express the love part. Janet was a regular recurring character in the first season. By the second season, Sissy Blakely took over as Johnny's main love interest leading Janet to be written off. While Janet would continue to make cameos throughout the second and third seasons, by the fourth season, she had no longer been seen. Janet had long black hair parted in the middle with pink barrettes on the side, and wore a pink shirt, white pants, and purple shoes.

=== Hank Anchorman ===
Hank Anchorman (voiced by James Arnold Taylor) is an anchorman for Porkbelly News. In his first appearance, he had blond hair, was thinner and younger. In later episodes, Hank had brown hair (which was a wig), was older, and had a different face. He often reports about the Test family's shenanigans. He is highly devoted to his job to the point he will risk his well-being for a report/update on a story. Hank is also capable of breaking the fourth wall on certain occasions.

=== Mayor Howard ===
Mayor Howard (voiced by Lee Tockar) is the Mayor of Porkbelly. He is a short bald man who still lives with his mother. Howard easily panics at the first sign of trouble and will not hesitate to cave in to pressure. Whenever a supervillain appears, he would always agree to swear allegiance with the villain and change the city's name before the villain even says anything. Howard is an unreliable mayor due to his lack of reason, spending on the town, and his constant need for help at even the most simple solvable problems. At one point, Howard exhausted Johnny (as Johnny X) and Dukey (as Super Pooch) due to his constant calling for help, resulting in them "retire" their superhero identities for a while.

=== Principal Franklin Goode ===
Principal Franklin Goode (voiced by James Arnold Taylor) is the principal of Johnny's middle school who likes Johnny despite his antics which have caused large-scale destruction on more than one occasion. He always cuts Johnny slack for his antics and even denies Henry Teacherman's constant pleas of punishment for Johnny. However, if he does bail him out, Johnny must fulfill his end of the deal or he'll reverse the decision (which he rarely does because he always gives Johnny another chance). There are times when both Johnny and Henry have both gotten on Principal Goode's bad side, leading him to have no choice but to punish them much to their dismay.

=== Lunch Lady ===
The unnamed lunch lady (voiced by Kathleen Barr) at Porkbelly Middle School has greenish skin and speaks in a German accent. She can be very cruel when students don't eat her disgusting (albeit sometimes healthy) food. The lunch lady even becomes a nemesis to Johnny in an episode where she tries to destroy him for giving kids applesauce. She is very stubborn and will go to great lengths to make sure her food is eaten. She can also be a critic as she criticized and even laughed at Johnny's cause for applesauce even though she aggressively pushed her food onto the students and angrily denied anyone who requested anything else other than her food.

=== Professor Slopsink ===
Professor Slopsink (voiced by Richard Newman) is the German head professor at the Mega (later Porkbelly) Institute of Technology (M.I.T., later P.I.T). He is also Bling-Bling, the Test twins, and Tim Burnout's Teacher. Due to a mishap with one of Eugene's (Bling-Bling Boy) theses, Professor Slopsink lacks a left hand, so now he uses a robotic hand (though Repto-slicer ate that as well). He sometimes mistakenly doubts or underestimates his students' potential; which results in him being proven wrong, which he responds by giving them a high grade.

=== Mrs. Hamilton ===
Mrs. Hamilton (voiced by Lee Tockar) is the mother of Bling-Bling Boy and Mr. Hamilton's Wife. She is very harsh with her son and is always screaming, but is calmed by smooth talk.

=== Tim Burnout ===
Timothy "Tim" Burnout (voiced by Louis Chirillo in Seasons 1–4, Trevor Devall in Seasons 5–6) is a classmate of Susan and Mary and the former owner of Mr. Mittens. He copied the modified genetic structure used by Susan and Mary to enhance Dukey and used it on Mr. Mittens which turned him into an evil villain seeking world domination. Despite his lazy personality, Tim is apparently very intelligent as he was able to alter Mr. Mittens (despite stealing the idea). His last name refers to the way he acts.

=== Lolo ===
Lolo (voiced by Ashleigh Ball) is Susan and Mary's lab monkey on who they sometimes test their experiments. She loves bananas and is somewhat intelligent (possibly due to the sister's tests). Lolo has a strange metal hat piece on her head for an unexplained reason.

=== Missy ===
Missy Blakley (voiced by Ashleigh Ball in Seasons 2 onwards; Brittney Wilson in Season 5) is Sissy Blakley's pink labradoodle dog who seems to show the same amount of dislike to Dukey as Sissy does to Johnny. Dukey has a crush on her, but often displays the same hatred Johnny does for Sissy.

=== Repto-Slicer ===
Repto-Slicer (vocal effects provided by Andrew Francis) is a mutant lizard who can protrude razors from his entire body and has a chainsaw for a tongue. He was originally created by Eugene, who managed him very poorly. Repto-Slicer later decided to stay with Johnny after he tamed him. In a later episode, Repto-Slicer is transferred to Planet Razorium, where he lives happily with alien creatures who resemble him.

=== Jillian Vegan ===
Jillian Vegan (voiced by Maryke Hendrikse) is a humanoid alien from the planet Vegandon who is Dark Vegan's daughter. She disapproves of her father's evil ways and makes friends with Johnny by helping him save his world twice. As of the fourth season, Jillian lives comfortably on Earth, having integrated successfully into its culture.

=== Mrs. Vegan ===
Mrs. Vegan (voiced by Ashleigh Ball) is an alien from the planet Vegandon who is Dark Vegan's wife and Jillian's mother. Mrs. Vegan constantly nags about her husband's plans to take over the world.

=== The Turbo Toy Force ===
The Turbo Toy Force is a group of toys that were animated and given superpowers by Johnny, Dukey, Mary, and Susan to battle Nasteria. The group consists of Stacy, Nice Sweatered Ben, a toy bunny rabbit, a toy dragon, a chew toy, and formerly Mega Roboticle.

=== Speed McCool ===
Speed McCool (voiced by Lee Tockar) is a famous actor. In the movies he is in, he has a chimpanzee. Johnny is a fan of his and once used a virtual reality machine to get inside his films. He is a composite parody of James Bond and Speed Racer.

=== Montague ===
Montague (voiced by Lee Tockar) is an anarchist-talking mouse bent on world domination. He is a wild card, but will succumb to cheese. He appears in two episodes: in Johnny's Big Dumb Sisters, he makes brief cameos, but in Tom and Johnny, he has a more significant role, eventually helping out the Test siblings and Dukey. Montague becomes an antagonist in one episode where he tries to live in Johnny's house.

=== Dog Catcher ===
The unnamed Dog Catcher (voiced by James Arnold Taylor) is the owner of Porkbelly's Animal Control. His first appearance was in the episode "Here Johnny, Here Boy!" where he captured Johnny, Susan, and Mary after using the Animal Machine which turned them into animals (Johnny into a dog and Susan and Mary into lions). The Dog Catcher made minor appearances such as "Johnny's 100th Episode" where we see that Johnny first adopted Dukey.

=== Fillmore ===
Fillmore (voiced by Lee Tockar) is a clerk who works at the video game store "Game Galaxy" of which Johnny is a frequent customer. He made his first appearance in the episode "Phat Johnny" where Johnny made fun of him for his weight.

== Villains ==
=== Bling Bling Boy ===
Eugene "Bling-Bling Boy" Hamilton (voiced by Lee Tockar) is a prominent antagonist of the series and frenemy of Johnny and Dukey. He prefers to be called "Bling-Bling Boy" due to his gold jewelry and watches, but most characters usually address him by his real name, which annoys him greatly. He is a multi-billionaire with unlimited funds at his disposal and is also somewhat powerful among the characters despite having fears of being punished by his mother. He has a big crush on Susan, who doesn't reciprocate his feelings, and often resorts to evil plots or blackmail to win her affection, which always fails, usually courtesy of Johnny. Bling-Bling Boy occasionally teams up with Johnny and Dukey to defeat the other villains when the situation demands it. Similar to Susan and Mary, he often tricks Johnny into testing some of his inventions. Bling-Bling Boy also attended the Mega Institution of Technology, but was kicked out after his thesis ate Professor Slopsink's hand. He later was allowed to return to the Institute in exchange for aiding in preventing a nuclear crisis. In "Johnny X Strikes Back," Bling-Bling Boy gains the power of gold vision and flight. In the 2005 pitch pilot, he was originally named "Golden Boy" and appeared to be designed much younger.

==== Miss X and Miss Z ====
Miss X and Miss Z (voiced by Brittney Wilson in Season 1, Maryke Hendrikse in Season 2) are two cyborgs created by Bling-Bling Boy to work at their disposal. They can operate and have a mind of their own when Bling-Bling is not around or in need. Miss X and Miss Z have high intelligence, capable of studying at the Institute Of Porkbelly, and avoid attention. Throughout the seasons, they are more robotic and shown to have more than one pair of them. Miss X and Miss Z only appeared in the first two seasons of the show.

=== Wacko ===
Wacko (voiced by Colin Murdock) is Johnny Test's second archenemy of the show. Despite being a toymaker and the head of the toy company Wacko Toys, he deeply loathes kids and makes incredibly destructive toys to rid the world of them. He seems quite intelligent and quite wealthy despite the bad publicity he brings to his company. Wacko would come up with plans to get rid of kids which often annoys his employees who constantly remain loyal to him. He is the leader of the Johnny Stopping Evil Force 5 where he formed its first incarnation with Brain Freezer, Beekeeper, Mr. Mittens, and Mr. Mittens' butler Albert with King Zizrar being part of the second incarnation when Beekeeper turns good. Wacko is obsessed with destroying Johnny and the Tests at almost every chance he gets, due to Johnny foiling his plans in the past, making him go mentally insane. He is so obsessed with Johnny, he'll carelessly risk his own safety or other people just to gain an advantage over The Tests. Wacko is later revealed to have a twin brother named the Tickler.

His name is a porteamu of Wham-O, a real-life toy company, and Wacko, fittingly, means "a crazy person."

=== Brain Freezer ===
Brain Freezer (voiced by Bill Mondy) is the former coffee guy of P.I.T. He is a self-proclaimed genius with his inventions typically involving both coffee and ice. Brain Freezer has a "Chillachino Machine" that can freeze anything including creating armor made of ice. It appears that Brain Freezer is immune to the blasts from his freeze gun as he uses them to transform into his supervillain form by blasting himself, but his "Chillachino" will still freeze him solid if he drinks it. In one episode, the reason for Brain Freezer's villainy is that he's just lonely and that girls constantly reject him (which he responds with insanity/madness and hatred) leading his character to be a sympathetic villain. After Season 4, Brain Freezer becomes a frenemy to Johnny.

He is a parody of Arnold Schwarzenegger's portrayal of Mr. Freeze from Batman & Robin due his frequent use of ice puns.

=== The Beekeeper ===
The Beekeeper (voiced by James Arnold Taylor) is a man in a beekeeper's suit that can control bees. His secret identity is Doc Beebles, maker of Piles 'O Honey Bars (named after the Bit-O-Honey candy). His debut plot was to use his bees to eat all other candy in the world so his Piles 'O Honey Bars would finally sell (nobody bought his bars because they were naturally sweet and healthy), though Doc really wanted the kids to be healthier. After his first defeat, Beekeeper joined the Johnny Stopping Evil Force 5. He does later help out the Test siblings and Dukey saves a candy holiday that they created by giving his Piles 'O Honey Bars to every child in the world. Due to this, Beekeeper is currently reformed and likes the Tests leading him to be replaced by King Zizrar on the Johnny Stopping Evil Force 5. Beekeeper loves saying "bee" as "be" as a pun when he's wearing his beekeeper suit.

=== Mr. Mittens ===
Mr. Mittens (voiced by James Arnold Taylor) is an evil cat who was enhanced with the same modified genetic structure as Dukey by his owner Tim Burnout. It was mentioned that Tim was a terrible owner to Mr. Mittens due to the fact that Tim never cleans out his litter box. He very commonly tries to turn the entire world into cats in his evil plans like he did in his first appearance or he plans to have revenge on Johnny and Dukey eventually becoming one of his arch-enemies. In one episode, Mr. Mittens claims to want revenge on Johnny when in reality, he's just lonely like Brain Freezer. Like Dukey, he is highly intelligent but seems to lack Dukey's fighting skills and luck. Mr. Mittens also loves to cheat in competitions which usually backfires with instant karma. A running gag of his is that he coughs up hairballs at specific moments. In the 2021 series, he has a scar on his right eye.

==== Albert ====
Albert (voiced by Lee Tockar) is Mr. Mittens' aforementioned butler who used to serve Mr. Mittens' owner Tim Burnout. Albert isn't seen hating Johnny, but he was forced into the squad because he has to take care of Mr. Mittens all the time (it is debated if he's a villain or he's just doing his job). He is quite calm and down to earth. Albert has shown that he can't be tickled, even by the best machines (in fact, he broke and overloaded a machine in the process of being tickled) at the time when Johnny Test faced off against Wacko's twin brother the Tickler. He has also shown to have matching intelligence as his master. A running gag is that when Mr. Mittens coughs up hairballs at specific moments, Albert would clean it up.

He is a parody of Alfred Pennyworth from the Batman franchise.

=== King Zizrar ===
King Zizrar (voiced by Scott McNeil) is the ruler of the mole people who on a few occasions attempted to take over the world or invade the surface only to fail due to his intense aversion to light. He's charismatic and a good tactician, but can be a pushover at times and a coward when the odds don't work in his favor. King Zizrar is the first villain Johnny ever fought, though is among the least-recurring villains. After the Beekeeper reformed from the Johnny-Stopping Evil Force Five, King Zizrar took his place. While earliers King Zizrar was very small and short in season 1, being about half Johnny's size, later seasons had him much bigger and taller, being roughly the same height as Johnny.

=== Dark Vegan ===
Dark Vegan (voiced by James Arnold Taylor) is the alien ruler of Vegandon, a seemingly utopian planet composed completely of the Vegans, humanoids who at first appear peaceful and well-meaning, but in reality, they go to other planets and sap them of their resources which is what he tried to do to Earth on two occasions and nearly succeeded.

After his second attack on Earth, he and his family were left stranded on Earth, much to the ire of Vegan and the pleasure of his family. Although Johnny eventually helped him to return to Vegandon, he later returned to Earth and became a regular resident after discovering his planet was incapable of producing his new favorite food: toast.

Dark Vegan has a mind-control power that works only on dumb people. He is Jillian's father and is very overprotective of her (he threatens the Earth/Johnny with destruction if his daughter isn't satisfied or if it doesn't meet his standards). Later in the series, Dark Vegan appears as a wildcard of The Tests (he constantly changes from ally to enemy, especially to Johnny).

He is a composite parody of Darth Vader from Star Wars and Dark Helmet from Spaceballs due to having the latter's retractable face covering on his helmet and the formers voice-deepening effect.

=== Minor villains ===
The following are minor villains that Johnny went up against:

- The Caveman: Appeared in the episode "Stinkin Johnny", the Caveman is a towering caveman-themed wrestler. Johnny wants to enter a wrestling competition so that he can win a new HDTV. Before wrestling, Susan and Mary make a costume for Johnny which allows him to spray gas out of his costume. Before Johnny beats The Caveman at the competition, Johnny sprays gas at Bumper, three evil dogs, and his dad. First, The Caveman defeated a wrestler named Brack-Breaker when he threw him out of the cage defeated. When Johnny was about to spray The Caveman with his costume, he realized that he ran out of perfume after spending it on the wrestlers in line and gets chased by The Caveman. Johnny gets kidnapped by the Caveman, and Dukey, Susan, and Mary try to rescue Johnny but they get kicked out. Johnny's dad shows up but he gets thrown out as well. When Johnny was about to be beaten up by the Caveman, his mom appears to save him. After Lila beats the Caveman, she saves Johnny and wins $10,000. In the end, Johnny and Dukey both get grounded from TV, and Susan and Mary both get grounded from the lab.
- Blast Ketchup (voiced by Kathleen Barr): The main character of the Tiny'Mon games, Blast Ketchup has dreams of becoming the World's Greatest Tiny'Mon Master. Ever since Johnny was trapped in their world and Blast was defeated by Johnny, it became his goal to defeat Johnny in Tiny'Mon to become the Tiny'Mon champion he self-proclaims deserves. It is easy for him to detect tricks and is not under using dirty tactics to win such as kidnapping. He always takes the first words of what people say, mistaking them as Tiny'Mon. He is a parody of Ash Ketchum from the Pokémon series.
  - Ed: Blast Ketchup's friend and cheerleader. He's always considered everyone as a loser, despite showing a lack of social skills and experience in Tiny'Mon.
  - Screechereen: Evolved from the almost completely weak Cuddlebuns. She is a legendary Tiny'mon that many believed didn't exist and is incredibly strong. In Return of Johnny'mon, she is brought up as female. She resembles Lugia from the Pokémon series.
  - Cuddlebuns: A cute but weak Tiny'mon. In fact, it is the weakest Tiny'mon ever. In Johnny'mon, it is revealed that it can evolve into Screechereen when given love.
  - Baboomerang and Badias: Blast Ketchup's Tiny'Mons. Baboomerang (formerly Kadoomerang) is listed with 1000 Power Point's, while Badias has 1100. Baboomerang appeared as an anthropomorphic baboon. He wore armor, a belt, and a diaper. Badias appeared like Screechereen but in black.
- Claire Nefarius (voiced by Kathleen Barr): A character who appeared in the episode "The Quantum of Johnny". She is the daughter of Larius Nefarius. In the episode, she had a birthday party and hid to launch missiles into her father's factory (which was nearby) to get her dad to spend more time with her. Johnny constantly mentions that she is hot. At the end of the episode, Larius Nefarius learned of his mistake and promised to spend more time with her and act like a father. He started by forbidding her from dating Johnny because she is too young.
- Warty (voiced by James Arnold Taylor): Johnny's talking wart who appeared in the episode "Johnny's Got a Wart!". He started as a regular wart until he was brought to life. Although Johnny was unsure how he obtained a wart on his left wrist. Worried, Dukey took him to the Lab, hoping Susan and Mary get rid of it. They shot it with a "laser", though it failed. Later at school, the wart came to life and became helpful to Johnny: he helped him remember his locker combination, got him an "A" in math, confronted Bumper by revealing his inner soft side, and got Johnny an invite to a party with cheerleaders. After school, Warty grew eyes that Johnny thought was creepy. Warty became evil and took over Johnny's body (by controlling his brain and nerves) and then the world though was stalled since he struggled to control Johnny and couldn't do so until he had complete control of Johnny's brain.
- The Tickler (voiced by Colin Murdock): The Tickler is Wacko's twin brother. He has red hair and mechanical arms that he uses to tickle people who threaten him into submission. At one point, Johnny thought he was Wacko until the Tickler corrected him. Unlike his brother, he was more evil and serious and was able to weaken Johnny's chances of defeating him by kidnapping Susan and Mary and taking their weapons so Johnny and Dukey couldn't fight back. However, they succeeded in defeating the Tickler after receiving help from Zizrar (who advises them to use the element of surprise), Dark Vegan (who lends Johnny and Dukey helmets to deepen their voices so they sound more intimidating), Mr. Mittens (who tells Johnny to use amusing and well-fitting catchphrases), and Albert (who is the only one who is not ticklish).

== Other characters ==
- Extreme Teen Team: Appeared in the episode "Johnny Test: Extreme Crime Stopper". In that episode, they stole all the drinks and snacks at a store at night without paying. At the end of the episode, they were caught and sent to jail. They also made minor appearances throughout the series.
- Super Smarty Pants: A pair of pants that allow the user to gain higher intellectual abilities. It first appeared in the episode "Johnny's Super Smarty Pants". It has artificial intelligence and surprisingly, strong obsessive emotions for Johnny. It also has a strong hate for Dukey and The Smarty Pants will harm Dukey every chance it gets. It reappeared in "The Return of Johnny Super Smarty Pants" all the way from Antarctica to get back Johnny and take control of his brain.
- Construction Drones: Robots created by Susan and Mary are used to aid them in building their inventions. Johnny, however, uses them whenever he can to his advantage. They can build everything that they were commanded to do. From tables, benches, and pancakes, to giant and advanced tree houses or houses referencing a horror show. They have the ability to turn their hands to brushes and tools and transform their feet to wheels. They're intelligent, fast, and handy. but they do have some weaknesses, such as working so fast and hard makes them get short-circuited.
- Jeffy (voiced by Ashleigh Ball): A character first appearing in "Johnny's No. 1 Fan." He claims to be Johnny's Number 1 fan. At first, he was nice to Johnny but took things too far. He becomes Dark Vegan's Number 1 Fan at the end of the episode. Jeffy returns in the second season of the revival in "Johnny Con," where he impersonates Johnny's alter ego "Johnny X."
- Mega Roboticle: Johnny's red hero robot action figure that he used Susan and Mary's 'Static Animator' to bring to life. Mega Roboticle is the former leader of The Turbo Toy Force.
- Moonsies (also called Moon Fiends): The idiotic and evil blue aliens that live on the moon. A bunch of evil Moonsies attacked Johnny and Dukey in outer space when they came to the moon to research Johnny's paper. The army of Moonsies ate a lot of spice cheese nachos, which gave them stink gas and fart on Johnny and Dukey. The leader sent all Moonsies to attack the duo, only for Johnny to use the knowledge from his report (and the report itself) to defeat them all and escape. Despite the Moonsies being present in the first season opening, their only appearance was in the episode "Johnny Gets Mooned".
- Road Burn: A living, white and yellow monster truck built by Bling-Bling Boy, he has a golden chassis, diamond rims, and diamond lights. Bling-Bling Boy uses Road Burn in an attempt to impress Susan. But after she expresses disinterest, Bling-Bling Boy then kicks him for not winning Susan's heart, Road Burn suddenly becomes alive, knocks Bling-Bling Boy away and goes on a rampage destroying any monster truck he comes across. He can withstand flame throwers and missiles, breathe fire out of his mouth and chomp through vehicles. Road Burn later reforms after meeting Ginger, a female-esque monster truck built by Johnny and Dukey, and lets them play with his son. Despite being present in the first season opening, his only appearance was in the episode "Johnny And The Attack Of The Monster Truck".
- Boyborgs: Robotic machines, Phil, Bill, and Will, designed to look like Gil Nexdor, built by Susan and Mary Test. They are the main antagonists of "Johnny vs. Super Soaking Cyborgs" after they learn that the Twins love Gil more than them and attempt to eliminate him.
- Ms. Blakely: A minor character who appeared in the episode "Johnnyitis". She is Sissy Blakely's mother.
- Mrs. Majekowski (voiced by Kathleen Barr): A minor character who appeared in the episode "No Homework for Johnny". She is an elderly cat lady. The Homework Buddy steals the cookies she makes, which questions Johnny where it gets them from. Additionally, there is a similarly named character in another Scott Fellows created show, Big Time Rush.
- Branson Ridgeway (voiced by Lee Tockar): A minor character who first appeared in the episode "Johnny's Trophy Case". He was the creator of the Bike Jump Stunt contest. He made another appearance in "Johnny Rich".
- Larius Nefarius (voiced by James Arnold Taylor): A character who appeared in the episode "The Quantum of Johnny". He was first thought to be a villain but near the end of the episode, it is discovered that his daughter Claire was the real villain. Since he spends most of his time working, he barely has time for her. He is a parody of Ernst Stavro Blofeld, a James Bond supervillain.
- Mrs. Crabapple (voiced by Maryke Hendrikse): A character who first appeared in the episode "Who's Johnny". She teaches the "special classes". Students who appear in her class, like Bumper, are called "Bad Apples". She made another appearance in "Johnny Susan Susan Johnny".
- King Fufassel (voiced by Bill Mondy): A character who appeared in the episode "Princess Johnny". He is the ruler of Schmuldavia. He was at war with Muldavia's Princess Maribel over corn dog production rights, but Johnny managed to end the war when he pretended to be Princess Maribel and forced him to have a treaty/truce.
- Princess Maribel (voiced by Ashleigh Ball): A character who appeared in the episode "Princess Johnny". She looks very identical to Johnny; except she is a girl, (which ironically Johnny finds unattractive) lacks Johnny's hair highlights and wears a dress. She is the princess of Muldavia. It was at war with Schmuldavia led by King Fufassel. She goes missing and Johnny is recruited by Black & White to masquerade as her until she is found. She's eventually found in the hotel's arcade, dressed like Johnny. Johnny empathizes with her and after finding her after she ran away, threatened her guardian to give her more leisure time.
- Hotel Manager: An unnamed hotel manager who first appeared in the episode "Johnny Test in 3D". He does not allow pets in the hotel. The hotel manager can smell wherever an animal, such as a dog, is in the hotel. This has led to him stalking Johnny when he snuck Dukey into the hotel. When the hotel manager does catch Johnny and Dukey in their room by the time the rest of the Tests arrived, Lila got him to back off by threatening to move her conference to another hotel. He made several cameo appearances in later episodes.
- Tyler (voiced by Kathleen Barr): An overweight boy who enjoys eating his boogers. He made his first appearance in "Johnny Mint Chip". He used to be gross and immature (as seen in the episode "Johnny's New BFF") but then became a teenager. He made several cameo appearances throughout the rest of the series.
- Wendell (voiced by Ashleigh Ball): A boy who enjoys insects. He made his first and only appearance in the episode "Johnny's New BFF".
- Dawg & Bone (voiced by James Arnold Taylor and Louis Chirillo respectively): The two characters that came from the TV in Johnny's house, with Susan and Mary's invention. Dawg & Bone try to destroy Johnny and Porkbelly since they think they are zombies. Since they live in a cartoon world in a cartoon, their cartoon rules are stronger than Johnny and Dukey's, they also can give punishment as much they can take. Johhny and Dukey claim to dislike this show, despite having strong similarities to the show's main characters. In fact, Johnny and Dukey broke the Fourth Wall a few times realizing how similar they are but can't put their finger on how or not realizing the similarities.
- High-Pitched Hal (voiced by Andrew Francis): A character who appeared in the episode "Johnny Tube". He is a popular star on Snoobtube (a parody of YouTube) and received a movie deal in Hollywood.
- Truant officer (voiced by James Arnold Taylor): An unnamed truant officer who appeared in "Johnny Test's Day Off". Johnny decides to ditch his school after a rough week until he sees the officer driving by. Johnny and Dukey hid in Lila's car until they were at P.I.T. Susan & Mary come outside and tell Johnny that they don't want to help him, but the truant officer catches up and puts Susan and Mary into the back of his truck in an attempt to take them to Johnny's school since he doesn't think that they should be in college but Johnny distracts him and Dukey helps them out. The truant officer chases the 4 throughout the city.
- Kirk Kirkland (voiced by Scott McNeil): A character who appeared in the episode "Johnny Boat Racing". Kirk and his team are national champions in boat racing. They challenged Johnny, Dukey, and their friends in a boat race after Johnny questioning why their rowing when nowadays we have motorboats.
- Willy Keller (voiced by James Arnold Taylor): A minor character who appeared in the episode "Johnny Daddy Day". He used to be Hugh's best friend when he was 10 years old until they hated each other after Hugh stole Willy's girlfriend in high school. Johnny and his sisters learned that the hard way. He made another cameo appearance in "Black & White & Johnny All Over"
- Xeandra (voiced by Maryke Hendrikse): A character who appeared in the episode "Fangs A Lot Johnny". She is a movie star who appears in a vampire movie in the Porkbelly Movie Theater. Gil Nextor is a huge fan of her. She is a caricature of Kristen Stewart who portrays the fictional character Bella Swan in the Twilight novel series and Black Lemonade Cookie from CookieRun: Kingdom.
- Joni West (voiced by Kathleen Barr): The female counterpart of Johnny Test. She made her first appearance in "Johnny Alternative" along with her best friend and female counterpart of Dukey, Dutchy. She and Dutchy teamed up with Johnny and Dukey to get rid of the counterparts of Albert and Mr. Mittens. In the episode, she seemed to like or have a crush on Johnny. Her first thought was disgusting, then, later on, he ended saving her from being turned into a kitten, she was touched and they almost ended up kissing but Johnny went back to his world. She made another appearance in the web series, starting with the episode "The League of Johnnys".
  - Dutchy (voiced by Maryke Hendrikse): The female counterpart of Dukey. She made her first appearance in "Johnny Alternative". She's the pet and the best friend of Joni and has the same personality as Dukey. She has a brief crush on Dukey.
  - Simon and Mark West (voiced by Ian James Corlett and Trevor Devall respectively): The male counterparts of Susan and Mary Test. They made their first appearances on the episode "Johnny Alternative" when Johnny Test and Dukey were sucked into a portal that sent them into Simon and Mark's world. Simon and Mark's parents might look the same as Susan and Mary's parents because there is a picture in their house that looks exactly like Lila Test.
- Betty Crumper (voiced by Brittney Wilson): A minor character that appears in "Johnny Alternative". She is the female counterpart of Bumper.
- Eugenia "Glam-Glam Girl" (voiced by Lee Tockar): The female counterpart of Bling-Bling Boy who makes her only appearance in the episode "Johnny Alternative". She has a huge crush on Simon, just like the way Bling-Bling Boy has a crush on Susan Test.
- Phobious McPhobe (voiced by Trevor Devall): A character appearing in "Johnny Germ Fighter". McPhobe is a famous Hygienist and a scientist who loves to get rid of germs at any time (he even made bathroom cleaning foams) and wishes to make the world a cleaner place. Hugh once (when he was a kid in a camp) got a badge from him for being a clean and careful scout (Hugh explained that after that nobody has ever seen him) but it appeared that he quit his job when he sneezed once while he was cleaning the bathroom when he was younger. (McPhobe said that his cleanness got under doubt and he decided to never get back to his work again) after that he built a foam-making laboratory, becoming an alone scientist. He first refused to help Johnny and Dukey about getting rid of the germs (telling that he doesn't do this anymore) but finally decided to help them by making an ingredient that can kill the germs but after Johnny accidentally poured down an "attracting ingredient", it made the germs attack the lab, forcing McPhobe, Johnny and Dukey to escape from the lab and McPhobe destroy the lab with all of the germs in it. After that, with Hugh's suggestion, he lived with the Test family until his lab was rebuilt.
- Monty Butterworth (voiced by Ian James Corlett): A spoiled rich kid and a mutual enemy of Bling-Bling Boy and Johnny who was first seen in "Mush, Johnny, Mush".
- Clyde (voiced by Scott McNeil): Susan and Mary's pet orangutan. He first appeared in "Johnny and Clyde". Since he's an orangutan, he copies everything that people do on TV which causes a lot of trouble for Johnny and Dukey when he learned how to rob banks from watching TV.
