= Brent Hodge =

Canadian documentary filmmaker (born 1985)

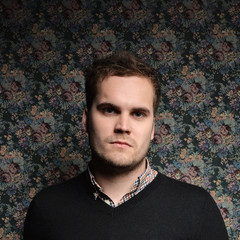
- Hodge in 2015
- Born: July 9, 1985 (age 41); St. Albert, Alberta, Canada
- Occupations: Filmmaker, entrepreneur
- Years active: 2008–present
- Website: www.hodgeefilms.com

Brent Hodge (born July 9, 1985) is a Canadian-New Zealander documentary filmmaker and entrepreneur. He is best known for his documentaries I Am Chris Farley, A Brony Tale, The Pistol Shrimps, Freaks and Geeks: The Documentary, Chris Farley: Anything for a Laugh, Who Let the Dogs Out and Pharma Bro. He has been nominated for six Leo Awards for his documentary movies Winning America, What Happens Next? and A Brony Tale, winning one for A Brony Tale in 2015. He was nominated for two Shorty Awards under the "director" category in 2014 and 2015 for his work on The Beetle Roadtrip Sessions and A Brony Tale. Hodge also won a Canadian Screen Award in 2014 for directing The Beetle Roadtrip Sessions with Grant Lawrence.

The documentary The Pistol Shrimps (2016), follows a LA-based female basketball team, the Pistol Shrimps — including actress Aubrey Plaza and founder Maria Blasucci (Drunk History) — who come together for weekly matches filled with trash-talking, hard-fouling, wisecracking action. The documentary was co-produced with Warrior Poets and Morgan Spurlock as executive producer. The documentary won a Founders Award at Michael Moore's Traverse City Film Festival in July 2016. The film is distributed by NBC's subscription streaming service, Seeso and available online.

Hodge directed I Am Chris Farley in 2015 with Derik Murray of Network Entertainment. The documentary is based on the life of comedian actor Chris Farley and features interviews with numerous actors, comedians and others who worked with Farley during his career. The film was long listed for an Academy Award.

In 2014, Hodge released his critically acclaimed documentary A Brony Tale. It delves into the world of the teenage and adult fans of the television show My Little Pony: Friendship is Magic (called "bronies") through the eyes of musician and voice actress Ashleigh Ball on her trip to the 2012 BronyCon.

== Early life ==
Hodge grew up in the City of St. Albert, Alberta, but moved to Victoria, British Columbia at the age of 12. He was first exposed to filmmaking in his entrepreneur class at Mount Douglas Secondary School. After high school he attended University of Victoria for a year before completing a degree in commerce at the University of Otago in Dunedin, New Zealand. Upon completing his degree he returned to Canada, attending School Creative in Vancouver, during which time he did sketch comedy with Chris Kelly, Zahf Paroo as well as Ryan Steele and Amy Goodmurphy from The Ryan and Amy Show. Hodge holds dual citizenship for both New Zealand and Canada.

== Hodgee Films ==
Hodgee Films
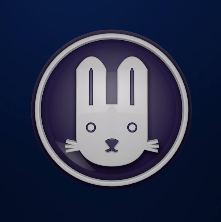
- Industry: Films
- Founded: 2012
- Founder: Brent Hodge
- Headquarters: Vancouver, British Columbia, Canada
- Key people: Brent Hodge, founder and director
- Products: Film
- Number of employees: 5
- Website: www.hodgeefilms.com

Hodgee Films is a Vancouver-based independent film company. Their films include A Brony Tale, The Pistol Shrimps, Freaks and Geeks: The Documentary, Who Let the Dogs Out and Pharma Bro.

Pharma Bro, co-produced by Blumhouse Productions, profiles Martin Shkreli, the financial entrepreneur and pharmaceutical tycoon from Brooklyn, New York, known for raising the price of an AIDS drug 5500% overnight, buying the sole copy of a Wu-Tang Clan album for $2 million and being convicted of securities fraud. Release for the film is October 5, 2021.

Who Let the Dogs Out tells the origin story of the smash hit song "Who Let the Dogs Out" and goes back further than anyone could have imagined; steeped in legal battles, female empowerment and artist integrity. The film premiered in 2019 at SXSW and can be found on Bell's Crave TV start March 2, 2020.

Produced by A&E Network as part of the "Cultureshock" series, Freaks and Geeks: The Documentary covers the production of the television show created by Paul Feig and executive produced by Judd Apatow. Through interviews with the cast and crew, the documentary describes the history of the program, which was cancelled after one season and included in Time magazine's list of television shows.

The documentary The Pistol Shrimps (2016), follows a LA-based female basketball team, the Pistol Shrimps — including actress Aubrey Plaza and founder Maria Blasucci (Drunk History) — who come together for weekly matches filled with trash-talking, hard-fouling, wisecracking action. The documentary won a Founders Award at Michael Moore's Traverse City Film Festival in July 2016. The film is distributed by NBC's subscription streaming service, Seeso and available online.

Hodge directed I Am Chris Farley in 2015 with Derik Murray of Network Entertainment. The documentary is based on the life of comedian actor Chris Farley and features interviews with numerous actors, comedians and others who worked with Farley during his career. The film was long listed for an Academy Award.

In 2014, Hodge released his critically acclaimed documentary A Brony Tale. It delves into the world of the teenage and adult fans of the television show My Little Pony: Friendship Is Magic (called "bronies") through the eyes of musician and voice actress Ashleigh Ball on her trip to the 2012 BronyCon. The film was nominated for six 2015 Leo Awards, including "Best Documentary", won "Best Documentary" at the 2014 Las Vegas Film Festival and premiered at the 2014 Tribeca Film Festival.

The company also produced W Network's spinoff series Cameron's House Rules.

In 2014 Hodge was named one of BCBusiness's Top 30 under 30 for his work as CEO of Hodgee Films. Hodge stated that he had given himself a goal to hit a certain revenue target, film globally and bring his work back to Vancouver for post-production work.

The company logo, a white rabbit with the text "Hodgee Films" next to it, was inspired by the film Alice in Wonderland, says CEO of the company Brent Hodge: "I always go back to the little logo I have, which is a white rabbit. It comes from Alice in Wonderland and it's about having that magic in everything we do. Down the rabbit hole."

== Filmography ==
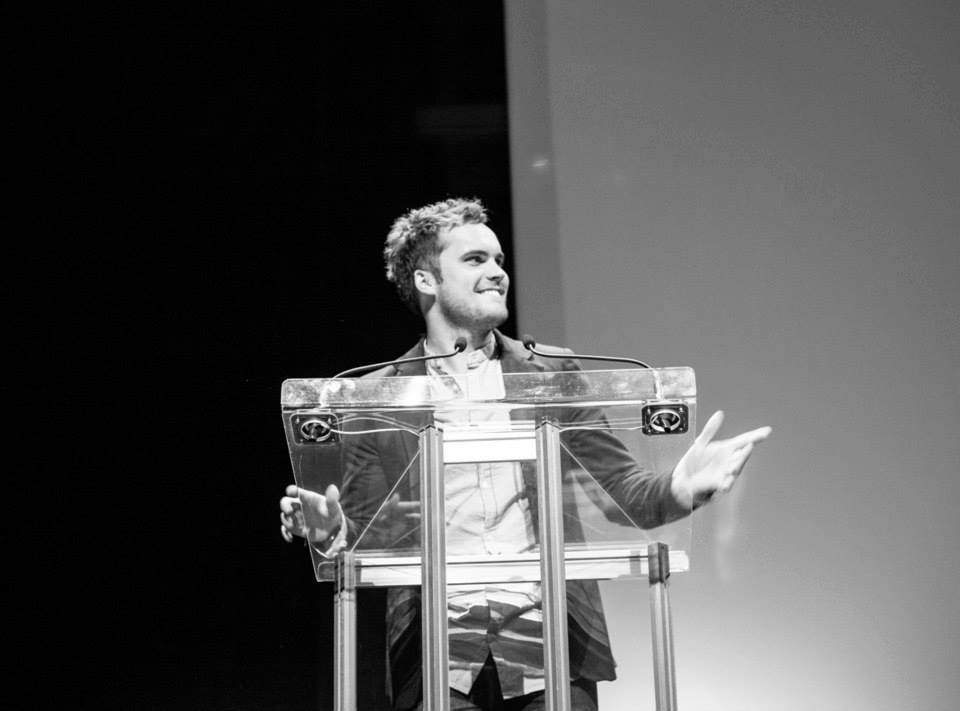
Hodge at the 2014 DOXA Film Festival

Year	Film	Notes
2008	Paradise Lost	Actor
2008	Smallville	Actor
2009	Rampage	Actor
2011	The Cockumentary	Director/producer/subject
2011	Winning America	Director/producer; nominated for a Leo Award for Best Documentary in 2012
2012	What Happens Next?	Director/producer; nominated for a Leo Award for Best Documentary in 2013
2013	The Beetle Roadtrip Sessions with Grant Lawrence	Director; won a Canadian Screen Award in 2014
2013	Hue: A Matter of Colour	Camera operator
2014	A Brony Tale	Director/writer/producer; premiered at 2014 Tribeca Film Festival, won Best Documentary at the Las Vegas Film Festival and holds a 100% "Fresh" rating on Rotten Tomatoes; nominated for four Leo Awards, including Best Feature Documentary and Best Director; won the Leo Award for "Best Overall Sound"
2014	Violent	Executive producer; showcased at the Cannes Film Festival, screened the Karlovy Vary Film Festival, and the Vancouver International Film Festival where it won "Best Canadian Film" and "Best British Columbia Film"; nominated for nine Leo Awards, winning eight, including "Best Picture" and "Best Director"; nominated for an Academy Award for "Best Foreign Language Film"
2015	I Am Chris Farley	Director/editor; premiered in August on Spike TV
2015	Cameron's House Rules	Director/producer/editor; TV mini-series
2015	Consider the Source	Director/producer/editor; in association with Disney's Maker Studios and Morgan Spurlock
2016	The Pistol Shrimps	Director/producer/writer/editor; in association with Warrior Poets, a documentary starring Aubrey Plaza about a women's basketball team made up of comedians, models and actresses
2018	Freaks and Geeks: The Documentary	Director/Producer
2019	Who Let the Dogs Out	Director/Producer; a documentary-comedy about tracking down the real writer of the hit song "Who Let the Dogs Out"
2019	Chris Farley: Anything for a Laugh	Director/Producer; a follow-up to 2015's "I Am Chris Farley"
2019	Ash	Executive Producer; feature film from Amazing Factory
2025	50,000 First Dates	Producer; Amazon series
